= Haitian mythology =

Folklore of the people of Haiti

Haitian mythology is the body of myths of Haiti as represented in the literature and art of the Haitians and is a form of Haitian folklore.

It consists of folktales, myths and legends from different time periods, involving sacred dance and deities, as well as the Vodou religion. Haitian Vodou is a syncretic mixture of Roman Catholic rituals and traditional African religions, and developed during the French colonial period, with roots in Dahomey, Kongo and Yoruba traditions, and folkloric influence from the indigenous Taino peoples of Haiti.

The lwa, or spirits with whom Vodou adherents work and practice, are not gods but servants of the Supreme Creator Bondye (pronounced Bon Dieu). A lot of the Iwa identities come from deities formed in the West African traditional regions, especially the Fon and Yoruba. In keeping with the French-Catholic influence of the faith, Vodou practioneers are for the most part monotheists, believing that the lwa are great and powerful forces in the world with whom humans interact and vice versa, resulting in a symbiotic relationship intended to bring both humans and the lwa back to Bondye. "Vodou is a religious practice, a faith that points toward an intimate knowledge of God, and offers its practitioners a means to come into communion with the Divine, through an ever evolving paradigm of dance, song and prayers."

== History and origins of Voodooism in Haiti ==
Vodou originated from the Animist beliefs of the Yoruba tribes in Benin.

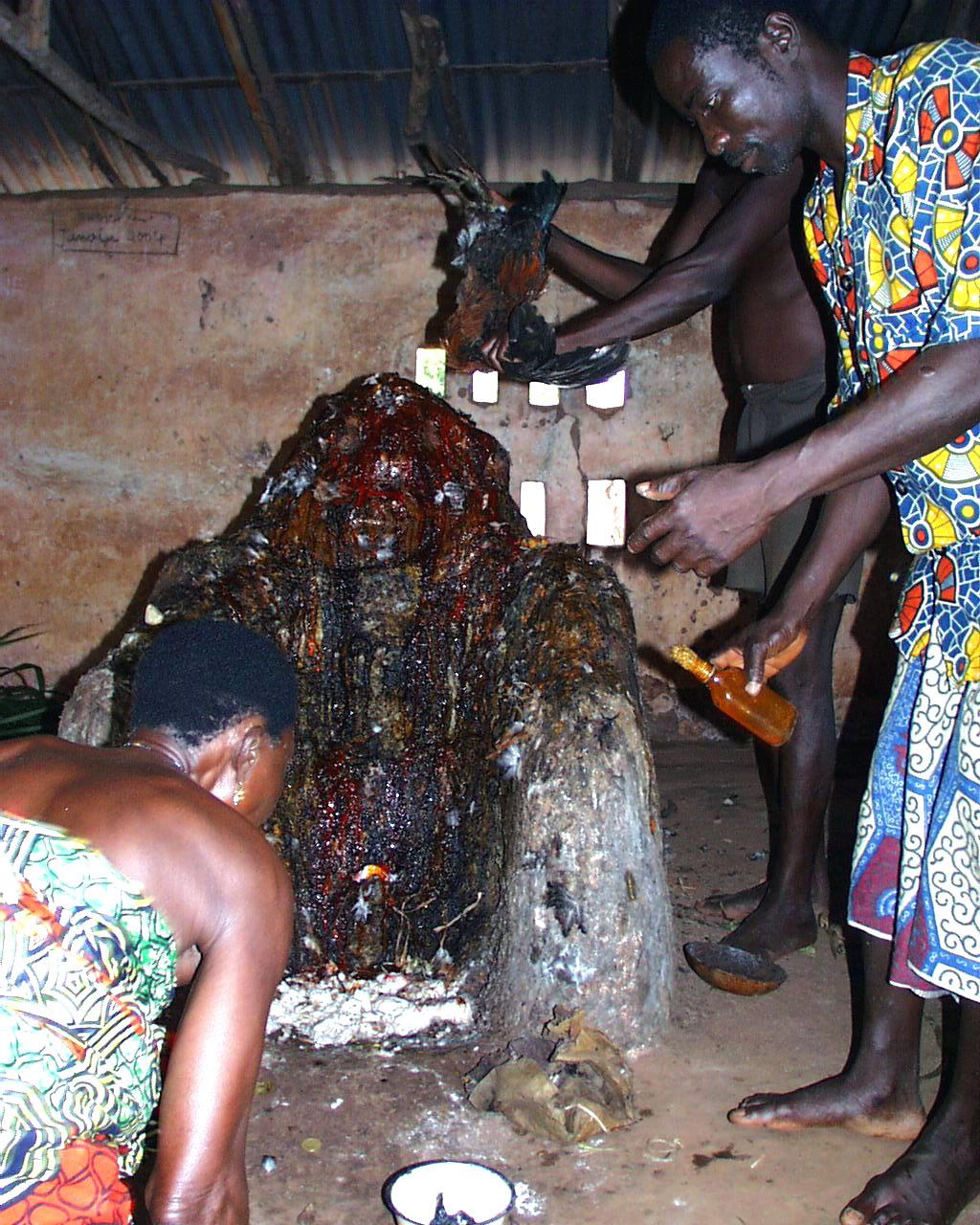
Voodoo Ritual

Voudon encapsulates an assortment of cultural elements, including personal creeds and practices, among which is a complex system of folk medical practices. Voudon to some is more than a belief but a way of life, upon which popular proverbs, stories, songs, and folklore are based around. Voudon teaches belief in a supreme being called Bondye, an unknowable and uninvolved created god. Voudon believers worship the lwa. There are in total 180 lwa in the Vodou religion, each of them carrying a name and, a specific and exclusive function. For instance, Gede are the spirit of life and death who is assigned to separate the souls and bodies of people when the time comes and also to watch over their graveyards. Gede also serve the role of connecting the past, present, and future, as well as amalgamating them into one reality.

Not only has mythology been use for politics in Haiti, but mythology has also been a vehicle for revolution. Myths like: L'Union Fait La Force (Togetherness is Strength), is a story about slaves who rose up on August 22, 1791, in a heroic battle to win their freedom, and is a story about solidarity between two different groups of people to get freedom for the collective. Mythical symbols of Voudon and the tradition of the shifting from chaos to collectivity known as the religion of Vodou play a big role in the forming of Haitian mythology. Today, individuals referred to as Alchemists of Memory are the keepers of Vodou history and Haitian mythology, preserving the stories told by their ancestors.

== Characters ==
=== People ===
- Bokor - The male equivalent of a Vodou witch. They are said to serve the lwa with "both hands" meaning they are practicing for good and evil.
- Houngan - Haitian high priest, which holds a significant social authority and historical importance of a spiritual guide to protect the community from bad influences, particularly in leading rituals for all slaves of the Haitian Revolution against French colonial rule that gave birth to the new nation of Haiti lead ceremonies, rituals, drumming, and dancing to invoke the lwa. During the Duvalier era, some of the houngans were members of the secret police (Tonton Macoutes), serving as both religious leaders and violent enforcers for the Duvalier regime led by Papa Doc Duvalier.
- Mambo - Haitian priestess who, together with the Houngan, leads the Vodou rituals and invokes the lwa.
- Ti Malice and Tonton Bouki - A pair of competing tricksters.

=== Creatures ===
- Gede - family of spirits related to death and fertility.
- Kalunderik - A giant bird with brilliant feathers, originally from Africa.
- Lougawou - A werewolf-like shapeshifter.
- Lwa - Haitian Vodou spirit.
- Tonton Macoute, a Haitian mythological phrase meaning "bogey man" (literally: "Uncle Bagman"), it is also the same name as the secret police organization during the Duvalier regime.
- Mermaid - A creature with the upper body of a woman (sometimes man) and the lower body of a fish-like creature. Mermaids are known to lure children to the ocean to take them to their homes and teach them dark magic, or drown them.
  - Tezin Nan Dlo
- Petro - aggressive and warlike family of spirits
- Rada - old, benefic family of spirits.
- Zombie - A reanimated body without a soul meant to complete or perform tasks by a Bokor.

== Lwa Vodou Spirits ==
- Adjassou-Linguetor – Haitian lwa in the form of spring water (goddess).
- Adya Houn’tò – Haitian lwa of the drums.
- Agassou – Haitian lwa which guards the Dahomean traditions.
- Ayida Wedo - Haitian lwa of fertility, rainbows, and serpents.
- Azaka-Tonnerre – Haitian god of thunder, agriculture and farmers.
- Badessy – Haitian god of the sky.
- Baron La Croix – lwa of the dead and sexuality.
- Baron Samedi – lwa of the dead, the dictator François Duvalier ("Papa Doc") aimed to appear as an immortal and supernatural figure by dressing in black suits, wearing a top hat, and donning dark glasses, similar to typical representations of Baron Samedi, which recognize the power of Vodou in Haitian culture.
- Damballa – father of the lwa and humankind.
- Diable Tonnere – Haitian god of thunder.
- Dinclinsin – Haitian vodou deity feared for his severity.
- Erzulie Dantor – Haitian vodou goddess of wealth, vengeance, and protection.
- Obatala – yoruba creator god.
- Ogoun – Haitian vodou god of fire, iron, politics, thunder and war.
- Oshun – yoruba goddess of love, also Erzulie Freda (in Vodou).
- Oya – yoruba warrior goddess.
- Papa Legba – intermediary between the lwa and humanity.

== Related notions ==
- Asagwe - Haitian Vodou dancing used to honor the lwa.
- Lakou - the central location for worship.
- Mapou tree- A sacred tree that is considered the link between the spirit world and earth. Avalou - ("supplication") Haitian Vodou dance.
- Coco macaque - Haitian Vodou implement. It is a stick, which is supposed to be able to walk on its own. The owner of a coco macaque can send it on errands. If it is used to hit an enemy, the enemy will die before the dawn.
- Gangan, Houngan - Haitian priests. They lead the peoples in dancing, drumming, and singing to invoke the lwa.
- Gede - family of spirits related to death and fertility.
- Guinee - Haitian afterlife. It is also where life began and the home of their spirits.
- Paquet congo - charms made of organic matter wrapped in cloth, intended to rouse the lwa.
- Ville au Camp - ("House in the Fields") the underwater capital of the lwa.

== See also ==
- Haitian Vodou
- Culture of Haiti
- Religion in Haiti
- Haitian art
- Veve, a religious symbol commonly used in Vodou and Palo
