= Ibo lwa =

Group of Haitian Vodou deities

The Ibo are a nanchon of lwa in Haitian Vodou. They are incorporated alusi spirits from Odinani, the indigenous religion of the eponymous Igbo people of Nigeria. The Ibo are largely characterized as proud warrior spirits that were invoked during the Haitian Revolution.

== Origin ==
The Igbo people were sold into the Atlantic slave trade by the Kingdom of Dahomey. Those slaves sold to the French colony of Saint-Domingue brought their indigenous religion of Odinani, which was incorporated as lwa into the nascent Haitian Vodou hybrid religion. The Igbo were a minority among Afro-Haitians in Saint-Domingue, based on the Tiburon Peninsula, but were stereotyped across the Atlantic plantations for particular opposition to the slave trade among Africans, typified as the most willing to commit suicide.

== Pantheon ==
- Ibo Lele

=== Absorption into other nanchons ===
The Ibo lwa have long been associated with the Rada lwa, historically grouped as the 'Guinea rites' with the Nago lwa. As the Rada became a dominant rite in modern Haitian Vodou, it has largely absorbed the Ibo lwa, making it less of a distinct nanchon. The Petwo lwa nanchon has also integrated Ibo lwa, in addition to the Kongo lwa it was largely merged with.

== Worship ==
Theologian Leslie Desmangles in 1992 described Ibo as one of the most well-known, if regional nanchons of contemporary Haitian Vodou. The veve of Haitian Vodou are descended in part from the nsibidi pictograms of the Igbo.

Ibo dance rhythms require three drummers. The Ibo dance is a two-step left to right. In Ibo songs, the Igbo language word lele ('singing') features heavily.

The Ibo are invoked for the 'Ibo bath', a ritual purification that confers good luck. According to Milo Riguad, the ingredients of the bath are "a litre of blazing alcohol: a banana, sea water collected 'at the islands;' mushrooms; crushed pineapple; seven holly leaves; a bottle of holy water taken from a holy water basin in a church; and perfume." The bath is repeated over the course of a week with the same concoction, typically using it up.
