= Nago lwa =

Haitian Vodou spirit nation

The Nago are a nanchon of lwa in Haitian Vodou. The Nago are religious syncretization of the orisha and rites of Yoruba religion into Haitian Vodou, stemming from the Nagos brought to Haiti in the Atlantic slave trade. The Nago are militant, masculine spirits that are worshiped through muscularly-choreographed song and dance. The nation has been increasingly amalgamated into the rites of the dominant strains of Haitian Vodou, the Rada lwa and the Petwo lwa, while still maintaining a distinct ancestral identity.

== Etymology and origin ==
The term Nago comes from slavery in Haiti, where slave ships called the Yoruba 'Nagos', from Anagó, a historic exonym. Enslaved Yoruba syncretized rites and the orisha spirits from Yoruba religion into the nascent Haitian Vodou tradition, and the lwa inherited their national appellation. Similar creolization of Yoruba religion occurred in other African diaspora religions: in Brazil as Candomblé Ketu, and in Cuba as Santería with the Lucumí liturgical language.

== Characteristics ==
The lwa of the Nago nanchon are typically masculine, powerful and demanding figures. Kyrah Malika Daniels writes that Nago is associated with the elements of earth and fire, as opposed to Rada lwa of air and water; Milo Rigaud writes that Nago is associated with the element of metal.

== Pantheon ==
Veve for Ogou

The leader of the Nago nanchon is the lwa Loco, called the "king of the Nago" (wa Nago). The dominant group of lwa in the Nago nanchon are the Ogou, the syncretization of the orisha Ògún; the majority of Ogou lwa are Nago. The Ogou are paternal spirits, with different aspects appearing as warriors, statesmen and bokor. Some Nago Ogou are syntheses of another orisha with Ogun: Ogou Batala is Ogun mixed with Obatala; Ogou Osanj is with Ọsanyìn; Ogou Yansan is with Ọya (Ìyásán); and Ogou Chango is with Shango. Orisha other than Ogun syncretized as Nago lwa are usually recognized as warrior spirits, even if their Yoruban religion counterpart is not.

=== Assimilation ===
The Nago nanchon has increasingly been absorbed into the larger Rada lwa and Petwo lwa respectively, considered a subgroup of the respective rites as opposed to a fully separate nation. The lwa maintain the same militant nature, even as it contrasts with the 'cool' nature of the Rada lwa. Nago lwa incoporated into other rites may gain epithets, such as 'Ogou Zyeux Rouge' in Petwo (Ogou Red-Eyed).

Veneration of the Nago as a wholly distinct nation is more typical of Northern Haitian Vodou.

== Worship ==
"Awo che Nago" (Note: also "ochè Nago", "awo ache Nago") (transl. "by the power of the Nago lwa") is a ritual call in Vodou ceremonies, marking the beginning and end of Nago rituals. The Haut Chant Nago is a welcoming song for the Nago lwa.

For Haitian Vodou drumming in the Nago rite, three Rada cowhide-head drums are needed. Nago beats include the Nago Chaud (Hot Nago), a fast paced beat; and the Nago Grand Coup, a slow, heavy beat. The Nago dance to these beats features strong thrusting, swaying, shoulder undulations, and pirouettes combined with fast footwork.

For the zin, a ceremonial cooking pot part of some Vodou rituals, Nago rites necessitate an iron zin instead of the typical clay vessel.

== See also ==
- Boum'ba Maza – Haitian vodou lwa family
