= Erzulie =

Family of Voodoo spirits

Erzulie Freda
- Love, health, beauty, passion, prosperity, perfumes, jewelry, flowers
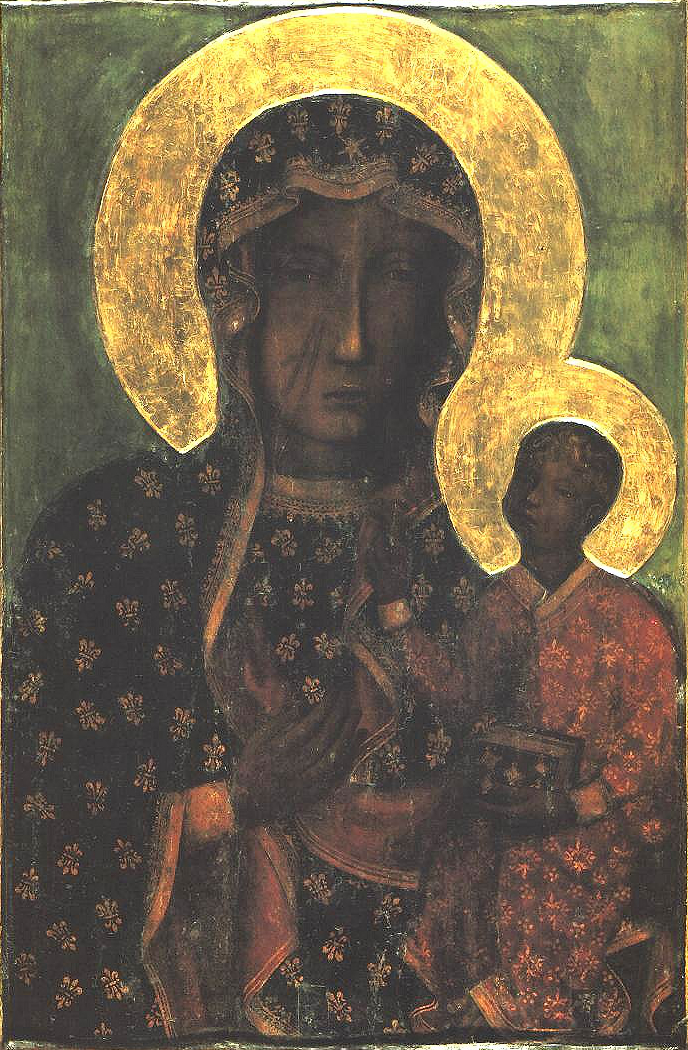
- The Black Madonna of Częstochowa, the inspiration typically used in the depiction of Erzulie Dantor
- Venerated in: Haitian Vodou, Louisiana Voodoo, Folk Catholicism
- Attributes: Pale bejeweled woman, pink dresses, three wedding rings, heart-shaped medals, heart pierced by sword

Erzulie (sometimes spelled Erzili or Èzili) is a family of loa, or spirits, in Vodou.

== Overview ==
The Erzulie is a family of loa that are often associated with water (fluidity), femininity, and feminine bodies. They are one of the only group of spirits directly tied to these characteristics and those who become possessed (through spirit possession) often are women or Masisi (effeminate and or homosexual men).

== Maîtresse Mambo Erzulie Fréda Dahomey ==
Erzulie Fréda Dahomey, the Rada aspect of Erzulie, is the Haitian African spirit of love, beauty, jewelry, dancing, luxury, and flowers. She wears three wedding rings, one for each husband - Damballa, Agwe and Ogoun. Her symbol is a heart, her colors are pink, blue, white and gold, and her favorite offerings include jewelry, perfume, sweet cakes and liqueurs. Coquettish and very fond of beauty and finery, Erzulie Freda is femininity and compassion embodied, yet she also has a darker side; she is seen as jealous and spoiled and within some Vodoun circles is considered to be lazy. During ritual possession, she may enter the body of either a man or a woman. She enjoys the game of flirtation and seduces people without distinguishing between sexes. In Christian iconography she is often identified with the Mater Dolorosa, as well as another loa named Metres Ezili. She is conceived of as never able to attain her heart's most fervent desire. For this reason she always leaves a service in tears. Common syncretizations include Iyalorde Oxum, that is the goddess Oshun as she relates to the Yoruba goddess of erotic love, gold and femininity.

== Èrzulie Dantòr ==
Erzulie Dantòr is a lwa of the Petro nation and is described as the mother of Ti Jean Petro. She is often depicted as a Black woman holding a child, a representation associated with protection. In Vodou belief, she is regarded as a protector of women, children, and marginalized individuals. She is also associated with lwa pwen, in contrast to Erzulie Freda, who is linked to material prosperity, while Erzulie Dantòr is associated with spiritual knowledge and guidance.

She is often portrayed to resemble the Black Madonna of Częstochowa, as she is represented as being dark-skinned with two scars on her face. Her colors are red, black and blue. Her favourite offerings include black pigs, griot (seasoned fried pork), blood (seven stabs of the sword), and rum.

Ti Jean Petro is her son and Jean Petro is her lover or husband.

== Erzulie Family ==
=== Rada ===
- Erzulie Freda (Lady Erzulie) – the vain and flirty goddess of love. Her "horses" tend to cry tears of longing and regret. She is syncretized with Our Lady of Sorrows (the Virgin Mary as suffering mother).
- Erzulie Mansur (Erzulie the Blessed) – represents maternal love and protects children from harm.
- Granne Erzulie (Grandma Erzulie) – represents the wisdom granted by experience and maturity and grandmotherly kindness and love. She is syncretized with St. Anne, the mother of the Virgin Mary.

=== Petro ===
- Erzulie D'en Tort or Erzulie Dantor (Erzulie of the Wrongs) – protects women and children and deals revenge against those who wrong them.
- Erzulie Balianne (Erzulie the Gagged) – "silences" (heals or calms) hearts. Keeps secrets or ensures that secrets will not be revealed. Helps people to forget past loves and overcome passionate emotions. Her "horses" tend to speak as if they have a gag in their mouth. She is syncretized with The Immaculate Heart.
- Erzulie Mapiangue (Erzulie the Suckler) – deals with the pain of childbirth and the protection of unborn and newborn babies. Her "horses" tend to get in a fetal position or birthing position and cry tears of pain. Common syncretization is as the Virgin and Infant of Prague, who wear matching red velvet robes and gold crowns.
- Erzulie Yeux Rouge or Erzulie Ge-Rouge (Red-Eyed Erzulie) – takes revenge on unfaithful lovers. Her "horses" cry tears of bitter sadness.
- Erzulie Toho – aids the jealous or slighted in love. Her "horses" cry tears of anger.

=== Others ===
- Erzulie La Flambeau (Erzulie of the Torch)
- Erzulie Wangol (Erzulie of the Sacred Banner)
- Erzulie Shango Pye Nago loa that is a feminine aspect of Shango.

== Similar spirits in the pantheon ==
- La Sirène (Lasirenn) or Mami Wata is associated with Erzulie and sometimes is displayed in Erzulie's roles as mother, lover, and protector. She is often depicted as half-fish, half-human and has a strong connection to water. Her husband is Agwe, the King of the Sea and patron of sailors and fishermen.
- Marinette Bras-Chêche or Marinette Bwa Chech ("Marinette of the Dry Arms/ Marinette skinny arms "), a Kongo Loa, is similar to Erzulie Dantor. She represents revolt and misfortune and is prayed to either to placate her wrath or to direct her fury at another. She is in the form of a skeleton or rotting corpse and is syncretically represented by the Anima Sola ("Forsaken Soul").
- Mai-Louise is an Ibo goddess.
- Ti-Quitta / Ti Kitha, a Loa of sexuality and fertility, is one of the Quitta Loas. One of her aspects is Ti Quitta Demembre (Dismembered Quitta).
- Maman Brigitte ("Mother Brigitte"), a Guede goddess who is the wife of Baron Samedi and protector of gravestones or funerary markers. She is syncretically represented by St Brigit.
- Tsillah Wedo is associated with Erzulie. She is depicted as a beautiful virgin of great wealth.

== Erzulie in popular culture ==
Music

- "Erzulie nennen O", a song in honor of Erzulie Freda that was composed in the 1890s by Kandjo, continues to be played in Haiti as part of its folkloric repertoire.
- A 1991 song on the album Rising Above Bedlam by Jah Wobble's Invaders of the Heart. Released by Oval Records in 1991, the album was a shortlisted nominee for the 1992 Mercury Prize.
- A 1988 solo album by free-jazz pianist Cecil Taylor is called Erzulie Maketh Scent.
- "Mistress of Erzulie" was the first track on Alannah Myles' 1995 album A-lan-nah.
- Erzulie (Freda) is also a character in the Broadway musical Once On This Island as the beautiful goddess of love.
- In the Steely Dan song "Two Against Nature" (the third track from the album of the same name), the narrator describes Madame Erzulie as a succubus who "bangs you silly but leaves a nasty bite."
- In the Natacha Atlas song "Le Printemps" from the album Something Dangerous, Erzulie sets the beginning of spring.
- "Erzili" is a song on the album by Beverly Glenn-Copeland, Transmissions: The Music of Beverly Glenn-Copeland.
- "Ezili" - (from the album "Potomitan") is a song written by Sélène Saint-Aimé a French-Caribbean contrabass player, vocalist and poet.
- "Erzulie - Interlude" - (from the album Tristesse Business Saison 01) is a song by the French singer and rapper Luidji. He also refers to Erzulie in the song "Le Rouge" from the EP Boscolo Exedra. He says, "Je vais faire de toi ma nouvelle Erzulie," which translates to "I'm going to make you my new Erzulie".
- Don_Cerati released the single "Dantor" dedicated to Ezili in 2023.

Literature

- Ezilis Mirrors: Imagining Black Queer Genders is a book by Omise'eke Natasha Tinsley that covers the contemporary works of queer and non-traditional artists and how they embody Erzulie in their work.
- A powerful swamp witch/voodoo woman in Terry Pratchett's 1991 Discworld novel Witches Abroad is named Erzulie Gogol. She is the lover of Genua's former ruler, Baron Saturday (Baron Samedi).
- In the Buffy the Vampire Slayer comic Past Lives, part 4, Erzulie is invoked to clear a room of all magic.
- Erzulie, Papa Legba and Baron Samedi all appear in the WildCats original comic series, assisting Voodoo.
- In the Dark Shadows novel, Angelique's Descent, Angelique Bouchard was forced to pose as Erzulie in a series of religious rituals as a child in order to appease her father's slaves.
- There is discussion of a portrait of Maitresse Erzulie in Zadie Smith's 2005 novel On Beauty.
- Erzulie is a love goddess in House of Whispers in The Sandman Universe comics series.
- Erzulie is one of six characters of Michèle Césaire's La Nef. She is described as "l'amoureuse-type" by the author in her preface "Les passagers de la nef".

In "Breath, Eyes, Memory" by Edwidge Danticat, Erzulie is mentioned throughout the novel as a Haitian "goddess of love who doubled for us [Haitians] as the Virgin Mother" (113, Second Vintage Contemporaries Edition, 1998).

Television

- In The Spectacular Spider-Man animated series, "Ezili" is the surname of the villain Calypso, a voodoo practitioner who had no last name in the original comics.
- In the British TV series Death in Paradise, the island of Saint Marie has an annual festival dedicated to Erzuile. The festival is first celebrated in the premiere of the second season, and is shown again in the third episode of season seven.

Broadway

- In the Broadway show Once On This Island, Erzulie is one of the four main gods that guide and influence the main character. Once On This Island came to Broadway from 1990 to 1991 and had a revival from November 2017 until January 2019.

Video games

- Cyberpunk 2077 contains a poster of "St Erzulie" during a mission with Briggit among the Voodoo Boys.
- Shin Megami Tensei: Devil Summoner includes Erzulie as a regular Megami-Race demon.
- Bloons TD 6 contains the hero monkey named Ezili.
