= Filomez =

Filomez is a loa that belongs to the Rada nation. She is a water spirit that is served with pastel colors such as blue, pink, and sometimes even green. In some Vodou houses, she is the younger sister of Erzulie Freda. In others, she is not. Filomez is considered to be a very rare, yet potent, loa.
