= Captain Debas =

In the religion of Haitian Vodou, Captain Debas (also Debard, Deebat) is a loa of the guede.

Captain Debas is part of the rada nation, not guede, and should be served in rada rites rather than guede rites. He is a family loa and can be combined with any other loa of any nation who allows families. Originates from Africa and is originally from Vodoun.
