= Boum'ba Maza =

Haitian vodou lwa family

The Maza (Note: also Masa) (Kongo for 'water', further "Terrestrial Master of Water") or Boum'ba (Note: also Bumba, Mbumba) (Haitian Creole for 'boat') are a family of lwa spirits in the Makaya and Petwo rites of Haitian Vodou, led by Boum'ba Maza. Derived from the bisimbi water spirits of Kongolese religion, the Maza were syncretized into Vodou in the 18th century Afro-Haitian veneration of nkisi spirit fetishes.

According to Milo Rigaud, Boum'ba are a subset of the Maza family, where the former is prefixed to those lwa that are particular "masters" of the ritual libation; he identifies Boum'ba Maza as a group of lwa instead of singular. Conversely, Richard Ward identifies Boum'ba as the family and Maza as the sub-group, with Boum'ba Maza in the singular as its head.

== Mythology and worship ==
The Maza lord over the magic of libation, which is used to invoke the crucial vèvè in the hounfour ritual space. They are the spiritual embodiment of sacred waters, like the water basin of the houngan, and in Christian syncreticism, the biblical wells of Midian and Bethlehem.

The Maza first developed primarily in the Makaya rite, before being incorporated into the larger Petwo rite.The Maza differ from the majority of the Petwo lwa in two ways: firstly, they are characterized with water, while Petwo lwa are typically characterized by "hotness" and fire; and they are syncretized from Kongolese religion, instead of West African religion like most Petwo lwa. Symbols of the Maza are "magic baths", like wells of sacred water and fire; the latter is particularly prevalent on Christmas Eve services.

The Maza are invoked for their connection to agricultural bounty and fertility, and in turn their preferred offerings are the first of the harvest. Boumba Maza in particular is a benevolent psychopomp; the maza and Boumba Maza are comparable to the Rada rite Azaka Medeh and Gede rite Papa Gede.

The vèvè of the Maza, particularly Boumba Maza and Kita Maza, include arrows, a feature unique to Kongolese-derived Petwo vèvè.

== Historiography and provenance ==
In the 1780s, Saint-Domingue Creole lawyer Médéric Louis Élie Moreau de Saint-Méry transcribed a chant he heard in Saint-Domingue in his 1789 work Description de Saint-Domingue. Moreau identified the chant as one of a snake cult from the Fon people of Dahomey. In 1946, Catholic bishop and historian Jean Cuvelier identified the chant as being Kikongo language, re-transliterated the chant, and translated it into English.

Moreau's transcription

Eh! Eh! Bomba, hen! Hen! /
Canga bafio té /
Canga mouen dé lé /
Canga do ki la /
Canga li.

Cuvelier's transliteration

Ee Ee Mbumba! /
Kanga Bafioti /
Kanga Mundele /
Kanga Ndoki /
Kanga

English translation

Oh! Mbumba snake /
Stop the blacks /
Stop the white man /
Stop the ndoki (witch) /
Stop them

Cuvelier then identified mbumba instead as specifically Mbumba Luangu, a rainbow serpent venerated in fertility rituals of the Vili people of the Lower Congo. There are various alternative theories to the provenance of the Kongolose term mbumba in the chant. Mbumba is also a chief deity in Yombe people mythology, who lords over initiation rites; Moreau's initial transcription may have reflected the Kiyombe language tendency to drop double-consonant pairings at the beginning of words. Historian Wyatt MacGaffey in 2016 wrote that Cuvelier's identification, and other theories based on morphology, are erroneous: due to Moreau's disregard in using phonetic notation, mbumba could be confused for a variety of terms. Art historian Robert Farris Thompson identifies mbumba as 'calabash', which a nkisi would be made from.

Aimé Césaire embellished his 1960 biography of Haitian revolutionary Toussaint Louverture with the Moreau chant, presenting it as having been chanted in 1791 during the Haitian Revolution.

== List of lwa ==
- Boum'ba Maza
- Bossou Komblamin
- Bossou Twa Kòn
- Cimetière Boum'ba
- Criminel Maza
- Escalia Boum'ba
- Jonquille Maza
- Kalfu Louvim'bha
- Kalfu Maza
- Kita Maza
- Louvingou Maza
- Mahi Lwiz Boumba
- Marinette Boumba
- Petwo Maza
- Pin'ga Maza
- Prin'ga Maza
- Simityè Boumba
- Twa Z'ilets Maza
- Twa Kitha Maza
- Zazi Maza
