= Mademoiselle Charlotte =

Loa in Haitian vodou

Mademoiselle Charlotte is a loa who manifests with the commonly perceived personality traits of a white woman in Haitian Vodou. Appearances in Voodoo ceremonies are rare, possibly as a result of her non-African origin. According to tradition, both Mademoiselle Charlotte and Dinclinsin came to Haiti with the colonists and only began appearing in ceremonies at that time.

Mademoiselle Charlotte prefers the strict observance of all the niceties of ritual protocol. She generally speaks French and will grant the ability to speak that language to a "horse" with no knowledge of it during the time in which she manifests. Mademoiselle Charlotte is served in a manner similar to that of Erzulie. She enjoys sweet rose-, blue-, white-, or cream-colored beverages, water sweetened with syrup, any type of non-alcoholic liqueurs, clairin, and acassan (a drink consisting of boiled cornmeal sweetened with highly refined cane juice). She prefers the tender meat of young chickens as her ritual food offering. Her color is rose. Her services are difficult to obtain as she only works for people to whom she takes a fancy.
