= Maman Brigitte =

Death loa in Haitian vodou

- Lwa of life, death, cemeteries, healing, and justice/purification
- Member of Guede
- Veve for Maman Brigitte
- Other names: Grandma Brigitte, Manman, Maman Brijit, Grann (or Gran) Brigitte, Brigitte, Manman Brijit
- Abode: Voodoo underworld
- Mantra: Banda
- Animals: Black rooster, horse & dove
- Symbol: White Rum/White Wine with 3 drop of salt , fire, gravestones, crosses
- Tree: Elm, weeping willow & menthe
- Color: White, gray & purple
- Gender: Female
- Consort: Baron Lakwa/Samedi
- Offspring: Guede Nibo (adopted)

Equivalents
- Christian: Brigid of Kildare; Mary Magdalene
- Yoruba: Oya
- Fons: Ayiza/Ayizan

Maman Brigitte (English: Mother Brigitte) sometimes also written as Manman Brigitte and also known by Gran Brigitte, Grann Brigitte, Manman, Manman Brigit, and Maman Brijit is a death loa (or lwa) and the consort of Baron Samedi in Haitian Vodou. She drinks white rum or white wine & coffee with no sugar and is symbolized by a black rooster. Maman Brigitte protects graves in Haitian cemeteries that are marked by the cross of Baron Samedi. Graves that are protected by Brigitte are marked by a mound of stones. In Vodou practice, the first burials serve as offerings to either Baron Samedi or Maman Brigitte depending on the sex of the person being buried: if male, the grave is dedicated to Baron Samedi; if female to Maman Brigitte.

Like Samedi and the Guede, she is foul-mouthed. She is also the adoptive mother of Guede Nibo.

Maman Brigitte also has the distinction of being one of the few loa who is depicted as being White. Due to the religious persecution of enslaved African and Caribbean people in Haiti and the Americas, Maman Brigitte was disguised via syncretism and represented by various saints, usually those depicted with fire or snakes, including Brigid of Kildare and, less frequently, Mary Magdalene.

== In popular culture ==
=== Literature ===
- In the 1988 cyberpunk novel Mona Lisa Overdrive, one of the AIs inhabiting cyberspace puts on the persona of Maman Brigitte to communicate with human characters.

=== Video games ===
- In the game Cyberpunk 2077, there is a character named Maman Brigitte who comes from Haiti that leads the gang the Voodoo Boys.
- Maman Brigitte appears as a playable character in the 2014 multiplayer online battle arena Smite, alongside her husband Baron Samedi. She is the second playable Voodoo Lwa.
- In the game The Seance at Blake Manor, a character named Lloyd Dupré, who is an undertaker in New Orleans, is an ougan devoted to Maman Brigitte.

=== Art ===
- Haitian artists such as Andre Pierre and Gerard Paul painted representations of Brigitte in their artwork, which was informed by Haitian Vodou.

=== Television ===
- In season 2, episode 5 of the television series American Gods, Maman Brigitte is portrayed by Hani Furstenberg as the lover of Baron Samedi (portrayed by Mustafa Shakir).

== See also ==
- Mademoiselle Charlotte, another White loa, depicted as an upper-class French woman
- Dinclinsin, another White loa, depicted as a cruel slave owner
- Ọya
