= Marassa Jumeaux =

Loa of divinity in Vodou

- Loa of Divinity, Divine power, justice, truth, reason, mystery, Divine Twins
- Venerated in: Haitian Vodou, Folk Catholicism

Marassa Jumeaux are the divine twins in Vodou. They are children, but more ancient than any other loa. "Love, truth and justice. Directed by reason. Mysteries of liaison between earth and heaven and they personify astronomic-astrological learning. They synthesize the vodou Loa as personification of divine power and the human impotence. Double life, they have considerable power which allow them manage people through the stomach. They are children mysteries."

The Marassa are somewhat different from standard Loa, both on a level above them, and counted in their number, they are both twins, and yet they number three, they are male and female, and both male and both female - an example of the Haitian worldview's capacity to retain two seemingly contradictory concepts. In some houses they are not channelled through possession in Vodou ritual, but served first after Legba.

The Marassa are commonly syncretised with the Catholic Saints Cosmas and Damian.

== References in popular culture ==
=== Books ===
Edwidge Danticat explores philosophical themes associated with Marassa in her novel The Dew Breaker.

=== Music ===
Paul Beaubrun released a song dedicated to the Lwa, titled "Marasa Elou" on his album Ayibobo.
