= Baron Cimetière =

Spirit of the dead in Haitian Vodou

- Lwa and Guardian of the Cemetery, protection from grave desecration
- Venerated in: Haitian Vodou, Louisiana Voodoo, Folk Catholicism
- Attributes: Black tailcoat and top hat, cigar, bottle of wine

Baron Cimetière is one of the Gede, a spirit of the dead, along with Baron Samedi and Baron La Croix in Vodou. He is said to be the guardian of the cemetery, protecting its graves.

He wears a tuxedo with tails and a top hat. He has expensive taste, smoking cigars and drinking wine and fine liquor. He is just as crass as the other Gede but shows polite manners and an upper-class air while doing so.

== Other manifestations ==
Brave Gede is the doorman between the world of the living and the afterlife, guardian of the cemetery gate. He keeps the dead in and the living out.
