= Baron Criminel =

Haitian Vodou mythological figure

- Death, cemeteries, criminals
- Venerated in: Haitian Vodou, Louisiana Voodoo, Folk Catholicism
- Attributes: Black tailcoat and top hat, cigar, bottle of wine
- Day: November 3

Baron Criminel (also spelled Baron Kriminel) is a powerful spirit or loa in the Haitian Vodou religion. He is envisioned as the first murderer who has been condemned to death, and is invoked to pronounce swift judgment. Baron Criminel is syncretized with Saint Martin de Porres, perhaps because his feast day is November 3, the day after Fête Guede or Fête Ghede (Haitian Creole: Fèt Gede). His colors are black, purple, white and deep blood red.

== Worship ==
A person possessed by Baron Criminel shouts obscenities, spits libations to all past criminals and threatens to kill surrounding people who violate them. If, during possession, Baron Criminel is presented with food he does not like, he will threaten to bite chunks out of the arms of the possessed person. He sometimes calls for sacrifices of black chickens to be doused in petrol and set alight. The shrieking of the chickens when being burned alive is said to appeal to the cruel nature of Baron Criminel and appease him. Baron Criminel is said to be one of Baron Samedi's many aspects.

Baron Criminel will often grant requests in lieu. He is said to return on Fete Ghede, the Voduns' "Festival of the Dead" (November 2), to claim payment.
