= Adya =

Adya is a given name for both boys and girls in India. In Russian, it is a diminutive of the male first names Avdey and Avdiky.

Notable people with the name include:

- Adya Prasad Pandey, Indian economist, former Vice Chancellor of Manipur University
- Adya Rangacharya (1904–1984), Indian writer, actor, and scholar
- Adya van Rees-Dutilh (1876–1959), Dutch artist
- Adya van Rees-Dutilh (1929–2015), Indian dramatist and playwright
- Zaskia Adya Mecca (born 1987), Indonesian actress

== See also ==
- Adya Houn'tò, a spirit associated with drumming in West African Vodun
- Adyashanti, an American spiritual teacher
- Aadya Bedi, Indian actress
