= Saint Anne in Haitian Vodou =

Syncretization of Christian saint

In Haitian Vodou, Saint Anne, mother of Mary, mother of Jesus, is syncretized with multiple lwa: Aloumandia, Délai and Ti Saint Anne. Aloumandia and Ti Saint Anne are largely worshipped in the department of Artibonite, in north-central Haiti.

== Aloumandia ==
Aloumandia or Aloumandja—also Maman Aloumandia, Grann Aloumandia, or Grande Aloumandia—is a lwa mainly worshiped in the department of Artibonite. She is variously identified as part of the Kongo lwa, Rada lwa or Ogou lwa; to the latter, she is a rare grandmotherly figure in the typically masculine, warlike Ogou nation. She is a river spirit of the Artibonite River, along with the personification of the river itself. According to writer Déita, Aloumandia is also known as Hazagou Limba or Azaka Limba.

Aloumandia is attributed as the foremost of the many patron lwa to Haitian Emperor Jean-Jacques Dessalines as his met tet—his guiding spirit. As a symbol of his faith to Aloumandia during the Haitian Revolution, he wore a yellow headscarf (mouchwa), adorned with brown and black. Dessalines was most often possessed by Aloumandia when attending hounfour temple services in Arcahaie. According to a contemporary Vodou song, Dessalines was warned by Aloumandia of an impending attempt on his life should he go to Port-au-Prince; he ignored the premonition, and was later assassinated.

Her feast day on May 18 coincides with Haitian Flag Day, wherein she is also called Saint Soleil Haiti or Grand Saint Anne as syncretized with Saint Anne. Aloumandia is the godmother to Limba. Ibo Lele is her sister.

== Délai ==
External image
- Maîtresse Délai by André Pierre, oil painting

Délai—also called Maîtresse Délai or Grande Délai—is the patron of the tambourine. (Note: In Haitian music, tambourine may refer to the ground bow (tambour maringouin, lit. 'mosquito drum') or a miniature version of the tymbale double-headed drum.) Délai's aspect Délai Medeh (Note: Also Dèla-i-e Médeh.) is invoked in hounfour temple ceremonies for Haitian Vodou drumming, as patron of the tambour and dominator of the drummers, along with Papa Houn'thor.

== Ti Saint Anne ==
Saint Anne also came to be syncretized as Ti Saint Anne or Ti Sentàn, based around Anse-à-Foleur. Popular legend states that in the early 20th century, a doll was found in a river by Catholic pilgrims traveling to Higüey. The doll was discarded but began to invoke miracles, such as returning from being thrown down a well, and private revelation from Saint Anne. Ti Saint Anne's syncretized feast day is held on July 26, observed across Artibonite. Pilgrims to Anse-à-Foleur, predominantly women, travel for blessings of good fortune; the doll has had a viewing fee for much of its history, reaching 10 Haitian gourde in 2007 (US$0.54).
