= Congo (loa) =

Vodou spirit

Congo is a handsome but apathetic loa in Vodou. In the Congo Savanne aspect, he is a fierce petro loa. He is a powerful man-eating loa whose patron color is white.
