= Maîtresse Hounon'gon =

Vodou spirit

Maîtresse Hounon'gon is the loa who presides over the chanting done during an ordeal by fire, called a canzo in Vodou.
