= Sousson-Pannan =

Sousson-Pannan is a hideously ugly loa, covered in sores, who is known for drinking copious amounts of both liquor and blood in Vodou.
