= Guédé-Linto =

Spirit in the Haitian Vodou religion

Guédé-Linto (Haitian Creole: Gede Linto) also spelled as Guédé Linto, Guede Linto, Ghede Linto, is a Vodou loa that performs miracles.

According to legend, Linto looks like a five foot tall dark-skinned old man with glasses, a cane, and an old-fashioned black hat. He is very well mannered and docile. Some followers think he is a small boy because of his kindness.

In the legends, this spirit loves to teach his devotees to dance and enjoys making them gifts made with rum, eau de cologne, cigarettes, and fire. Sometimes he cuts a strand of yarn for each of his followers or for the children in his home, turning these threads into needles to be used. On other occasions, he offers gold rings and chains as gifts. He loves knots and makes gifts of scarves. Linto makes these kinds of gifts to make sure his children are in good hands. His work is highly competent, direct, and precise.

Linto can identify problems half a year in advance and help his faithful prepare to face them or the way to prevent them.
