= Mombu =

Voodoo spirit

Mombu is a loa who stutters and causes heavy rains in Voodoo.

== Appearance ==
Mombu is known to wear a red and white kerchief, and her favorite colors include red and black. She can be found in springs, her favorite food is goat meat, and her favorite drinks are rum and wine.

== Legend ==
Mombu is featured in a story about the consequences of annoying a loa. In the story a female servant of Mombu names her daughter Mombu Sapotille after the loa. Mombu was unhappy with this and ordered the woman to change the child's name, but she refused. When the daughter was seven years old, she went to get water one day and never returned. The father was a houngan, and he consulted his candle on whether the girl could be returned by performing a ceremony to appease Mombu. He learned that the child would be held prisoner under the water for seven years. Seven years later, after the father died, the mother looked outside to see a strange young woman. The woman seemed to be mute, but after a glass of water and a short time, the woman revealed herself to be the daughter.
