= L'inglesou =

Vodou spirit of Haiti

L'inglesou is a Vodou loa (spirit) who supposedly lives in the wild areas of Haiti and kills anyone who offends him.

== Portrayal ==
He executes judgment on those who cannot keep their word, including any oungan or mambo who cannot keep the secrets of voodoo from the uninitiated. L'inglesou is feared and respected by all. He almost never comes in possession, but when he does, he must be served correctly, or the houngan or mambo will be cruelly punished.

When L'inglesou comes in possession, he eats only glasses and razor blades and drinks warm bull's blood. His color is red. He is syncretized with the Sacred Heart of Jesus. He likes sharp objects such as knives, scissors, barbed wire, razor blades and, in general, anything that will rip or tear flesh.
