= Clermeil =

Haitian Vodou god

In Haitian Vodou, Clermeil is a lwa who makes rivers flood their banks. He is usually depicted as a white male. Clermeil is believed to be the father of all light-colored children. He is sometimes considered among the most powerful of lwa.

According to legend, Clermeil was a cruel French colonial. When his slaves tried to kill him he prayed to the devil, and promised his soul if the devil would save him. One story tells of how he abducted a woman and carried her away to his home underwater.
