= Sobo (deity) =

Thunder loa

Sobo is a spirit or loa in Haitian Vodou. He is the loa of thunder and is always depicted and served with his inseparable companion/brother Bade, who is the loa of wind. Together they are represented by the Catholic image of Saints Cosmas and Damian. He is probably West African in origin and a flaming ram is his symbol.
