= Azaka-Tonnerre =

Azaka-Tonnerre (also Azaca or Azacca) is a loa of thunder in Haitian Vodou. He is in the same "family" as Azaka Medeh, the loa of harvest.
