= Adjassou-Linguetor =

Loa in Haitian Vodou folklore

Adjassou-Linguetor is a loa with protruding eyes and a bad temper in Haitian Vodou. She governs spring water.
