= Damballa =

Creator and snake loa

- bodies of water
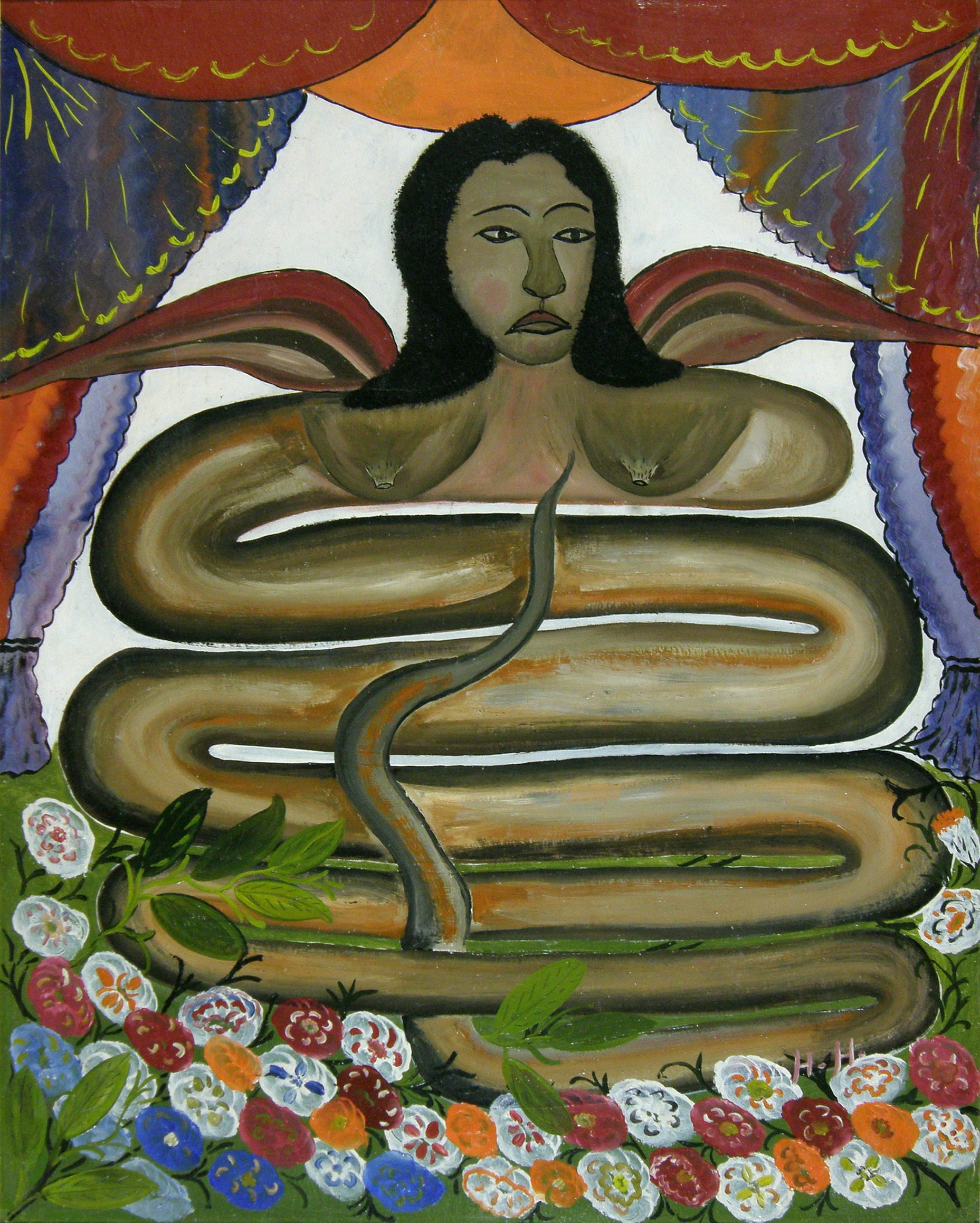
- Damballah La Flambeau, by the Haitian artist Hector Hyppolite
- Venerated in: Haitian Vodou, Folk Catholicism

Damballa, also spelled Damballah, Dambala, Dambalah, among other variations (Haitian Creole: Danbala), is one of the most important of all loa, spirits in West African Vodun, Haitian Voodoo and other African diaspora religious traditions such as Obeah. He is traditionally portrayed as a great white or black serpent, but may also be depicted as a rainbow. Damballa originated in the city of Wedo (Whydah or Ouidah) in modern-day Benin.

== Mythology ==
Damballa is said to be the sky father and the primordial creator of all life, or the first thing created by the Bondye. In those Vodou societies that view Damballa as the primordial creator, he created the cosmos by using his 7000 coils to form the stars and the planets in the heavens and to shape the hills and valleys on Earth. In others, being the first thing created by God, creation was undertaken through him. By shedding the serpent skin, Damballa created all the waters on the Earth. As a serpent, he moves between land and water, generating life, and through the earth, uniting the land with the waters below. Damballa is usually syncretized with either Saint Patrick or Moses. He is counted among the Rada loa.

Damballa is seen as benevolent and patient, wise and kind, yet detached and removed from the trials and tribulations of daily human life. His presence brings peace and represents a continuum, "at once the ancient past and the assurance of the future." As a serpent, and due to his extreme wisdom, he does not speak, but may whistle or make a soft, hissing sound.

Like many other loa, Damballa is subdivided into spirits who play different roles. For example, Damballa Tocan is a spirit of the intellect. When he manifests in the Petro rites, he is Damballa La Flambo.

Damballa's wife is Ayida Wedo, although in some Vodou societies, she is his sister and in others, Damballa himself after a different fashion. Erzulie is his lover, although, once again, she may be considered his wife in some societies.

== Worship ==
When a serviteur is believed to be possessed by Damballa during a ceremony, he or she moves on the floor like a serpent. A white sheet is laid down for him, and another waved over him to fan and cool him. His purity is such that it cannot be allowed to be exposed to impure or unclean things. Some peristyles maintain a basin full of water into which the possessed will plunge, to swim and cool off.

Offerings to him include milk, white foods and flowers, rice, coconut, orgeat syrup, and a perfume called lotion pompeia. Damballa's symbol is an egg, so his offering par excellence is a white, uncooked egg on a mound of white flour.

== In popular culture ==
In the New York Art Quartet's 1964 album, Amiri Baraka (previously known as LeRoi Jones and Imamu Amear Baraka) recites a spoken-word poem which ends with the words, "may a lost god damballah, rest or save us / against the murders we intend / against his lost white children / black dada nihilismus."

Bahamian folk musician Exuma wrote and recorded the song "Dambala" for his 1970 self-titled album, in which he exhorts Dambala and God to punish slavers. The song was later covered by Nina Simone in many live performances.

A 1981 short story collection by African-American writer John Edgar Wideman is entitled Damballah.

In the Child's Play franchise, Damballa's name is used in the voodoo incantation by the main antagonist Charles Lee Ray / Chucky to transfer his soul into his Good Guy doll host. Damballa himself appears in the third season of the television series Chucky, acting as a god of death and as Chucky's heavenly judge.

== See also ==
- Obatala
- Kengue
- Witchcraft
