= Guede L'Orage =

Spirit in the Haitian Vodou religion

Guede L'Orage (Note: alternative spellings include Guédé L'Orage, Guédé l'Orage, Guédé L'orage, Guede L'orage, Guédé l'orage, Guede l'orage, Guede Lorage Gédé l'Orage, Géde l'Orage, Ghede Loraj) (Haitian Creole: Gede Loraj) is a lwa in the Haitian Vodou religion. This spirit usually only manifests during storms.

Guede L'Orage is the sister of the Guede family. She is the size of a child. She symbolizes storms and sudden death. Those who are possessed by her are repulsed by water. She has the reputation of being a hypocrite.
