= Gede Doub =

Gede Doub is a lwa in Haitian Vodou who can endow people with the gift of "second sight" (clairvoyance).
