= Bondye =

Main creator god in Haitian Vodou

Bondye (Haitian Creole: [bɔ̃dje]), also known as Gran Maître (Haitian Creole: Gran Mèt [gɣã mɛt]), is the supreme creator god in the African diasporic religion of Haitian Vodou. Vodouists believe Bondye was responsible for creating the universe and everything in it, and that he maintains the universal order. Nevertheless, they deem him to be transcendent and thus inaccessible to humans, who must instead interact with spirits called lwas.

Vodou developed among Afro-Haitian communities amid the Atlantic slave trade of the 16th to 19th centuries. It arose through the blending of the traditional religions brought to the island of Hispaniola by enslaved West Africans, many of them Igbo, Yoruba or Fon, and the Roman Catholic teachings of the French colonialists who controlled the island. Bondye took his name from the French language term Bon Dieu ("Good God"). Conceptually, Bondye occupied the role played by God in Roman Catholicism and other forms of Christianity, as well as that of the supreme deity found in various African traditional religions.

== Bondye in Haitian theology ==
Teaching the existence of a single supreme God, Vodou has been described as monotheistic. This entity, the creator of the universe, is called the Bondye or Gran Mèt. The word Bondye is derived from the French Bon Dieu ("Good God").

Bondye occupies the role played by the God of Christianity and by the supreme deity in various African traditional religions, Vodou does not incorporate belief in a powerful antagonist that opposes the supreme being akin to the Christian notion of Satan.

Bondye is seen as the ultimate source of power, responsible for maintaining universal order. Bondye is also regarded as remote and transcendent, not involving itself in human affairs; there is thus little point in approaching it directly. The scholar of religion Leslie Desmangles referred to Bondye as "the Godhead". Haitians will frequently use the phrase si Bondye vle ("if Bondye is willing"), suggesting a belief that all things occur in accordance with this divinity's will.

== Cosmology and mythology ==
Vodou teaches that one of Bondye's first creations was the sun, the appearance of which was necessary for all other things, including laws and humans, to exist. It holds that Bondye then created humanity in his own image out of clay and water.
