= Baron Samedi =

Loa of Haitian Vodou, Louisiana Voodoo and folk beliefs

- Death, tombs, gravestones, cemeteries, dead relatives, obscenities, healing, smoking, drinking, disruption, spirits
- Venerated in: Haitian Vodou, Louisiana Voodoo, Folk Catholicism
- Attributes: Rum, cigar, top hat, glasses with missing lens
- Day: November 2

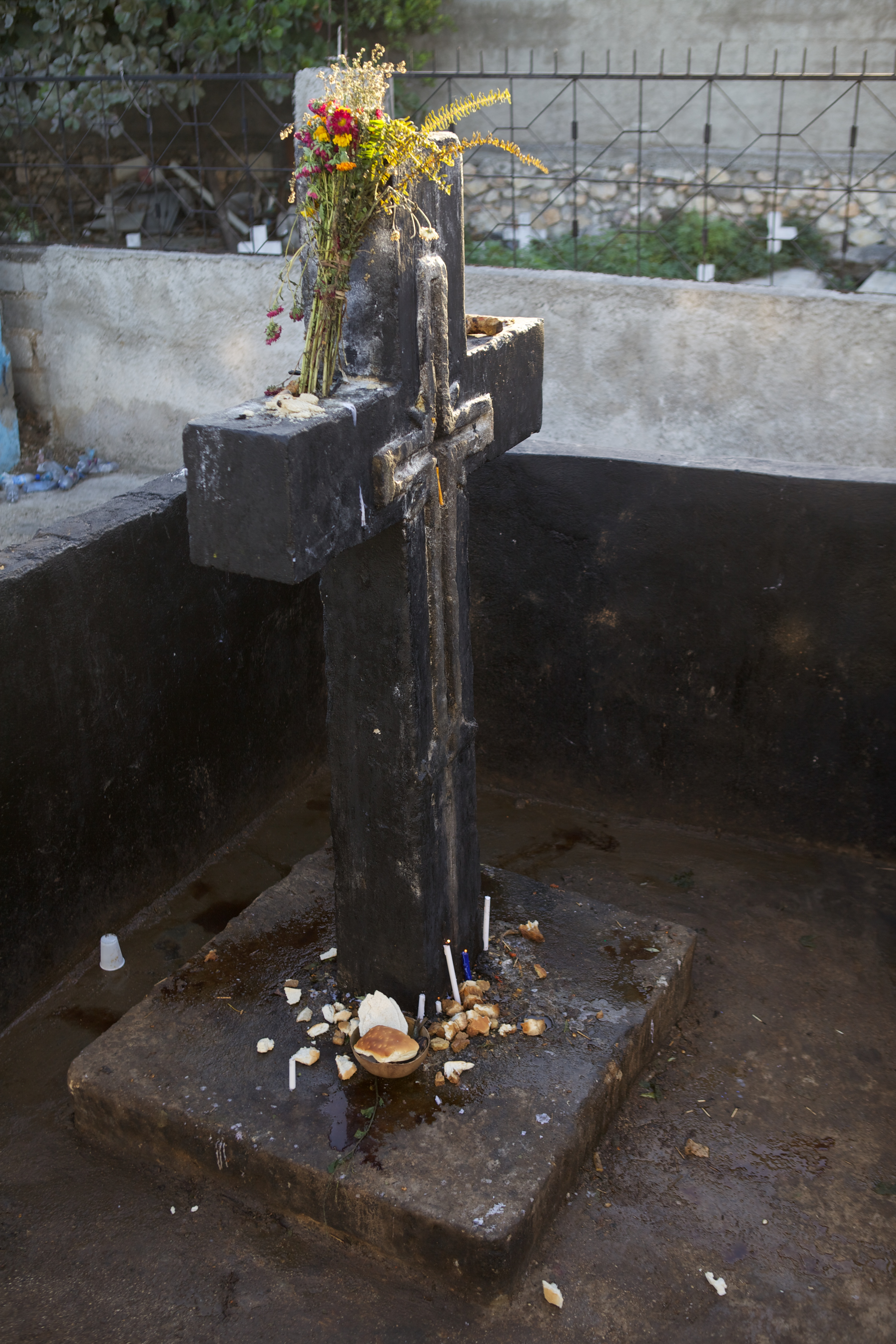
Cross of Baron Samedi

Veve for Baron Samedi

Baron Samedi (English: Baron Saturday), also written Baron Samdi, Bawon Samedi or Bawon Sanmdi, is one of the Lwa of Haitian Vodou. He is a Lwa of the dead, along with Baron's numerous other incarnations Baron Cimetière, Baron La Croix and Baron Criminel.

He is the head of the Gede family of Lwa; his brothers are Azagon Lacroix and Baron Piquant. He is sometimes identified with Guede Nibo.

== Portrayal ==
Baron Samedi is usually depicted with a top hat, black tail coat, dark glasses, and cotton plugs in the nostrils, as if to resemble a corpse dressed and prepared for burial in the Haitian style. He is frequently depicted as a skeleton (but sometimes as a black man that merely has his face painted as a skull) and speaks in a nasal voice. The former dictator of Haiti, François Duvalier, known as Papa Doc, modeled his cult of personality on Baron Samedi; he was often seen speaking in a deep nasal tone and wearing dark glasses.

Baron Samedi is noted for disruption, obscenity, debauchery and having a particular fondness for tobacco and rum. Additionally, he is the loa of resurrection, and in the latter capacity, he is often called upon for healing by those near or approaching death, as he is the only Baron that can accept an individual into the realm of the dead.

Due to affiliation with François Duvalier, Baron Samedi is linked to secret societies in the Haitian government and includes them in his domain.

Baron Samedi spends most of his time in the invisible realm of vodou spirits. He is notorious for his outrageous behavior, swearing continuously and making filthy jokes to the other spirits. He is married to another powerful spirit known as Maman Brigitte, but he often chases after mortal women. Despite his crudeness and vulgarity, the Baron can nevertheless be charming and suave, and he is renowned for his charisma. He loves smoking and drinking and is rarely seen without a cigar in his mouth or a glass of rum in his bony fingers. Baron Samedi can usually be found at the crossroads between the worlds of the dead and the living. When someone dies, he digs their grave, greets their soul after they have been buried, and leads them to the underworld.

== Connection to other loa ==
Baron Samedi is the leader of the Gede, loa with particular links to magic, ancestor worship and death. These lesser spirits are dressed like The Baron and are as rude and crude, but not nearly as charming as their master. They help carry the dead to the underworld.

== Activities ==
Among believers in Vodou, Baron Samedi is the master of the dead as well as a giver of life. It is believed that he can cure mortals of any disease or wound so long as he thinks it is worthwhile. They believe his powers are especially great when it comes to Vodou curses and black magic. This includes the belief that if a person has been afflicted by a hex that brings them to the verge of death, they will not die if The Baron refuses to dig their grave.

In many Haitian cemeteries the longest standing grave of a male is designated as the grave of Baron Samedi. A cross (the kwa Bawon, meaning "Baron's cross") is placed at a crossroads in the cemetery to represent the point where the mortal and spiritual world cross. Often, a black top hat is placed on top of this cross.

== In other media ==
=== Television ===
- Baron Samedi appears in the second season of American Gods, portrayed by Mustafa Shakir.
- In Heroes, a man known as "Baron Samedi" exists with the power of invulnerability and the brother of The Haitian. He was portrayed by Demetrius Grosse.
- In episode 8 of the second season of Cloak & Dagger, Baron Samedi appears as a character played by actor Justin Sams.
- The Canadian animated television series Slugterra features a reoccurring minor antagonist inspired by Baron Samedi named Mr. Saturday (voiced by Scott McNeil).
- Baron Samedi appears in the Supernatural episode "Hammer of the Gods", portrayed by Precious Silburne.
- In Chilling Adventures of Sabrina, the character Mambo Marie LeFleur introduced in Part 3, reveals themselves to be Baron Samedi in Part 4, Episode 6.
- A character named Baron Samedi appears in Grimm in season 2 as a secondary antagonist

=== Film ===
- Baron Samedi is the alias of a villain in the 1973 James Bond adventure Live and Let Die, who is portrayed by Geoffrey Holder.
- Baron Samedi appears in Sugar Hill, portrayed by Don Pedro Colley.
- Baron Samedi appears in Zombi Child, portrayed by Nehémy Pierre-Dahomey.
- The Disney villain character Dr. Facilier in the 2009 animated film The Princess and the Frog is inspired by Baron Samedi.

=== Video games ===
- Baron Samedi appears as a playable character in the 2014 multiplayer online battle arena game Smite.
- Baron Samedi appears as a playable character in the James Bond games GoldenEye 007 (1997), James Bond 007: Nightfire (2002), and 007 Legends (2012).
- Baron Samedi appears as a character in Akuji the Heartless (1998).
- A rival gang in the game Saints Row 2 are the Sons of Samedi, a gang with heavy vodou influences.
- A character who styles himself after Baron Samedi in Shadowrun Returns is a Decker allied to the player.
- In World of Warcraft: Battle for Azeroth, there is a character named Bwonsamdi, who is inspired by and styled after Baron Samedi.
- In Disney Twisted-Wonderland, there is a character named Sam inspired by Dr. Facilier. Both characters are dressed and designed after Baron Samedi.

=== Others ===
- Le Baron Samedi is the title of a play written by French philosopher Henry Corbin.
- Baron Samedi has been adapted as two different characters in Marvel Comics.
- Baron Saturday features as a character in the 1991 Terry Pratchett novel Witches Abroad.
- Baron Samedi inspired the character of Chimney Man in the musical Jelly's Last Jam.
- A privilege escalation vulnerability caused by a heap-based buffer overflow in the computer program sudo was named "Baron Samedit" as a combination of "Baron Samedi" and sudoedit (the vulnerable application).
- Baron Samedi inspired the character of Papa Shango in the WWE portrayed by Charles Wright.
- Baron Samedi appears as a playable character in the video board game Nightmare (1991), and he hosts the game's first expansion (where he is played by Wenanty Nosul).
- Baron Saturday, who represents Baron Samedi, appears in the album S.F. Sorrow by The Pretty Things, where he takes the titular character on a trip through the Underworld and shows him horrible truths and revelations about his life.
- Baron Samedi is the title of a song by British rock band 10cc, appearing on their 1974 album, Sheet Music.
- In A Mouthful of Birds, a 1986 play by Caryl Churchill and David Lan, a character tries to connect with Baron Sunday but connects with a completely different British spirit.
- In the ongoing Dungeons and Dragons podcast Legends of Avantris, in the campaign Once Upon a Witchlight, the player character Kremy Lecroux is a warlock, whose patron is said multiple times to be "the Baron".

== Bibliography ==
- Voodoo: Search for the Spirit, “Abrams Discoveries” series. Laënnec Hurbon. Harry N. Abrams, Inc. 1995. "Ghede"
- A Dictionary of World Mythology. Arthur Cotterell. Oxford University Press, 1997. "Vodou".
- The Voodoo Gods. Maya Deren. Granada Publishing Limited 1975.
- Conner, Randy P.; Sparks, David Hatfield; Sparks, Mariya (1998). Cassell's Encyclopedia of Queer Myth, Symbol and Spirit. UK: Cassell. ISBN 0-304-70423-7.
- Taylor, P. (1992). Anthropology and Theology in Pursuit of Justice. Callaloo, 15(3), 811–823. https://doi.org/10.2307/2932023
- Hayes, A. M., & Robinson, M. (2001). Instructional Resources Haitian Art: Exploring Cultural Identity. Art Education, 54(1), 25–32. https://doi.org/10.2307/3193890
