= Gede lwa =

Family of Loa that embody the powers of death and fertility

Gede
- Death and Fertility
- Color: Black, purple
- Festivals: 2 November

The Gede (French: Guede) are the family of lwa, spirits or deities associated with Ancestor worship in Haitian Vodou, that represent the powers of death and fertility. They are often said to be found at burial sites, where they escort the deceased to their afterlife. Gede spirits include Gede Doub, Gede-Linto, Gede L'Orage, Gede Oussou, Gede Nibo and Gede Masaka, and Gede Ti Malice. All are known for the drum rhythm and dance called the "banda". In possession, they will drink or rub themselves with a mixture of clairin (raw rum) and twenty-one scotch bonnet or goat peppers. Fèt Gede is celebrated on 2 November, All Souls' Day ("Festival of the Dead"). Boons granted by the Gede not repaid by this date will be avenged afterwards.

- Papa Gede is the corpse of the first man who ever died. He is recognized as a short, dark man with a high hat on his head who likes to smoke cigars and eat apples. Papa Gede is a psychopomp who waits at the crossroads to take souls into the afterlife. He is considered the good counterpart to Baron Samedi. If a child is dying, Papa Gede is prayed to. It is believed that he will not take a life before its time, and that he will protect the little ones. Papa Gede has a very crass sense of humor, a divine ability to read others' minds, and the ability to know everything that happens in the worlds of the living and the dead.
- Brav Gede is the guardian and watchman of the graveyard. He keeps the dead souls in and the living souls out. He is sometimes considered an aspect of Nibo.
- Gede Bábáco is Papa Gede's lesser-known brother and is also a psychopomp. His role is somewhat similar to that of Papa Gede, but he doesn't have the special abilities of his brother.
- Gede Nibo is a psychopomp, an intermediary between the living and the dead. He was the first person to die by violence, so he is the patron of those who died by unnatural causes (disaster, accident, misadventure, or violence). He is the guardian of the graves of those who died prematurely, particularly those whose final resting place is unknown. His chevals ("horses", possessed devotees) can give voice to the dead spirits whose bodies have not been found or that have not been reclaimed from "below the waters".
- Baron Criminel ("Baron of Criminals") is the enforcer of the Gede. He was the first person to kill another (probably Nibo). As the first murderer, he is master of those who murder or use violence to harm others. Families of murder victims and the abused pray to him to get revenge on those who wronged them. His "horses" have an insatiable appetite and will attack people until they are offered food. If it doesn't please them or takes too long, they will bite and chew on anyone nearby (or even themselves) until they are sated. He is syncretized with St. Martin de Porres, perhaps because his feast day is November 3, the day after Fèt Gede. He is sacrificed black roosters that have been bound, doused with strong spirit, and then set alight.
- Maman Brigitte ("Mother Bridget") is the wife of Baron Samedi. She is syncretized with St. Brigid, perhaps because she is the protector of crosses and gravestones.

== Marassa: The divine twins ==
The Gede lwa have their own versions of the Twins, which appear as gravediggers. Twins are seen as having divine insight and vision. They are also part of the material world and the spiritual world (in their case, the living and the dead). They usually wear contrasting colors.

Gede Masaka assists Gede Nibo. He is an androgynous male gravedigger and spirit of the dead, recognized by his black shirt, white jacket, and white headscarf.

Gede Oussou wears a black or mauve jacket marked on the back with a white cross and a black or mauve headscarf. His name means "tipsy" due to his love of white rum. Gede Oussou is sometimes also linked with the female Gede L'Oraille.

== Bawon Gede ==
The Gede are closely associated with the lwa, Bawon, whose aspects are Bawon Samdi (Baron Saturday) - ruler of the graveyard, Baron La Croix (Baron of the Cross) - guardian of the gravestone, and Baron Cimetière (Baron of the Cemetery) - guardian of the grave. Depending on the tradition followed, Bawon is:

1. one of the Gede
2. their spiritual protector, who has raised them from the dead with the help of Bawon Samdi's wife, Maman Brigitte.
3. An aspect of the Gede gods.

In any of these configurations, Bawon, Maman Brigitte, and the Gede rule death, the cemetery, and the grave.

== See also ==
- Chthonic deities – Deities or spirits of the underworld
- Gedevi people – Historic ethnic group in Benin

== Sources ==
- Voodoo: Search for the Spirit, "Abrams Discoveries" series. Laënnec Hurbon. Harry N. Abrams, Inc. 1995.
- A Dictionary of World Mythology. Arthur Cotterell. Oxford University Press, 1997.
