= Folk Catholicism =

Variety of regional or ethnic expressions of Catholicism

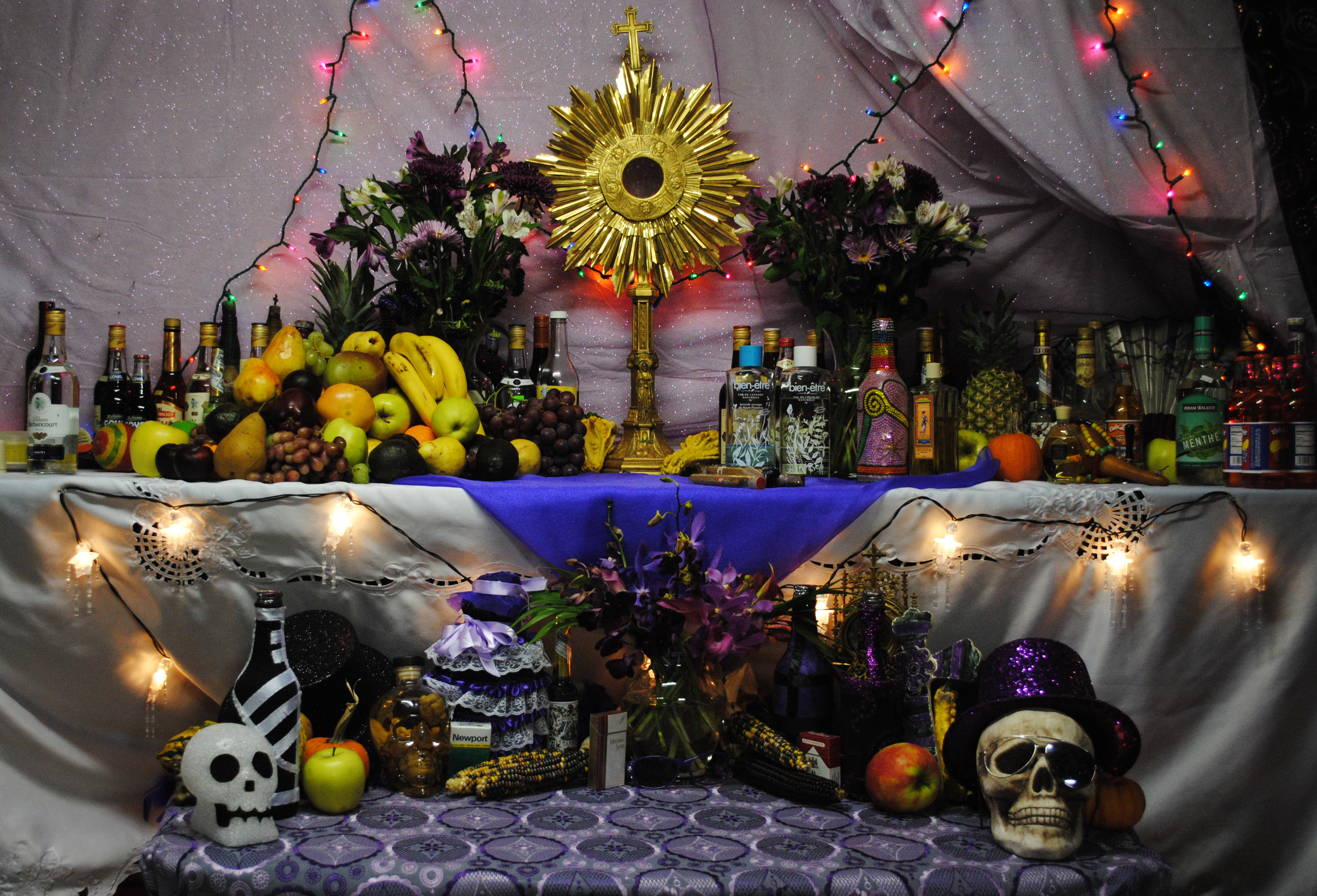
Vodou altar celebrating Papa Guédé in Boston, Massachusetts, featuring offerings to Rada spirits, the Petwo family, and the Gede. In the center is a golden monstrance.

Folk Catholicism can be broadly described as various ethnic expressions and practices of Catholicism intermingled with aspects of folk religion. Practices have varied from place to place and may at times contradict the official doctrines and practices of the Catholic Church.

== Description ==
Some forms of folk Catholic practices are based on syncretism with non-Christian or otherwise non-Catholic beliefs or religions. Some of these folk Catholic forms have come to be identified as separate religions, as is the case with Caribbean and Brazilian syncretism between Catholicism and West African religions, which include Haitian Vodou, Cuban Santería, and Brazilian Candomblé. Other syncretized forms, such as the syncretism between Catholic practice and indigenous American belief systems common in Maya communities of Guatemala and Quechua communities of Peru, are typically not described by their practitioners or by outsiders as separate religions; their practitioners generally consider themselves Roman Catholic in both name and practice.

Still other folk Catholic practices are local elaborations of Catholic custom that the Roman Catholic Church does not deem contradictory to Roman Catholic doctrine and practice. Examples include compadrazgo in modern Iberia, Latin America, and the Philippines, which developed from standard medieval European Catholic practices that fell out of favor in Europe after the seventeenth century; the veneration of some local saints, and pilgrimages in medieval and modern Europe.

Folk Catholic practices occur where Catholicism is a major religion, not only in the oft-cited cases of Latin America and the West Indies. Folk accommodations between Catholicism and local beliefs can be found in Gaelic Scotland, Ireland, Spain, Portugal, France, Italy, Poland, Germany, Austria, the Philippines, and southern India.

In Ireland, openly Catholic worship was banned due to the Penal Laws. This led to storytellers inventing their own tales to teach the Gospel or add further lessons. These further lessons however often ended up contradicting the teaching of the Catholic Church. Within these stories a variety of recurring characters and themes appear such as the Virgin Mary, priests, Paul the Apostle, Satan, and Jesus himself.

In the Philippines, the custom of Simbang Gabi developed from the farming community. Simbang Gabi is a devotional nine-day series of Masses leading up to Christmas. On the last day of the Simbang Gabi, which is Christmas Eve, the service is instead called Misa de Gallo (Spanish for 'Rooster's Mass'). It has an important role in Philippine culture. It has its origins in the early days of Spanish rule over the Philippines as a practical compromise for farmers, who began work before sunrise to avoid the noonday heat out in the fields. Despite being exhausted by a long day's labor, the people would still attend the customary evening novenas. In 1669, the priests began to say Mass in the early mornings instead of the evening novenas more common in the rest of the Hispanic world. This cherished Christmas custom eventually became a distinct feature of Philippine culture and became a symbol of sharing.

The Catholic Church takes a pragmatic and patient stance towards folk Catholicism. For example, it may permit pilgrimages to the site of reported apparitions (e.g. Međugorje) without endorsing or condemning belief in the reported apparitions and will often declare Marian apparitions and similar miracles "worthy of belief" (e.g. Our Lady of Fatima) or will confirm the cult of local saints without actually endorsing or recommending belief. When the Catholic Church considers that there is a blatant heresy occurring, it actively rejects it and tells Catholics to stay away from such practices. This is the case of the cult of Santa Muerte (Saint Death, a personification and veneration of death). The Church has condemned the cult as blasphemous, calling it a "degeneration of religion".

== Global examples ==
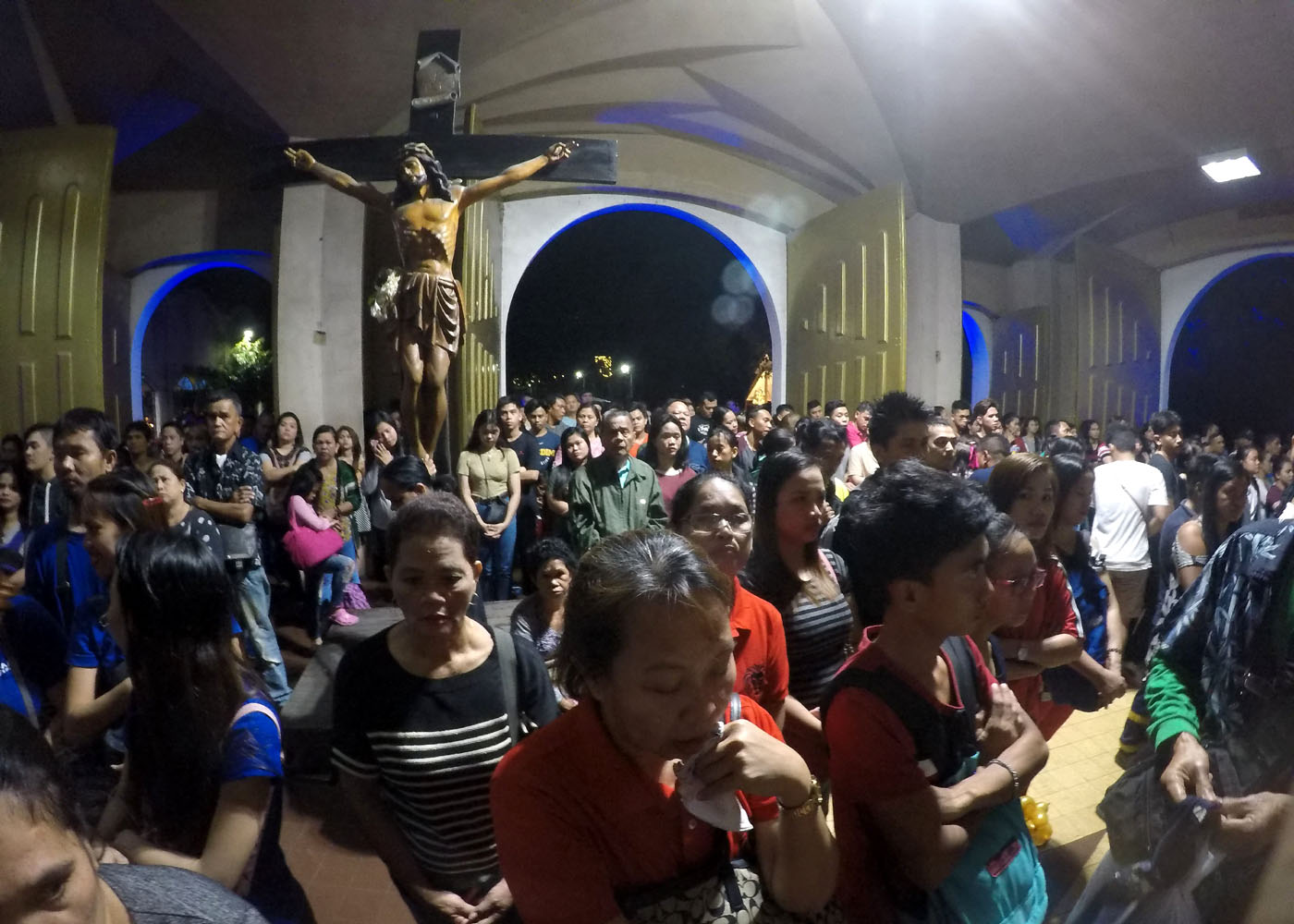
Participants at one of the Simbang Gabi masses

=== Haiti ===
One of the biggest and well-known folk religions is Haitian Vodou, commonly known as voodoo. Vodou first appeared in Haiti in the 17th century, and has grown to a large religion which has over 60 million adherents globally.

Vodou, originally called Vodu in the Fon language meaning "god" or "spirit", began in tribal regions of the Dahomey Kingdom now located within the present-day West African country of Benin. Vodu was the religion for many people in this part of West Africa. Vodu is where the rhythmic drum beating which became a big part of worship and the spirits known as lwa originate from. Once they arrived in Haiti, the enslaved people were forbidden from practicing any religion except Christianity by their owners. Many slaves were baptized. In order to continue worship, they adopted Catholic saints and traditions. The saints became stand-ins for their lwa; Saint Peter, for instance, was Legba. In this manner, they were able to practice their traditional religion while pleasing the slave owner at the same time. Something similar happened with enslaved Africans brought to other countries as well, though Vodou is one of the best examples of the syncretism that occurred between Catholicism and native West African beliefs.

=== Philippines ===
In the Philippines, among the most relevant celebration of popular Catholicism is the novena Christmas known as Simbang Gabi, which arose within the farming community and consists of a nine-day devotional gesture of masses in preparation for Christmas. On the last day of Simbang Gabi, which coincides with Christmas Eve, the most important service is held, called in Spanish Misa de Gallo ('Mass of the Rooster').

This is an ancient tradition celebrated since 1669, brought to the Philippines by Spanish missionaries: originally, the nine masses were held very early in the morning, because most of the country's inhabitants were farmers who had to go to work before dawn, to avoid being in the fields during the hottest hours of the day.

While evening novenas were more common in the rest of the Hispanic world, this Christmas custom eventually became a distinctive feature of Philippine culture and a symbol of shared participation of popular faith.

Often times, Folk Catholicism in the Philippines syncretizes with local traditions with origins from the Philippines' Animist, Hindu, Buddhist, and Islamic, precolonial kingdoms; neighboring states; or allied Hispanic communities from Spain, and Latin America.. A notable example of this is the folk Catholic saint of the Black Nazarene.

=== Europe ===
==== Italy ====
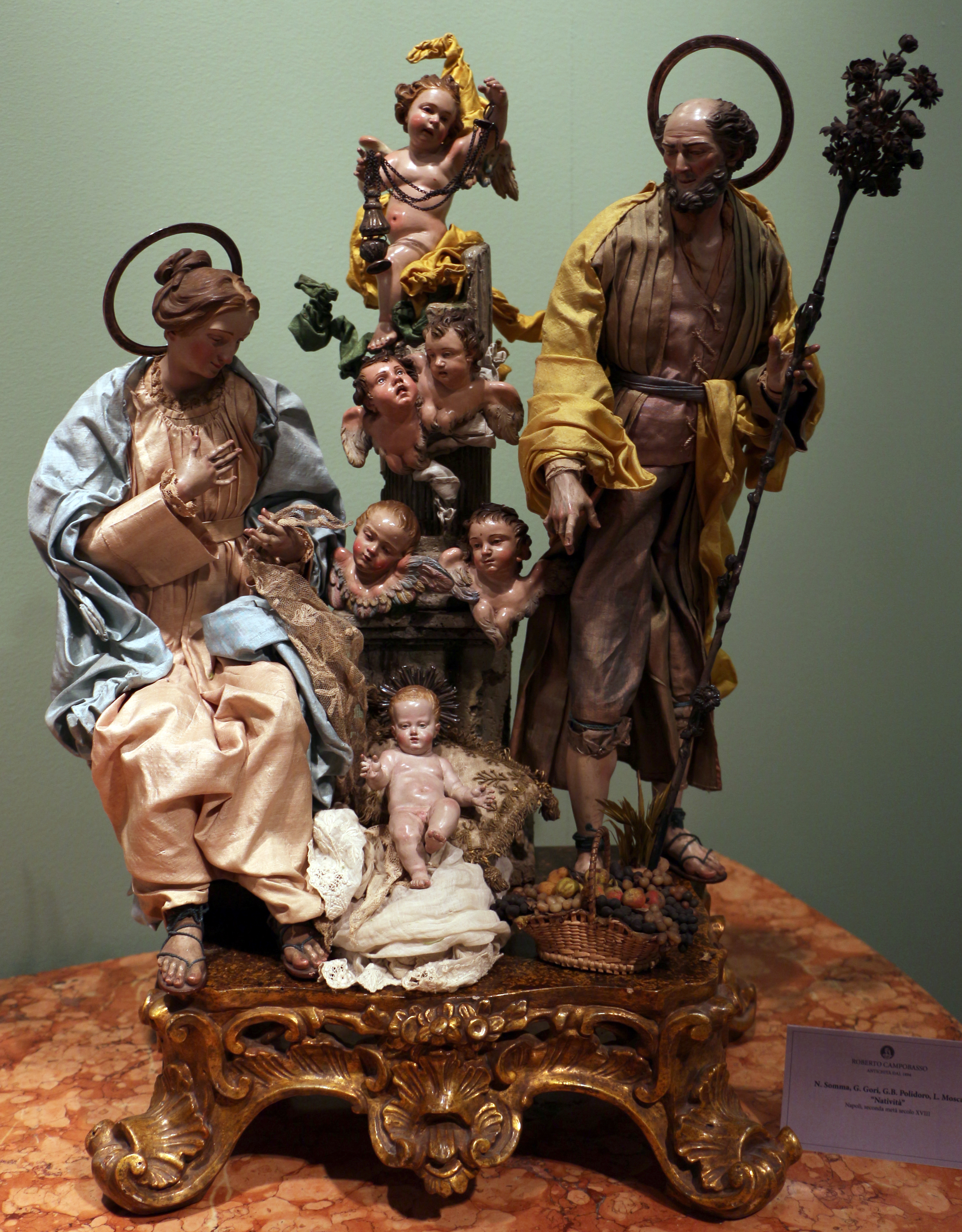
Neapolitan crib figures

In Italy, the spread of popular Catholicism is due to three main factors:

- the regional sense of belonging to the Catholic Church, which has its headquarters in Italy;
- diffuse traditional forms of devotion towards Jesus, Madonnas, angels, saints and patrons that are present in every Italian region and linked to sanctuaries, symbols, relics and religious holidays;
- the charitable and cultural activities of local Catholic aggregations.

Events that contributed to the formation of popular Italian Catholicism include the Counter-Reformation, the Council of Trent, and then the social and civil commitment of the Catholic movement between the nineteenth and twentieth centuries.

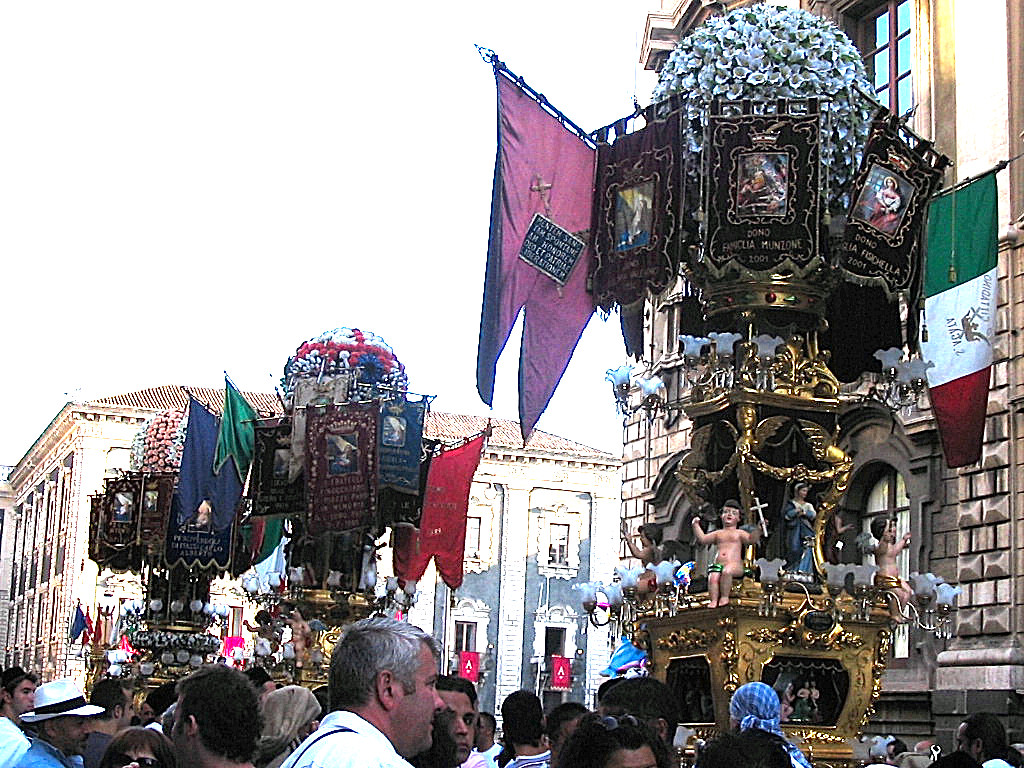
Candelore for the feast of Sant'Agata in Catania

Among the most popular saints and patrons in Italy are San Pio (Padre Pio), Saint Anthony of Padua, Saint Francis of Assisi (San Francesco), Santa Rita of Cascia, Saint Joseph, Saint Michael, Mother Teresa, Saint Clare of Assisi, Saint Rosalia, Januarius, Saint Agatha, Saint Ambrose, and Saint Catherine of Siena. Simon of Trent is also amongst popular figures of Italian folk Catholicism.

To the Italian peasantry, the presence of the sacred was associated with rites of traditional magic called benedicaria.

==== Ireland ====
Ireland has a rich heritage of folk Catholicism. Among the many customs and practices is the tradition of holy wells. These sacred wells are scattered throughout Ireland and are visited by people seeking bodily cures, for example eye ailments. The holy wells contain water blessed by a Catholic priest or bishop and are usually dedicated to one of a myriad of native Irish saints, for example St. Senan's holy well on Scattery Island.

Another tradition is the holy ribbon. The most famous being the Brat Bhride in honour of Saint Brigid. This is a piece of cloth or ribbon which is left over night on a windowsill on the eve of the saint's feast day. The belief is that the saint will pass through Ireland that night and touch the ribbon which is then kept by individuals and venerated as a holy object which may be used to help the sick or for protection. Other examples of the holy ribbon include the Ribin Cainnear in honour of St. Cainnear and St. Gobnait's Measure. Another custom in Ireland sees people take a piece of straw from the crib in a church at Christmas and this is supposed to bring financial security for the year ahead.

==== Germany ====
The chapel of Amorsbrunn in the town of Amorbach, in the Franconian region of Bavaria, has a fountain that is purported to help in conceiving children when bathed in. It is a pilgrimage site for both Christians and non-Christians. The water's purported powers and the pilgrimage to them predate the construction of the chapel. The pre-existing sacred site was intentionally incorporated into the newly built medieval Catholic chapel thus creating a "cult of continuity"; the water's powers were then attributed to "some medieval Catholic saints". These, however, "appear as spurious, being poorly motivated." The site's power was previously attributed to a Germanic legendary figure called Mother Holle, who became a venerated figure there. More generally, Mother Holle lives on as a fairy tale character, weather maker, specifically a snow maker, and general cultural figure, even appearing in movies based on the fairy tale named for her.

=== Asia ===
In China, Korea and Vietnam, Catholics also practice traditional ancestral veneration.

=== Latin America ===
==== Mexico ====
Folk Catholicism is also strongly present in modern Mexico. Before Spanish colonization, the indigenous peoples in modern-day Mexico practiced various forms of religion, notably the polytheistic Maya and Aztec religions. Both had several gods dedicated to nature and various aspects of daily life. Mictlāntēcutli was the main Aztec God of death, and it was believed that a person would undertake a long and treacherous journey to reach the afterlife, where their fate was determined by the circumstances of their life and death. Mayans believed in multiple Gods of death, and followed a similar belief system that upon death, one must undertake a journey in order to reach the afterlife in the realm of Xibalbá.

Following Spanish colonization, the indigenous population was forcibly converted to Catholicism. Indigenous political leaders that challenged Spanish rule were murdered and symbols of those indigenous practices were destroyed. A significant portion of Mexico today identify as Catholic, but report that they retain beliefs of witchcraft, reincarnation and communication with the dead.

However, some aspects of these indigenous religions persevered and those influences can be seen in cultural religious practices that exist today alongside Catholicism.

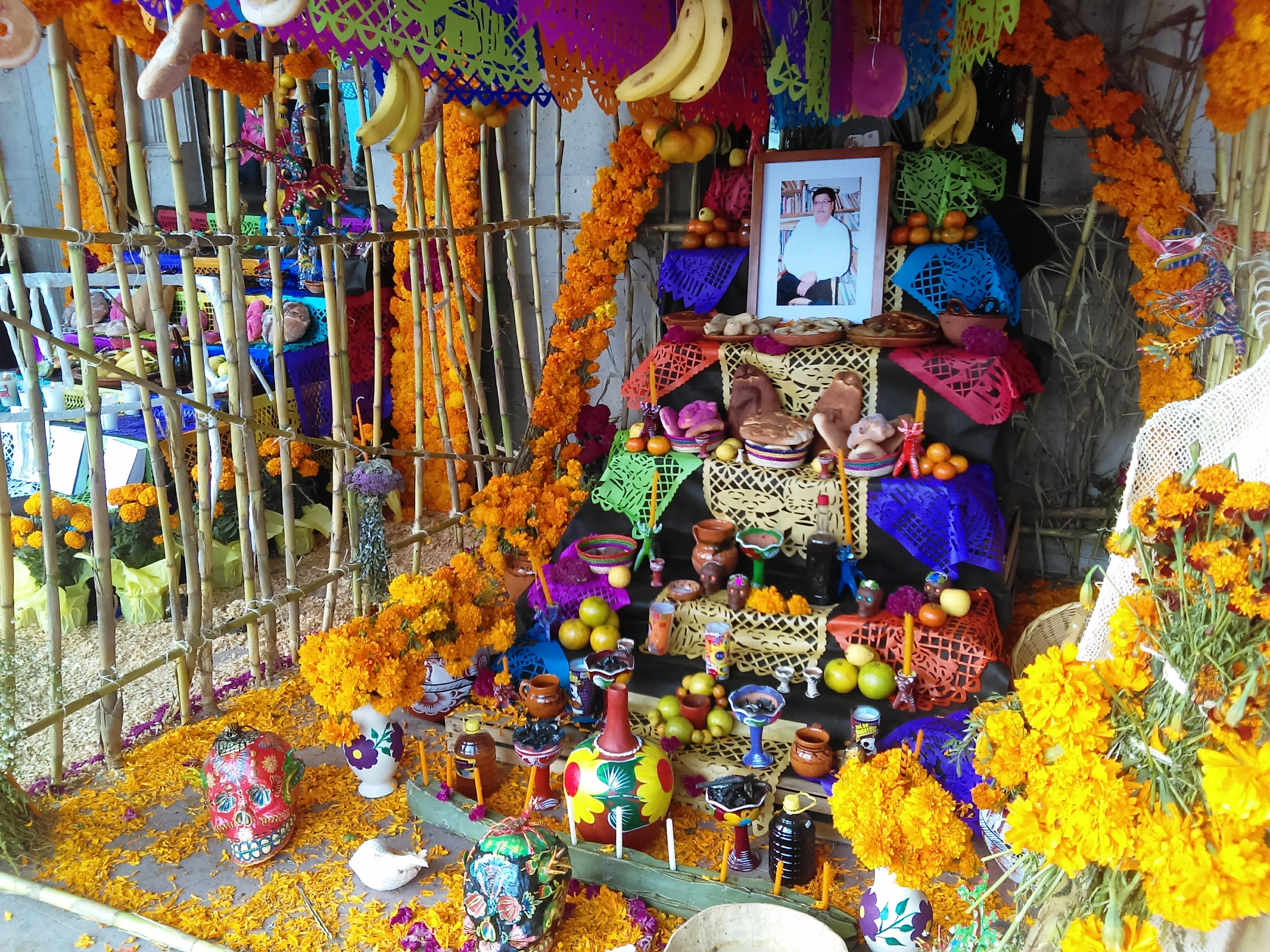
Altar de Día de Muertos en Actopan, Hidalgo, México (2016)

Día de Los Muertos is a regional holiday in Mexico and throughout Latin America rooted in ancient Mesoamerican religious beliefs. It is intended to honor the lives of the deceased through practices like offerings, music, and dance. It presents a view of the afterlife that blends both Mesoamerican and Catholic religious beliefs, with a cultural influence. Catholicism believes in Hell, Purgatory and Heaven as well as resurrection, similar to the Aztec belief that ones' actions in life determine their afterlife. Both Día de Los Muertos and Catholicism hold the belief that the soul is separate from the body and continues to exist after death. It also mixes Catholic and Aztec symbolism. The Aztecs used images of skulls and skeletons, as well as elaborate costumes to make the dead feel welcome as seen in the symbol of La Catrina. Symbols of Catholicism are also prominent, most notably in the form of imagery of crucifixes, Jesus Christ and La Virgen de Guadalupe. These symbols can be seen across Mexico between late October and early November. Celebrated between November 1 and 2, it also coincides with Catholic holiday All Saints' Day on November 2. La Catrina is one of the most famous skeletal symbols of Dia de Los Muertos. Originally named Calavera Garbancera, creator José Guadalupe Posada designed her as a satirization of class struggle within Mexico, and the wealthy's attempts to mimic European standards. Diego Rivera would include her in his painting, Sueño de una Tarde Dominical en la Alameda Central, alongside imagery of Mexican history. Her skeletal appearance reflects Aztec and Mayan depictions of the gods of death. Today, she's seen as a symbol of death throughout Mexico.

Furthermore, many other religious figures in Mexico stem from a blend of Catholicism and regional beliefs.

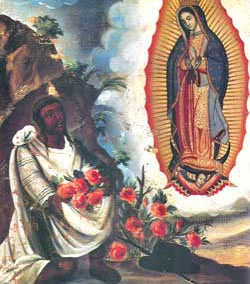
Second Apparition of La Virgen de Guadalupe, Collection of the Museum of the Basilica of Guadalupe

La Virgen de Guadalupe, or Our Lady of Guadalupe, is one of the most well-known example of regional stories influencing the culture of Catholicism within Mexico, as well as one of the most well-known examples of Marian Apparitions. The story of Our Lady of Guadalupe is that she appeared to Juan Diego in Tepeyac, Mexico in 1531 and asked him to build a shrine for her. After the Archbishop requested proof, he would return to where he had seen her appear. She would gather Castilian roses, which do not grow in Mexico, into his tilma, and told him to return to the archbishop. When he unraveled his tilma, the image of Our Lady of Guadalupe was imprinted onto it. Her image varies from other depictions of the Virgin Mary, with more elaborate clothing and tanner skin. Furthermore, the story is significant because Diego would become the first indigenous American Catholic saint. Our Lady of Guadalupe remains the most famous symbol of Mexican Catholicism.

La Santa Muerte is another one of the various symbols of uniquely Mexican Catholic beliefs. An Inquisition report in 1797 is the first recorded mention of a skeletal figure named Santa Muerte. Depicted as a skeletal figure with a robe, she is an informal folk saint that has gained popularity in Mexico over time, although she is not acknowledged as a saint by the Catholic Church. Her appearance is similar to Aztec depictions of death, with a focus on the skeletal figure such as in the depictions of Mictlāntēcutli and La Catrina.

== See also ==
- Folk Orthodoxy
- Popular piety
- Christian mysticism
- Folk saints
