= Adya Houn'tò =

Drumming loa

Adya Hount'tò is a loa associated with drumming in West African Vodun.
