= Papa Legba =

Ginen in Haitian Vodou

- Veve of Papa Legba
- Venerated in: West African Vodun, Haitian Vodou, Louisiana Voodoo, Folk Catholicism, Dominican Vudú and Winti
- Day: June 13

Papa Legba is a lwa, or loa, in West African Vodun and its diasporic derivatives (Dominican Republic Vudú, Haitian Vodou, Louisiana Voodoo, and Winti), who serves as the intermediary between God and humanity. He stands at a spiritual crossroads and gives (or denies) permission to speak with the spirits of Guineé, and is believed to speak all human languages. In Haiti, he is the great elocutioner. Legba facilitates communication, speech, and understanding. He is commonly associated with dogs. Papa Legba is invoked at the beginning of every ceremony. Papa Legba has his origins in Yoruba traditions in the historic West African kingdom of Dahomey, located within present-day Benin.

== Representation and history ==
In Opening up communication between humanity and the spirit world is the vodún of the crossroads, known in Fon as Lɛgbà, and in Ewe and Mina as Elegba. This figure may have been absorbed from the Yoruba, among whom he is called Elegba or Eshu-Elegba. Ẹlẹ́gbára means the "master of force" in the Yoruba language. In African diaspora religions derived from Yoruba ways, such as Santería (Cuba) and Candomblé (Brazil), he corresponds to the orisha Elegua.

He is often the first spirit consulted for a new endeavour. Visually, he is characterised by his large erection.

== Appearance ==
He usually appears as an old man on a crutch or with a cane, wearing a broad-brimmed straw hat and smoking a pipe, or drinking dark rum. The dog is sacred to him. Legba is syncretized with Saint Peter, Saint Lazarus, and Saint Anthony. His veve incorporates a walking cane on the right side. Offerings to him typically include candy, tobacco, and strong black coffee.

Legba is a favorite lwa of children due to his jolly, grandpa-like image. He is often tasked with babysitting and distracting children (a typical male role in the matrilineal religion) while more serious rituals are being performed by the adults.

== In popular culture ==
In his study of the Delta blues, Robert Palmer discusses the appearance of Legba in blues lyrics and lore. Palmer notes that Legba can be referred to/identified as "the Devil", "Papa Legba", and "The Black Man" throughout the history of the blues. This is also made clear in ethnomusicologist Bruno Blum's text for the CD box set Voodoo in America where reference to Papa Legba, deity of roads and crossroads, in Robert Johnson's iconic song "Crossroads" is explained.

There is extensive referencing to voodoo in the Sprawl trilogy (1984-1988) by William Gibson. In the second book, Count Zero (1986), Papa Legba stands at the gateway to cyberspace as the "master of roads and pathways," with other loa appearing throughout the book. Papa Legba and Voodoo appear again in Spook Country (2007), a book from one of Gibson's other trilogies.

A 1985 episode of the TV series Miami Vice (Season 2, Episode 8, "Tale of the Goat") centers on a malign Vodou priest by the name of Papa Legba (played by Clarence Williams III). In keeping with the image of Legba often conceptualised in Haitian Vodou subculture, Papa Legba is depicted as "controlling" the gateway to the spiritual world (through the use of drugs), walking with the aid of crutches, and smoking a pipe.

The musical group Talking Heads made a song named after him. The song can be found on their 1986 album (and soundtrack to the David Byrne film of the same name), True Stories. In the film, this song is sung by Pops Staples, whose character performs a kind of love ritual.

Papa Legba is a recurring character in American Horror Story, appearing in the third, eighth, and thirteenth seasons, as a gatekeeper of the afterlife. He is an acquaintance of Marie Laveau, having granted her immortality in exchange for the offering of one innocent every year. Papa Legba’s portrayal in the show has attracted some criticism, with many noting that the portrayal of Papa Legba was more similar to Baron Samedi than the mythical Papa Legba himself.

The 1991 Terry Pratchett novel Witches Abroad features a black cockerel named Legba as part of a voodoo-themed subplot set in a pseudo-New Orleans.

In the 2024 film Kraven the Hunter, the titular protagonist (Aaron Taylor-Johnson) develops supernatural abilities after receiving a potion derived from the traditional spiritual scholarship of Papa Legba by the grandmother of the film's primary female protagonist, Calypso (Ariana DeBose).

== See also ==
- Eṣu
- Elegua
- The Father of Spirits

== Sources ==
- Landry, Timothy R. (2019). Vodún: Secrecy and the Search for Divine Power. Contemporary Ethnography. Philadelphia: University of Pennsylvania Press. ISBN 978-0812250749.
- Rush, Diana (2017) [2013]. Vodun in Coastal Bénin: Unfinished, Open-Ended, Global. Critical Investigations of the African Diaspora. Nashville: Vanderbilt University Press. ISBN 978-0826519085.
