= Dinclinsin =

Dinclinsin is a loa depicted as a white colonial slave owner, feared for his temper and cruelty in Haitian Vodou. He often carries a whip and is recognizable by his habit of putting whatever is given to him in his pockets. One of his favorite tricks is being able to pour rum into his pockets without getting them wet.
