= Veve =

Religious symbol commonly used in different branches of Vodun

A veve (also spelled vèvè or vevè) is a religious symbol commonly used in different branches of Vodun throughout the African diaspora, such as Haitian Vodou and Louisiana Voodoo. The veve acts as a "beacon" for the lwa, and will serve as a lwa's representation during rituals.

Veves should not be confused with the anaforuanas used in Abakuá, the firmas used in Palo, nor the pontos riscados used in Candomblé, Umbanda, and Quimbanda, as these are separate Afro-American religions.

== History ==
Possible origins include the cosmogram of the Kongo people, or originated as the Nsibidi system of writing for the Ekoid languages from West and Central Africa.

== Function ==
According to Milo Rigaud, "The veves represent figures of the astral forces... In the course of Vodou ceremonies, the reproduction of the astral forces represented by the veves obliges the lwa... to descend to earth."

Every lwa has their own unique veve, although regional differences have led to different veves for the same lwa in some cases. Sacrifices and offerings are usually placed upon them, with food and drink being most commonly used.

== Presentation ==
In ritual and other formalities, veve is usually drawn on the floor by strewing a powder-like substance, commonly cornmeal, wheat flour, bark, red brick powder, or gunpowder, though the material depends entirely upon the ritual. In Haitian Vodou, a mixture of cornmeal and wood ash is used.

Veves use symbolic imagery to identify the spirit being invoked. For example, the gatekeeper spirit Papa Legba is represented by a vèvè featuring a walking cane, symbolizing his friendly, grandfatherly nature. These designs often include coded elements reflecting the artist's matrilineal and patrilineal heritage. Offerings are typically presented; in Louisiana Voodoo, this may include coffee and candies associated with the spirit.

The spirit is generally meant to be invoked in the central cross of the veve.

Veve can be made into screenprint, painting, patchwork, etc., as wall hangings, artworks, and banners.

== Examples ==
Veve of Ayizan

Veve of Baron Samedi

Veve of Maman Brigitte

Veve of Damballah Weddo

Veve of Papa Legba

Veve of Ogoun

== See also ==
- Sigil
