= Leslie Desmangles =

Leslie G Desmangles is an author and college professor focusing his research on Haiti and religion.

Leslie G. Desmangles was born in Port-au-Prince (Haiti) on September 28, 1941. Professor Desmangles graduated from Eastern University in 1964 with a B.A. in Music, from Palmer Seminary in Philadelphia with an M. Div. in Theology, and from Temple University in 1975 with a Ph.D. in Anthropology of Religion, specializing in Caribbean and African Studies. He has been a professor at Trinity College since 1978 and is currently the Charles A. Dana Research Professor of Religion and International Studies. Leslie G. Desmangles has received awards from the Connecticut General Assembly and Governor John G. Rowland for commitment and service to the state of Connecticut, the Teacher of the Year award from the Haitian American Alliance and was honored by U.S. Ambassador William Swing in recognition for contributions in promoting mutual understanding between Haiti and the United States

Leslie Desmangles won the 1994 Choice Outstanding Academic Book Award for his book The Faces of the Gods: Vodou and Roman Catholicism in Haiti.

== Publications ==
- Desmangles, Leslie G."The People of the Lonely Star: Judaism in the Caribbean." Oxford Handbook of Caribbean Religions. Oxford University Press,2024.
- Desmangles, Leslie G."Black Soul Rising in the Rastafari Communities." in Oxford Handbook of Caribbean Religions. Oxford University Press, 2024.
- Desmangles, Leslie G. and Elizabeth McAlister. "Religion in Post-Earthquake Haiti" in Haiti Rising: Haitian History, Culture and the Earthquake of 2010. Liverpool: Liverpool University Press,2010.
- Desmangles, Leslie G."Haiti Laid Low." Religion in the News. Vol. 13, No 1, Summer 2010.
- Desmangles, Leslie G. "The Faces of the Cosmic God," in Perspectives on the Caribbean: A Reader in Culture, History and Representations. Philip W.Scher, editor. New York: Wiley, 2009.
- Desmangles, Leslie G.“Vilokan."Encyclopedia of African Religions. New York: Routledge, 2009.
- Desmangles, Leslie G. “African Interpretations of the Christian Vodou Cross.” In Invisible Powers: Vodou in Haitian Life and Culture. New York: Palgrave Macmillan, chapter 3, 2006.
- Desmangles, Leslie G. " Creolization of Religion." In Encyclopedia of Religion. Vol. 3, New York: The Macmillan Company, p. 2065–2069, 2005.
- Desmangles, Leslie G. " Understanding Caribbean Religions." In Understanding the Contemporary Caribbean. Lynne Rienner Publishers, Chapter 10, 2004.
- Desmangles, Leslie G. " Vodou." In Encyclopedia of Religious Rituals. New York: Routledge, p. 437-440, 2003.
- Desmangles, Leslie G., associate editor. Encyclopedia of African and African American Religions. New York: Routledge, 2001.
- Desmangles, Leslie G. Haiti in the Global Context. Edited inaugural issue of Journal of Haitian Studies, 1995.
- Desmangles, Leslie G., and Etzel Cardeña. "Trance Possession, Vodou Rituals and Psychotherapy in Haiti." In Jahrbuch fur Transkulturelle Medizin und Psychotherapie. Internationalen Instituts fur Kulturvergleichende Therapieforschung, Universitat Koblenz/ Landau, Nr 6. December 1995, pp. 297–307.
- Desmangles, Leslie G. The Faces of the Gods: Vodou and Roman Catholicism in Haiti. Chapel Hill and London: University of North Carolina Press. (A 1994 Choice outstanding academic book).
