= Rada lwa =

Major family of loa in Haitian Vodou

The Rada are a family of lwa spirits in the religion of Haitian Vodou. They are regarded as being sweet-tempered and "cool". In this, they contrast with the Petro lwa, which are regarded as volatile and "hot".

== Description ==
The Rada lwa have been described as a "pantheon" of deities in Haitian Vodou. The Rada lwa are deemed sweet-natured and dependable. In this, they contrast with the Petwo lwa, who are deemed volatile and hot-tempered.

The Rada are referred to as lwa rasin, meaning "root lwa." As they are often regarded as having an intimate relationship with their worshippers, they are often given names implying a family connection, such as Papa ("father") and Kouzen ("cousin").

The Petwo lwa are kept separate from the Rada lwa, both spatially, by placing their altars in different parts of the ounfo (temple), and temporally, by invoking them at different stages in a ritual.

== History ==
The Rada pantheon have West African origins; specifically, the pantheon of Rada lwa and their associated rituals derives from Arada in Dahomey. "Rada" is a cognate of Allada.

== Identities ==
Ezili Freda is a Rada lwa.

Some Rada loa are: Legba, Loco, Ayizan, Damballa, Ayida Wedo, Freda, and Agwé.

Ogou is a lwa who does not fit neatly into either the Petwo or Rada nanchon. Although he carries weaponry, which is associated with the Petwo, he is seen as the defender of the Rada values.
