= Petwo lwa =

Family of loa (spirits) in Haitian Vodou religion

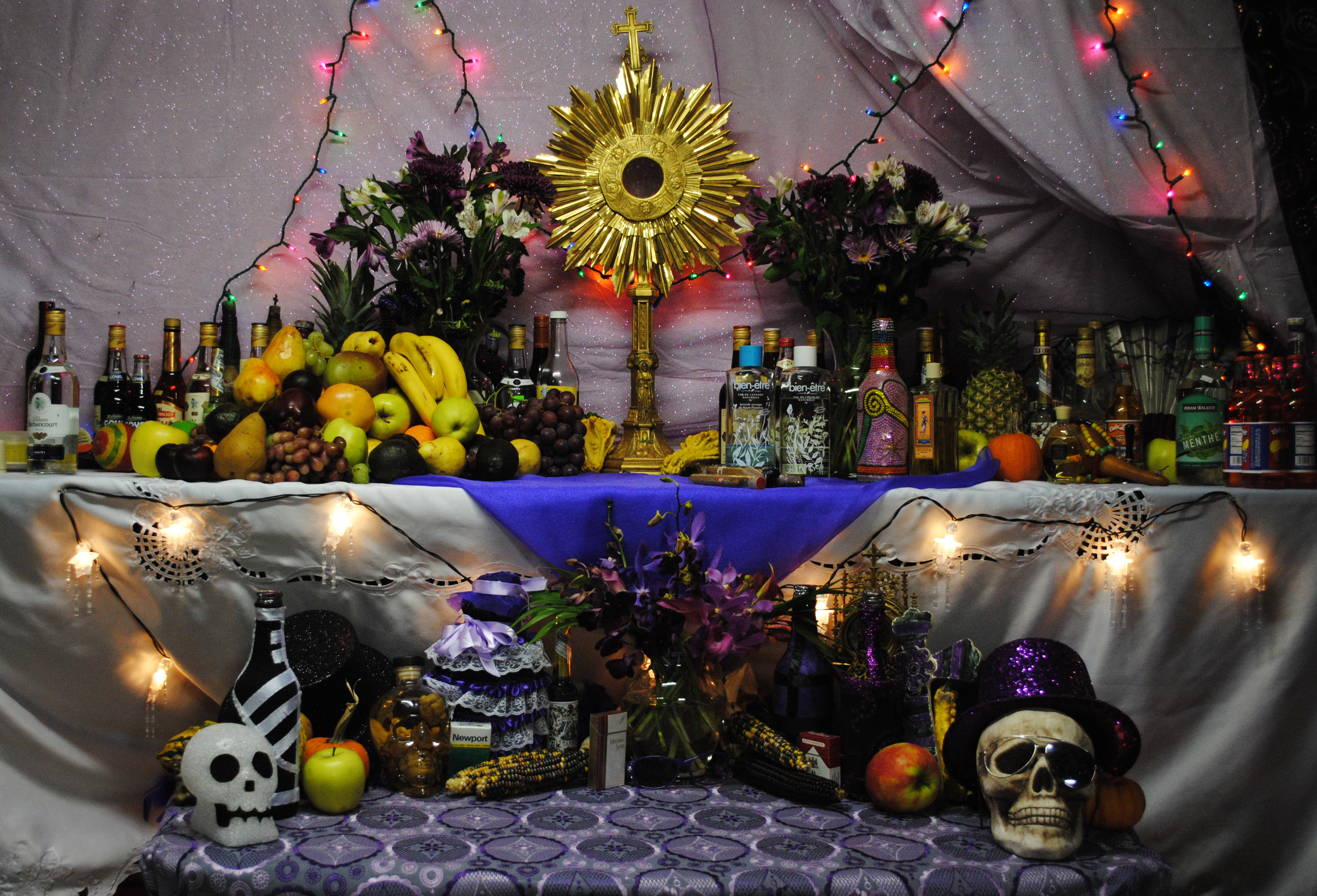
Haitian Vodou altar created during a festival for the Guede spirits, Boston, MA. Top right area is offerings to Rada spirits; top left to Petwo spirits; bottom to Gede.

The Petwo (Haitian Creole: Petwo), also spelled Petro (Note: Scholars who have used the spelling "petro" include Leslie Desmangles (1992). More recent sources using the spelling "petwo" include those of the anthropologist Karen McCarthy Brown (1991), and the historian Kate Ramsey (2011).) and alternatively known as dompete, are a family of lwa (loa) spirits in the religion of Haitian Vodou. They are regarded as being volatile and "hot", in this contrasting with the Rada lwa, which are regarded as sweet-tempered and "cool."

== Description ==
The Petwo are also known as the Dompete. They are considered one of the nanchons ('nations') of lwa spirits in the religion. Various commentators have described the Petwo as a "pantheon" of deities. Along with the Rada, they are one of the two main groups of lwa worshipped by practitioners in Port-au-Prince.

The Petwo spirits are considered to be volatile and hot-tempered, exhibiting bitter, aggressive, and forceful characteristics. In this they contrast with the Rada lwa, who are deemed sweet-natured and dependable. The Petwo lwa are kept separate from the Rada lwa, both spatially, by placing their altars in different parts of the ounfo (temple), and temporally, by invoking them at different stages in a ritual. The anthropologist Karen McCarthy Brown suggested that the contrast between the Rada and the Petwo reflected that between "two archetypal social groups", namely family members and foreigners or insiders and outsiders.

Due to their nature, Petwo lwa are treated carefully by Vodouists. They are deemed especially effective at getting things done, particularly when it comes to matters linked to money.

A common offering to the Petwo lwa is rum that has been mixed with coffee, spicy pepper, blood, and gunpowder. The drum rhythms selected for Petwo rites are typified by their rapid and harsh sound. Also involved in Petwo rites are small explosions of gunpowder, cracking whips, and shrieking police whistles.

== History ==
Desmangles thought that the Petwo lwa were not deities brought to the Caribbean by enslaved Africans but rather emerged on the island of Hispaniola amid the conditions of slavery. Later research instead suggested that they derived from the spirit pantheons of the Kongo people of West Central Africa.

As spirits associated with anger and rage, they came to be linked to the Haitian Revolution. The mythology of the Petwo lwas is a uniquely Dominican-Haitian phenomenon, not something inherited from Africa.

== Examples ==
Ezili Dantò is a Petwo lwa.

Ogun is a lwa who does not fit neatly into either the Petwo or Rada nanchon. Although he carries weaponry, which is associated with the Petwo, he is seen as the defender of Rada values.

== See also ==
- Rada loa
- Paquet congo
