= Ayida Wedo =

Rainbow serpent loa

- rainbows, snakes; water, benevolence (fertility, wealth)
- Veve of Ayida Wedo and Damballa, always depicted together. (Note: Compare the veve of the dual deities drawn on ground, Port-au-Prince, 20th century, printed by Thompson (1984) Cf. also the illustration labeled "Dam-balah" in. Owusu (2002))
- Other names: Rainbow Serpent
- Venerated in: Vodou, Folk Catholicism
- Attributes: rainbow, white color

Equivalents
- Yoruba: Oshumare
- Kongo: Mbumba Luangu
- Zulu: umnyama

Ayida Wedo, (Note: "Dambala Wèdo and Ayida Wèdo") Aida Wedo (also known as Aida Hwedo, Ayida-Weddo, Aido Quedo, Ayida, Agida) is a powerful loa spirit in Haitian vodoo, revered in regions across Africa (including the former Dahomey kingdom/Benin,Togo and Southeastern Ghana) and the Caribbean, a part of the African diaspora religions.

Ayida has Danbala (Damballa, Damballah, "(Papa) Dambala",) as her male counterpart and sometimes the two divinities have been construed as a married couple, (Note: "Dambala Ouedo, la force et la bonté. Lui et sa femme, Aida Oueddo".) (Note: "Danbala Wèdo... his wife, Ayida Wedo".) (Note: "Aiyda Wedo is depicted infrequently without Damballah, her consort".) (Note: "Damballah and his consort, Ayida Wedo") (Note: A source claims Erzulie Freda to be Damballa's concubine on the side, but no such explanation is given elsewhere.) but it is often seen as a dual spirit with both male and female aspects (Note: "two aspects") (Note: "Aida Hwedo.. is both female and male..") (Note: "dyad of female and male".) (Note: "not as couple, but as one entity".) The dual god may be collectively called Damballa-Ayida suggestive of both genders combined (Note: "merged into Damballa-Ayida".) (cf. § Dual spirit names below). The twain are regarded among the most ancient (Note: "ancient, benevolent father".) (Note: "Early original god".) and significant loa. (Note: "Danbala Wèdo, one of he most important and popular.. of the vodou pantheon".)

== General description ==
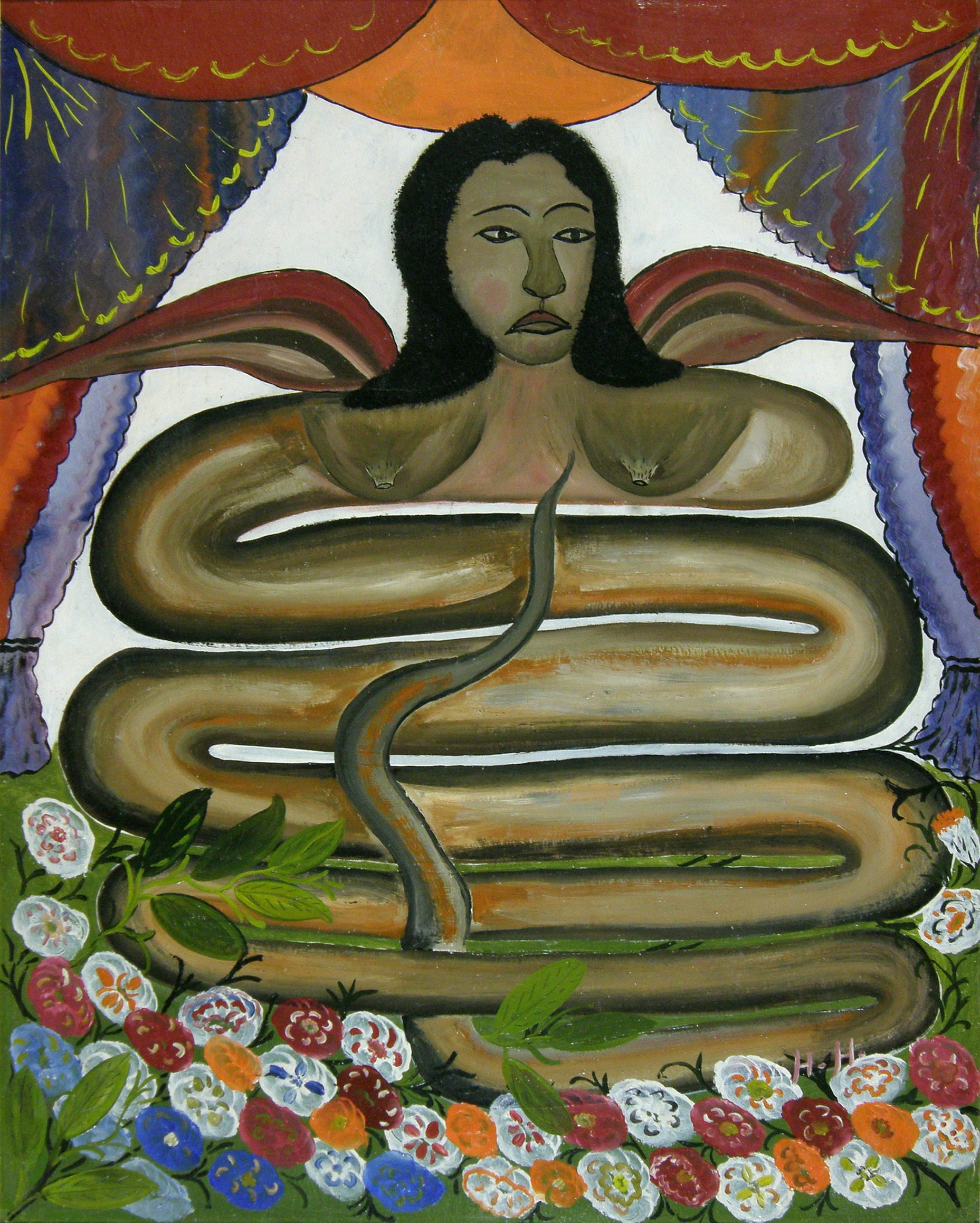
Damballah La Flambeau (c. 1945–48) ―Painting by Hector Hyppolite

Also known as a "Rainbow Serpent", they are at once a rainbow and a serpent god, (Note: Cf. also Anderson) (Note: As in "identified with the rainbow and is symbolized as a snake", various writers speak of symbolism rather than straightforward attribution. The lwa is depicted as serpent in veve line art, and other instances of § Iconography.) and associated (especially) with water, as she is said to reside in springs and rivers, or sharing the abode with Dambala at the waterfall of Saut-d'Eau (Note: Waterfall called Sodo/Saut-d’Eau, near Ville-Bonheur, Haiti.) She is more broadly associated with other of the four elements: air/wind, fire, and earth). Connection is also made to thunder or thunderbolt (Note: ".. in Benin Dã Ayidohwedo is intimately connected to the thunderbolt".)/lightning. The deity is also tied to wisdom. and fertility (cf. benevolent force, below).

In a more cosmic mythical context, the deities are thought to have existed before the Earth, Ayida Wedo assisted the creator goddess Mawu-Lisa in the formation of the world, (cf. § Creation myth) and is responsible for holding together the Earth and heavens (cf. § World-bearing animal myth) .

Danballa is further described as a "life force" over the "cycle of life and death" or "source of all that is dynamic" that resists the forces of "stagnation and death".

Ayida Wedo is a benevolent force, as is Dambala. (Note: "Generosity is Danbala's main trait".) (Note: In the vodou scheme, benevolent lwa is regarded as Rada (var. arada), malevolent ones as Petwo.) They are thus believed to bestow material wealth upon the faithful, or those who manage to capture the rainbow spirit (see § Treasure-jewel myth which elaborates on this). It is prescribed that Damballa be provided offerings of white food (milk, eggs, etc.), usually on Thursday, (Cf. § Color symbols, service, and offerings for further details). Ayida Wedo also bestows love to her followers and "teaches integration of the mind, body, and spirit".

One source describes the presence of a Petwo/Petro lwa "avatar" called "Damballa la Flambeau" (cf. image right). The babalawo chant associates this being with "fire down below", and Dorsey observes parallel with the kundalini serpent of Hinduism.

Ayida Wedo is syncretized in Haitian Vodou with the Catholic figure of Our Lady of Immaculate Conception for her association with serpents and rainbow-colored cherubs. Likesise, conflation has occurred between Danballa and the Irish Catholic Saint Patrick, (Note: Alcide Saint-Lot (2003), caption to Fig. 4.19) famed for driving out snakes.

== Nomenclature ==
As for the African roots, the Haitian loa (lwa) Ayida Wedo was originally the West African vodun Aida Wedo (Aido Hwedo, (Note: Hazel citing Merlo & Vidaud (1966b).) Ayido Hwedo, (Note: Thompson (1984), p. 176, quoted by Hoover.)) of the Fon people of Benin (or formerly Dahomey).

Around Wydah (Ouidah) and Porto-Novo in the south edge of Benin, the name was transcribed as Aydo-whe-do by Burton (Note: Ellis (1890), p. 48 referencing Burton) and Aïdo-wedo or Aïdo-Khouédo by French missionaries.

The snake is known to the Ewe people (of nearby southern Togo and Southeastern Ghana, speaking a related language) as Anyi-ewo or Anyiewo (Ewe: Anyi-eẃo, anyieẃo). Regionally, Anyi-eẃe is used among the western Ewe; Aida Wedo among the eastern Ewe). (Cf. § Weather myth and § Snake messenger lore for a piece of Ewe folk belief).

=== Etymology ===
The term Aida Wedo is perhaps a corruption of Aïdó-ewo-dò (in the Ewe language), composed of aï /anyi ('earth', or 'under-part'), dó ('edge'), ewo ('large snake'), and dò ('large'), which together combined means "The great snake of the under-edge/earth's edge". (Note: Also given more or less the same as "Grosse Schlange (ewo) eine grosse Schlange) der Unterwelt (anji = Untere Teil oder Unterwelt)" (in German) as given by Frobenius, who is dependent on Ellis as source.)

Or, the first half of Ayida Wedo denotes a terrestrial connection, while the latter half hints at the sky, (Note: Merlo & Vidaud (1966b), p. 312 apud Hazel.) or more precisely, we (houé) being the "sun". (Note: Merlo & Vidaud (1966a), p. 76 also cited by Hazel.)).

The deity is broadly referred to as dañhdañh (danh) in West Africa (including Dahomey), but dañh (eastern Ewe) or dà (western Ewe) means any ordinary snake. The rainbow spirit may be referred to simply as "Dan" by some of the Fon people.

It has also been suggested that the "da" (in "Damballa") might signify "life essence", "life force" or fecundity. (Note: Deren (1953), p. 113 apud Morris.)

The latter part of "Danbala" perhaps derives from "Allada (Ardra)", name of a Dahomey kingdom.

=== Dual spirit names ===
Other names reflecting the nature of the twin spirit are Dan Ayido Hwedo, Dan Aida Wedo (also Dã Aido Wedo, (Note: "Dã" approximates shorthand for "Dan" in Herskovits (1937); the transcription "Dą" is used by Herskovits (1938) for the Dahomey vodᶙ (vodun) and counter part of Aido Wedo.) Dambala-Wedo may be used to refer to the dual spirit, rather than Damballa Wedo for just the husband).

Another alternate spelling Dan-Akidôhouêdo was given by Julien Alapini.

== Color symbols, service, and offerings ==
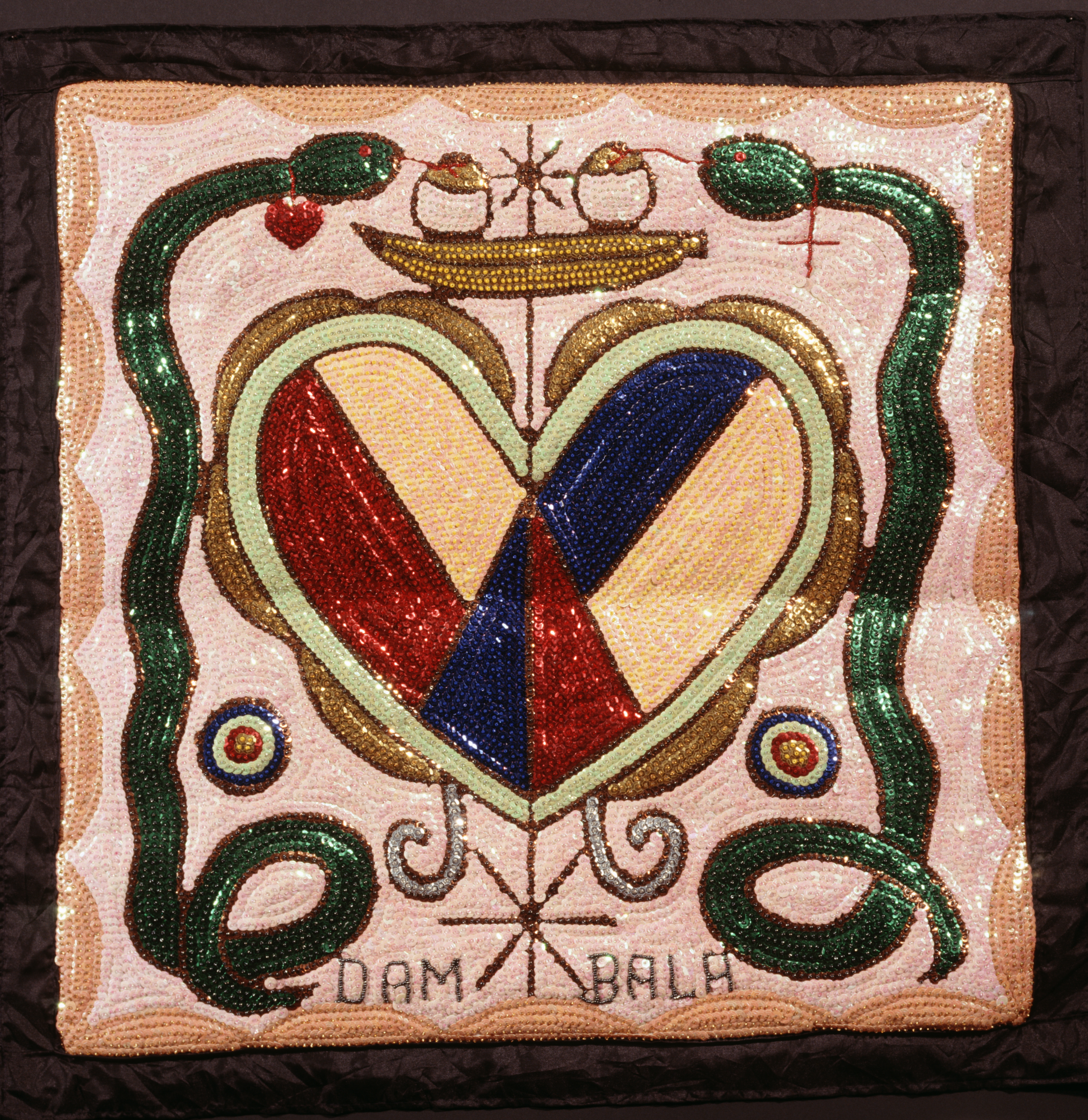
Dambala flag from Haiti —Collection of Africa Museum, Netherlands

Both Damballa and Ayida Wedo are associated with white color. Damballa is connected to white, representing his purity. Ayida Wedo is associated with blue and white, the colors of the sky and cloud. (Note: Additional colors come into play: the rainbow serpent had a twin personality whose red half was male, and whose blue half was female.) Appropriate offerings to her include white chickens, white eggs, rice, milk, etc., decorated in rainbow colors. Damballa is likewise offerings of white cake and liquor of white color.

Ayida Wedo's day is Thursday, or rather perhaps Damballa's service day is Thursday while Ayida Wedo's days of service lie on Monday and Tuesday, and she is honored on December 8 with festivals for her blessings. Through prayer and ritual, she grants peace, love, prosperity, joy, and understanding to her devotees.

The medium of the Ayida Wedo during a spirit possession ritual dons white cloth and a jeweled headdress, and embodies the serpent by slithering upon the ground.

Haitian Vodou employs the veve symbol of the Ayida Wedo (she is portrayed alongside Damballa as one of two dancing or intertwined serpents, cf. image top) in its rites.

Danbala is one of the three major lwa depicted on the drapo sèvis (drapo servis, ceremonial embroidered flag, sewn with sequins or beads, cf. image right).

=== African traditions ===
A special piece of pottery is dedicated to the Anyi-eẃo by the Ewe people (as it is the general practice to make offerings of such pottery to various deities across the Slave Coast of West Africa). The piece is made with a crude model of a clay snake coiled around a shallow earthenware pot or a calabash, with small red feathers stuck on the snake to represent horns. This vessel is whitewashed and usually placed at the base of a silk-cotton tree (Ceiba pentandra (Note: The "silk-cotton tree" (Ceiba pentandra) is the tree which is the preferred dwelling place of Loco, the lwa of plants and vegetation.)). (Note: Commentary is made on the clan pots made by the Ewe people of Kpandu (Kpando, Ghana), that they usually exhibit the motif of "ladder of death", but also often feature a python coiled around, which might be an allusion to the "rainbow of death". The authors suggest pottery at Kpandu to be of possibly based on "Akan model".) It is also said that Ayida Wedo's favored plant is the silk tree or cotton tree (cotton plant).

=== 18th century rites ===
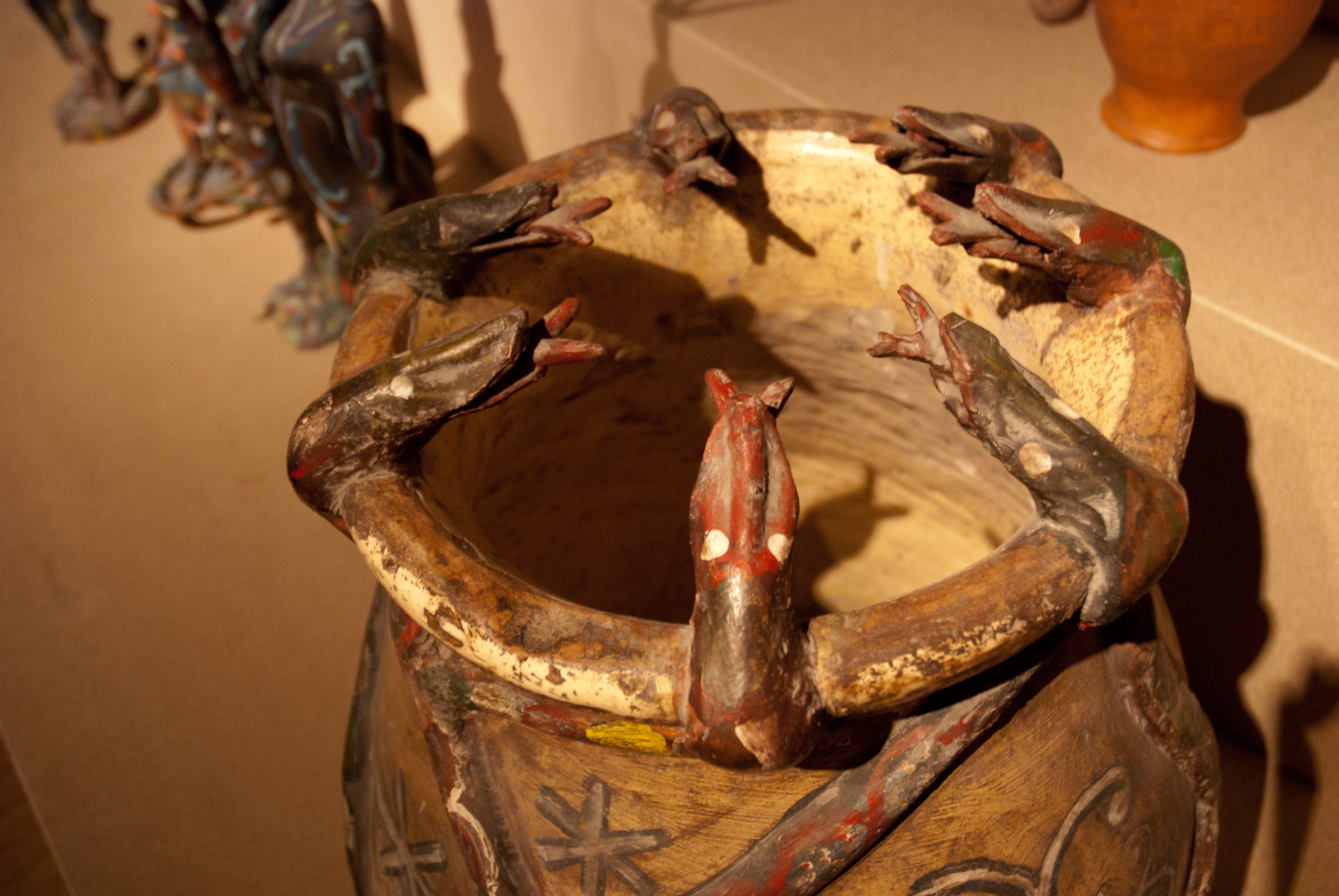
Earthenware pottery with snake decor, used in Haitian vodou. ―"Kunst und Kult aus Haiti" exhibit, Ethnological Museum of Berlin, 2010

According to 18th century descriptions given by Moreau de Saint-Méry of Haitian vodou ceremonies, snake cult practices involved the use of caged live snakes, presumably representing Damballa. An initiation ceremony was presided over by a "king and queen", and according to Moreau de Saint-Méry, an initiate to the cult received a packet containing herbs, hair, and other substances, which in today's terms would be called a paquet congo.

== Creation myth ==
The Fon people of Benin believe the rainbow serpent Ayida Wedo was a servant of Mawu-Lisa (Mawu/Mahu the moon goddess, Lisa the male sun god) and existed before the Earth was made. (Note: In some stories, Ayida Wedo descends from the heavens with Adanhu and Yewa, the first humans created by Mawu.) As Mawu-Lisa created the world, the serpent carried the goddess in its mouth as she shaped the Earth with her creations. As they went across the land, the rainbow serpent's body left behind the canyons, rivers, valleys, and mountains. It is also said that wherever the Ayida Wedo/Hwedo spent the night, a mountain formed out of its excrement, hence dã mi ("serpent dung") has become a term for minerals and stones mined from underground.

Another version explains that during creation, "a divine snake coiled itself round the earth to bring it together... and gave men a place in which to live" (Note: Parrinder (1968), latter also quoted by Hazel.) The coils holds terra firma in place, by binding the soil together and not allowing it to crumble off. "It is said that there are 3,500 snake coils above the and 3,500 below". Of the 7000 coils it is also said:

"In the beginning there was a vast serpent, whose body formed seven thousand coils beneath the earth, protecting it from descent into the abysmal sea. Then the titanic snake began to move and heave its massive form from the earth to envelop the sky. It scattered stars in the firmament and wound its taut flesh down the mountains to create riverbeds. It shot thunderbolts to the earth to create the sacred thunderstones. From its deepest core it released the sacred waters to fill the earth with life. As the first rains fell, a rainbow encompassed the sky and Danbala took her, Ayida Wedo, as his wife. The spiritual nectar that they created reproduces through all men and women as milk and semen. The serpent and the rainbow taught humankind the link between blood and life, between menstruation and birth, and the ultimate Vodou sacrament of blood sacrifice".

In Haiti, Ayida Wedo is said to have crossed the ocean with her husband Damballa to take the ancient knowledge and traditions of Vodou from Africa to the Caribbean. As Damballa slithered under the ocean, Ayida Wedo flew across the sky in the form of the rainbow until the two loa reunited in Haiti, bringing Vodou to the Americas.

=== World-bearing animal myth ===
As noted the above quote, (Note: "In the beginning..a vast serpent.. formed.. coils beneath the earth, protecting it", etc.,) it is clear that a part of the creation myth describes "Damballah holding the universe together", and some parallels to this are seen with Ancient Egyptian myth. The dual deities together held up the Earth and the heavens. Asked by Mawu-Lisa to help support the weight of her creations on the Earth, the rainbow serpent's male half coiled its body underneath the world to prevent its collapse. But whenever it writhes from exertion under the world's weight (or stirs only slightly from feeling uncomfortable), the serpent causes earthquakes in the land.

There is a more elaborate version of this myth by the Fon people where the Ayida Wedo acted as a sort of World Serpent propping up the sky; it set up pillars in the four cardinal direction to support the firmament, but also twisted itself around the pillars (and hence around the earth (Note: "the coils made by Dã around the earth are not stationary 'Dã Ayido Hwedo revolves round the earth'", requoted by Van der Slujs & Peratt (2009).)) in tri-colored braid (of black, white, and red).

It is also stated that Ayida Wedo's rainbow body encircling the earth and seas secures the link between Heaven and earth. Likewise, the Haitians say that Dambala and Ayida Wedo secure a link between thunder (sky) and the sea. Or, it is said, the female half was said to arc thunderbolts and rainbows across the sky with its body, and lived among the clouds, trees, springs, and rivers.

=== Eschatology ===
According to Dahomey eschatological myth, the serpent Aido Hwedo feeds on iron bars which the Creator instructed red monkeys from the sea to forge, but when this ore runs out, serpent will devour its own tail (cf. ouroboros motif under § Iconography); when this happens, it will ultimately cause the Earth, overburdened with the exploded human population, to "slip into the sea". (Note: Cf. fig. of a photograph of clay figurine ring depicting a tail-devouring serpent, with caption explaining the doomsday scenario.)

=== Weather myth ===
It is said that the Anyi-eẃo of the Ewe people only appears when it becomes thirsty, and while resting its tail on the earth, it rears its head into the sky above the clouds where the Mawu deity keep store of water, and devour the water. The spilled moisture during this guzzling turns into rainfall. Another version asserts that the Anyi-ewo of the Ewe, "when thirsty, comes forth from the sea, stands on its tail at one side of the earth, and bends its head over to drink at the other side". (Note: Voegelin (EWV)'s portion of "Rainbow" Leach ed. (1950), Funk and Wagnalls Dict. of Folklore.) Yet a third version explains that the true physical Anyi-eẃo resides in earthen mounds deep in the forest, but emerges in order to graze on grass, or to drink water in the clouds. The rainbow that appears in the clouds is the serpent's reflection, as the missionary explains it. (Note: Schlegel, Johann Bernhard (1858) apud Spieth.) (Note: Werner, Myth. of All Races 7: , citing Spieth.) (Note: anyieẃo is the spelling in Schlegel's lexicon (1857), also used here by Spieth.) But the native myth is that when the Anyi-eẃo emerges, its soul first ascends to high heaven (to frolic with mighty celestial spirits) but eventually descends into the clouds, and then is seen as a rainbow. The intelligence gathered from the hunters (of the Ho tribe of the Ewe) is that the snake burrows inside termite mounds, and as the snake was believed to devour humans, the hunters feared the snake as well as the mounds. (Note: Werner also, though she gives "anthills".)

Occurrences of double rainbow will prompt a native to say that the rainbow serpent has descended with his consort (wife).

Some source suggest the Dambala Wedo (or Aido Hwedo) is blamed for causing floods.

=== Treasure-jewel myth ===
There is a notion among the Ewe people that the Anyi-eẃo excretes popo beads (called aggry beads in Ghana) as droppings, and somehow by eating grains of maize, converts them to jewelry. (Note: Cf. Burton.) These beads are explained as items whose manufacturing methods are now lost, so must be excavated. A somewhat differing version of the myth is that precious "pearls" (such as unearthed in the city of Weda, i.e. Ouidah) are believed hidden inside the Anyi-eẃo, and if someone with the wisdom to hunt it shoots it down while it "fares merrily along", (Note: German: Lustfahrt) then the person may be able to retrieve the "pearls" from the snake's decomposing cadaver. Yet another telling is that whoever finds the spot where the rainbow touches the earth will discover a cache of the beads. (Note: Werner (source unclear) Cf. Dahse (1911), p. 44: "Man erzählt sich in Atakpame, dass die schönen blauen Perlen, die man in der Erde fände, die Exkremente der Regenbogenschlange seien, die zur Erde fallen, wenn die Regenbogenschlange sich zum Himmel aufbäumt (In Atakpame, the story goes that the beautiful blue beads found in the ground are the excrement of the rainbow serpent, falling to earth when the serpent rears up toward the sky)".)}

A plausible explanation was given by Alexander Merensky that when hoards of the beads are discovered buried in earth, all strung up together, they could resemble the vertebrae remains of a huge dead snake.

== Folklore ==
=== Snake messenger lore ===
A certain smaller species of boa (called Wo) may be regarded as a messenger of the Anyi-eẃo by the Ewe people; an individual snake designated as such a messenger has its lair scattered about with palm-leaves, to indicate the sanctity of the snake and warning it must remain unharmed. (Note: A girdle of palm-tree around certain trees marks it to be sacred and not to be cut down.)

Similar lore is found among the Fon people, where the dangbé (not the deity Dangbé but the common species Python regius is regarded as the emissary of the rainbow serpent Aidohouèdo, while the Oshumare of the Yoruba (cf. § Parallels) commissions the large python Eré as it envoy.

== Iconography ==
In religious art and veves, the Ayida Wedo and Danbala Wedo are commonly represented as a pair of snakes intertwined around each other.

Also the vodun symbol for Damballah is the circular serpent devouring its own tail (commonly called ouroboros). The snake is depicted with this tail-swallowing serpent consuming its own tail in various works of art and craft, e.g., appliqué work, for example. (Note: Luomala (KL)'s portion of "Rainbow" Leach ed. (1950), Funk and Wagnalls Dict. of Folklore) The motif has also been found on altars venerating Ayida Wedo dating from the Dahomey kingdom period. (Note: Merlo & Vidaud (1966b), pp. 302, 304, 306 apud Hazel.) Temples to the Anyi-eẃo built by the (western) Ewe people are painted with rainbow-colored stripes, also featuring a rude drawing of a snake in the midst of the prismatic colours. A bas-relief depicts the serpent catching its own tail at a Dahomey palace. (Note: Bay (1985), p. 19 apud Roberts)

The Fon still paint the rainbow serpent, sometimes depicted with a serpent's head and a "pot of gold at the base of his tail, a sign of the wealth he can bring".

== Parallels ==
In West African mythology, Ayida Wedo is often equated to the Yoruba rainbow serpent Oshumare, with whom she shares many aspects. (Note: Bay (1985), p. 18 apud Roberts) (Note: "Oshumare, the [Yoruba] rainbow-god is identical with Anyi-Ewo [of the Ewe people]") The aspect of the serpent devouring its own tail is also seen in the Oshumare. Just as the rainbow seems to span heaven and earth, both the Ayida Wedo and the Oshmare are considered to embody an umbilical connection between living humans/terrestrial and motherhood/procreation/ancestral world/primordial creation of the world. (Note: Bay (1985), p. 18 cited by Roberts, who writes: "a horned snake called Dan Aido-huedo by Fon-speakers and Oshumare by Yoruba is believed to produce the rainbow and is associated with continuity [with] ancestors [and] procreation.. umbilicus.. to one's mother [and] creation of the world".)

As to the of myth of the drinking rainbow among the Ewe people (§ Weather myth), The Zulu people have a similar notion that the rainbow is a snake (i.e., a rainbow serpent called umnyama), and when they touch the earth they have come to drink water.

The Aida-Wedo and Danbala may have been a borrowing of the concept of the rainbow serpent named ndamba as held in belief by the Kongo people of West Central Africa, or so Wyatt MacGaffey and Robert Farris Thompson have hypothesized. The ndamba is characterized by their male and female mating by coiling themselves interweavingly around a palm tree. At the least, one can establish there is a parallel between this ndamba and the Danbala deity. (Note: Thompson (1984), also cited by Hoover)

In Suriname's native Winti religion, there are many numbers of snake deities (cf. Snake worship § Suriname) recognized as gods (wɩnti or winti), but Hei̯-grɔ̨ is the one in particular corresponding to Ayida Hwedo. The Hei̯-grɔ̨, which lurks in mountainous terrain, is believed to result when a Yɔrka ("spirit of the dead") enters the Aboma ("boa constrictor") and starts catching human beings. (Note: Cf. the termite mound-dwelling maneater myth under § Weather myth.) The Dahomey Ayida Hwedo is also known to dwell and the mountains and believed to be "a manifestation of the spirit of an ancient ancestor", justifying this identification.

== See also ==
- Rainbow serpent (Africa) — of various groups in Africa and Caribbean
- Rainbow Serpent – Creator god and common motif of Aboriginal Australia
- Oshumare — Yoruba parallel
- Inkanyamba — tornado serpent of African popular belief
