= Julien Alapini =

Beninese teacher and playwright

Personal details
- Born: 28 August 1906 Abomey-Calavi, French Dahomey
- Died: 26 February 1970 (aged 63)
- Occupation: Teacher, writer, playwright, ethnographer, politician

Julien Alapini (28 August 1906 in Abomey-Calavi – 26 February 1970) was a teacher, writer, playwright, ethnographer, and politician from French Dahomey (now the Republic of Benin).

He attended primary school in Ouidah and then the École normale William-Ponty in Gorée (Senegal) from 1926 to 1929.

After graduating, he was appointed a teacher and later a school principal in several locations: Porto-Novo, Kouandé, Djougou, Savalou, Cotonou, Allada, Abomey, Covè, Parakou, Kouti, and Tori-Gare.

In parallel, he conducted ethnographic and linguistic research on Dahomey, approaching it as a Christian and admirer of French culture. Through two essays, Les noix sacrées. Étude complète de Fa-Ahidégoun, génie de la sagesse et de la divination au Dahomey (1950) and Les Initiés (1953), he aimed to continue the work of colonial ethnologists: to better understand the colonized to better govern them. As a devout Catholic, he denounced superstitions and fetishism, particularly the methods of divination such as the consultation of Fa.

Like other Dahomean authors, such as Maximilien Quénum, his work shows an "interpenetration of ethnology and literature." He studied entertainment, oral literature, songs, proverbs, and riddles and produced his own tales and plays.

In 1960, he was appointed Inspector of Education, then Minister of Education of Dahomey from 1962 to 1964. Retired in 1967, he died on 26 February 1970.

== Selected publications ==
- "Note sur les Tam-tam dahoméens", L'Éducation africaine, n°101, 1938, pp. 50–56.
- "Notes sur les chansons dahoméennes", L'Éducation africaine, n°102-103, 1939, pp. 25–31.
- Contes dahoméens, Paris-Avignon, Les Livres Nouveaux, 1941, 135 p.
- Légendes dahoméennes, Namur, Éd. Grands lac, 1942.
- Les Noix sacrées : Étude complète de Fa-Ahidégoun, génie de la sagesse et de la divination au Dahomey, Monte Carlo, Regain, 1950, 126 p.
- Le Petit dahoméen - grammaire, vocabulaire, lexique en langue du Dahomey, Avignon, Les Presses universelles, 1950, 285 p.
- Les Initiés, Avignon, édition Aubanel, 1953, 252 p.
- "L'éducation africaine traditionnelle du Dahomey", L'Éducation africaine, n°38, 1956, pp. 51–61.
- Les Dahoméens et les Togolais au centenaire des apparitions, Avignon, Aubanel, 1959, 165 p.
- Acteurs noirs, Avignon, Les Presses universelles, 1965, 189 p. (theater)
