= Snake worship =

Devotion to serpent deities

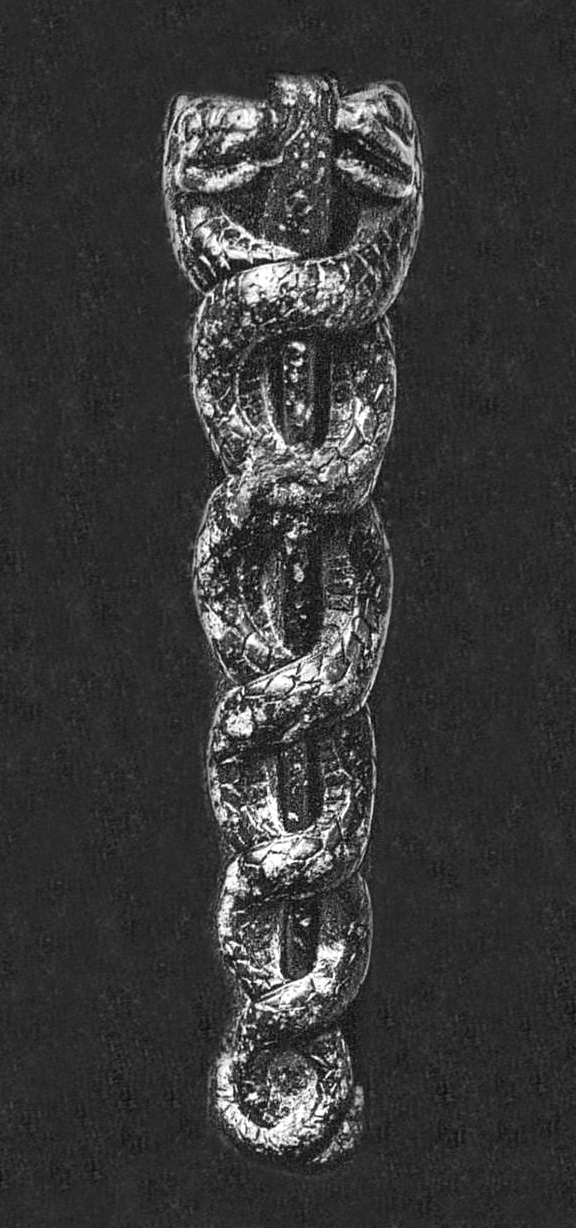
The Caduceus, symbol of God Ningishzida, on the libation vase of Sumerian ruler Gudea, circa 2100 BCE.

Ophiolatry (snake worship) refers to veneration and religious devotion to serpent deities, a tradition documented in many religions and mythologies worldwide. In many traditional religions and mythologies, snakes have been symbolically associated with concepts such as wisdom, cyclical renewal, and protection, although meanings vary significantly between cultures.

== Near East ==
=== Ancient Mesopotamia ===
Some ancient Mesopotamian and Semitic texts depict snakes as symbols of renewal, possibly linked to their periodic shedding of skin, which ancient authors connected with longevity. The Sumerians worshiped a serpent god named Ningishzida. Before Israelite culture, snake cults were well-established in Canaan in the Bronze Age. Archaeologists have uncovered serpent cult objects in Bronze Age strata at several pre-Israelite cities in Canaan: two at Megiddo, one at Gezer, one in the sanctum sanctorum of the Area H temple at Hazor, and two at Shechem.

Serpent cult objects also existed in other cultures of the surrounding region. A late Bronze Age Hittite shrine in northern Syria contained a bronze statue of a god holding a serpent in one hand and a staff in the other. In sixth-century Babylon, a pair of bronze serpents flanked each of the four doorways of the temple of Esagila. At the Babylonian New Year's festival, the priest was to commission two images from a woodworker, a metalworker, and a goldsmith, one of which "shall hold in its left hand a snake of cedar, raising its right [hand] to the god Nabu". At the tell of Tepe Gawra, at least seventeen Early Bronze Age Assyrian bronze serpents were recovered.

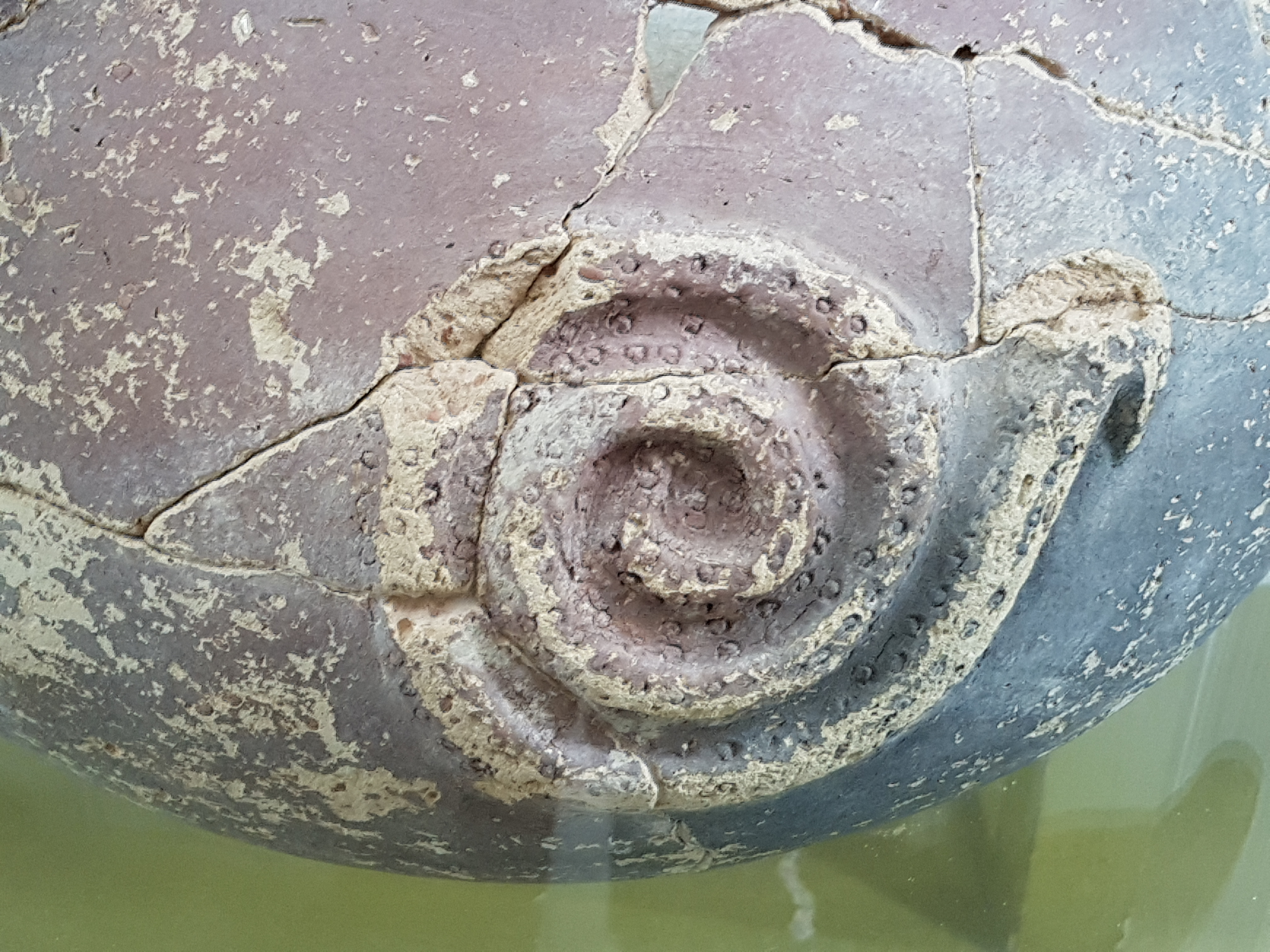
Snake motif on Bronze Age pottery from Rumailah, Al Ain.

=== Archeological finds in the United Arab Emirates ===
Significant pottery, bronze-ware, and even gold depictions of snakes have been found throughout the United Arab Emirates (UAE). The Bronze Age and Iron Age metallurgical center of Saruq Al Hadid has yielded probably the richest trove of such objects, although much has been found bearing snake symbols in Bronze Age sites at Rumailah, Bithnah, and Masafi. Most of the depictions of snakes are similar, with a consistent dotted decoration applied to them.

Archaeologists have noted the widespread depiction of snakes in Bronze Age UAE sites, with some interpreting these symbols as evidence for snake-related cults, though definitive proof remains elusive.

=== Gnosticism ===
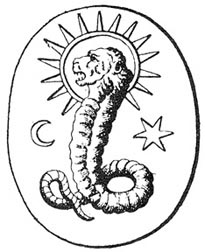
A lion-faced, serpentine deity found on a Gnostic gem in Bernard de Montfaucon's L'antiquité expliquée et représentée en figures may be a depiction of the Demiurge.

Gnosticism originated in the late 1st century CE in non-rabbinical Jewish and early Christian sects. In the formation of Christianity, various sectarian groups, labeled gnostics by their opponents, emphasized spiritual knowledge (gnosis) of the divine spark within over faith (Ancient Greek: πίστις, romanized: pistis) in the teachings and traditions of the various communities of Christians. Gnosticism presents a distinction between the highest, unknowable God, and the Demiurge, the "creator" of the material universe. Gnostic Christian doctrines rely on a dualistic cosmology comprising the evil Demiurge or creator god, a false god identified with the Hebrew God of the Old Testament, which they separated from the unknown God of the Gospel, the father of Jesus Christ and creator of the spiritual world, as the true, good God. In Gnosticism, the biblical serpent in the Garden of Eden was praised and thanked for bringing knowledge (gnosis) to Adam and Eve and thereby freeing them from the malevolent Demiurge's control.

However, not all Gnostic movements regarded the creator of the material universe as inherently evil or malevolent. For instance, Valentinians believed that the Demiurge is an ignorant and incompetent creator, trying to fashion the world as well as he can but lacking the proper power to maintain its goodness. They were regarded as heretics by the proto-orthodox Early Church Fathers.

== Africa ==
=== Dangbé ===
The Kingdom of Dahomey (in present-day Benin) was the location a cult dedicated to a serpent deity called Dàn or Dangbé (old spelling Danh-gbi) who was a benefactor-god of wisdom and bliss, "associated with trees and the ocean". This cult may have been of exotic origin, introduced to Dahomey around c. 1725 and originating from the Kingdom of Whydah, which Dahomey conquered at a roughly contemporary time.

At Whydah, the chief center, there was a serpent temple tenanted by some fifty snakes. The killing of a python, even by accident, was punishable by death, but in the 19th century, this was replaced with a fine. (Note: The perpetrator will be burnt alive, or buried alive if he was a native, and a European could be decapitated. Rather than a fine, one description is that there is a mock mob lynching, which the snake-killer could absolve by purifying himself in water by paying a suitable bribe.)

Dangbé has numerous wives, who, until 1857, took part in a public procession from which the profane crowd was excluded; those who peeked were to be put to death. A python was carried around the town in a hammock, perhaps as part of a ceremony dedicated to the expulsion of evils.

Dangbé is pronounced Dagowe by the Surinamese (cf. § Suriname below).

=== Rainbow serpents of Africa ===
The rainbow serpent (or rainbow snake) is a world-wide myth, including Africa. The rainbow snake was called the Aido Hwedo by the Dahomey (Fon people of present-day Benin), a sort of cosmic serpent that served as bridge between heaven and sky, and could cause earthquakes and floods. In West African mythology in general, Ayida Wedo (or together with the male counterpart Dan/Danballa, also called "Dan Ayido Hwedo", etc.), portrayed as a snake is believed to hold up the sky.

The normally unseen Anyi-eẃo of the Ewe people appears in order to graze on grass, or to drink water when thirsty, and with its tail fixed on the earth, reaches its head into the clouds (infringing on the heavenly territory of the Mawu deity) and drinks water, causing rain with the water it spills, or that it props itself on its tail in the sea, bends its head over, and drinks from the other side of the earth.

While the Aido-huedo ("Dan Aìdó-huedó", or just "Dan") is the rainbow serpent of the Fon people of Benin, its counterpart is called oshumare by the Yoruba people. (Note: "Oshumare, the [Yoruba] rainbow-god is identical with Anyi-Ewo [of the Ewe people]") The Ouroboros-like characteristic of the serpent swallowing its own tail is found in depictions of the Aido-huedo as well as the Oshumare.

The rainbow snake is also known as Anyi-eẃo (Note: Anyi-ewo) to the Ewe people of Togo and Ghana. His messenger was said to be a small variety of boa, and held sacred and inviolable by locals who adorn palm leaves around its lair. The rainbow Anyi-eẃo only appears when it becomes thirsty when it reaches into the sky (dominion of Mawu) and drinks water, spilling rain in the process.

The belief also exists among the Nupe people of Nigeria that the dúwa, the rainbow, is a giant snake. (Note: An informant claimed he came into possession of the snake's giant palm sized scale (which the authors' explanation of a boa, does not drop). There is also folklore that one in possession of the rainbow's dung amass wealth.) (Note: Crowther & Taylor (1859), pp. 193–194 apud Frobenius (1898b), p. 83, n13.)

Among the Kongo people Mbumba Luangu in their language signifies the rainbow serpent, the concept of rainbow doubling as a mythic serpent. The term ndamba (lit. 'sleep') also refers to the rainbow serpent among the Kongo, with emphasis on carnal love-making. (Note: Thompson (1984), pp. 177–178, n24, quoting/citing MacGaffey, private communication.) (Note: On the coast to the former Kingdom of Loango(now western part of the Republic of the Congo), Umchama-umwula (Assundidi) or Umschama (German transliteration).)

The AmaZulu (Zulu people) are said to share a similar belief as the Ewe people, believing the rainbow to be a serpent; when it seen touching the earth, tradition says it is in the act of drinking from a water pool. (Note: Ellis (1890), p. 48, cited by Frobenius (1898b), p. 83, n14.) Within the scope of the "rainbow serpent myth" of the Zulu, Leo Frobenius includes a piece of Zulu oral folktale where a being referred to as umnyama (Zulu term meaning "rainbow") (Note: Zulu: um-nyama "rainbow" (all colors) while Zulu: ubu-nyama "blackness, darkness" appears to be a related term.)) is understood to be a sheep-like creature, dwelling in a deep pool. If a man who aspires to become a diviner enters such a pool and succeeds, he will emerge from it besmirched with multi-colored clay and snakes coiled around him. (Note: Callaway (1868), cited, via Haarhoff (1890)Frobenius (1898b), p. 83, n14.) (Note: Anecdote from a Wanika Chief that a great serpent is seen emerging from the sea stretching up towards the heavens, often during heavy rains is given by as additional lore of rainbow serpent by Frobenius (1898b), p. 83, n14.) (Note: Vladimir Propp gives "umugarna" (apparently a misreading), citing Frobenius (1898b), p. 84.)

Similar lore is known to the Hausa people, where in their language, the rainbow is called masharua. Of its origin, it is said to emerge out of anthills (suri), spin like the whirlwind, bind the storms and stop the rain, according to tradition. That is to say, the moisture is drunk up by the spirit of the rainbow (gajimare, which also means "cloud"), so there is no raining when the rainbow appears accompanied by dark clouds. Other traditions say that gajimare dwells in the clouds, or in wells, pools, and rivers. It is of double sex, the male part being the red color of the rainbow, the female part blue.

==== African diasporic religion ====
In Haitian Vodou, the creator loa Damballa is represented as a serpent, and his wife Ayida Wedo is the rainbow serpent. Simbi are a type of serpentine loa in Haitian Vodou. They are associated with water and sometimes are believed to act as psychopomps serving Papa Legba. In a commonly chanted Haitian vodou hymn, there is invocation of "Eh! eh ! Bomba, hen! hen!" where Bomba according to one theory is the corruption of the aforementioned Mbumba Luangu of Congo. (Note: Note tha Mbumba alone does not signify snake, as commonly misconceived, but rather signifies any number of violent minkisi (nkisi).) Another theory explains Bomba as a corruption of aboma which means 'snake' in Fon and Surinamese Creole (Sranan Tongo).

Just as the vodun Aida Wedo of the Fon people was transplanted into the Haitian Iwa Damballa Aida Wedo, the Yoruba orisha Oshumare was adopted in Brazil as the orixa Oxumare.

While the Ashanti (Asante) people and the Akan people conceive of the rainbow (Akan: nyankontɔn) as literally "Nyanke-Nyankopon's bow, i.e., "Sky god's bow" rather than a rainbow serpent, scholars have concluded that this belief is connected to the cosmology of the Ewe people whose sky god is Mawu (and in turn, Mawu is the master of Ewe people's rainbow snake). (Note: Note that the Ewe are known to cross-culture with the Yoruba and the Akan-Ashanti of Ghana, there may not be a closely matching and clear parallel to the rainbow snake in pure Akan-Ashanti myth, which is explained hereafter.) (cf. Rainbows in mythology § Raibows as bow to be thrown for more details).

==== Example in art ====
Eva Meyerowitz wrote of an earthenware pot that was stored at the Museum of Achimota College in present-day Ghana. The base of the neck of this pot is surrounded by the rainbow snake. The legend of this creature explains that the rainbow snake only emerged from its home when it was thirsty. Keeping its tail on the ground, the snake would raise its head to the sky, looking for the rain god. As it drank great quantities of water, the snake would spill some, which would fall to the earth as rain.

There are four other snakes on the sides of this pot: Danh-gbi, the life-giving snake, Li, for protection, Liwui, which was associated with Wu, god of the sea, and Fa, the messenger of the gods. The first three snakes, Danh-gbi, Li, Liwui, were all worshiped at Whydah, Dahomey, where the serpent cult originated. For the Dahomeans, the spirit of the serpent was one to be feared, as he was unforgiving. They believed that the serpent spirit could manifest itself in any long, winding objects such as plant roots and animal nerves. They also believed it could manifest itself as the umbilical cord, making it a symbol of fertility and life.

=== Mami Wata ===
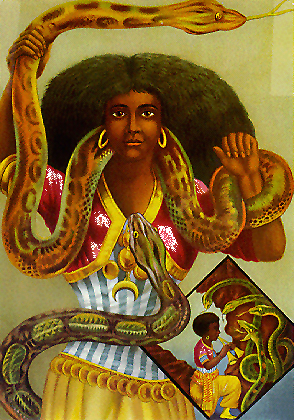
Mami Wata, who plays a major role in various African and African-American religions

Mami Wata is a water spirit or class of spirits associated with fertility and healing, usually depicted as a woman holding a large snake or with the lower body of a serpent or fish. She is worshiped in West, Central, and Southern Africa and the African diaspora.

=== Ancient Egypt ===
Ancient Egyptians worshiped snakes, especially the cobra. The cobra was not only associated with the sun god Ra, but also with many other deities such as Wadjet, Renenutet, Nehebkau, and Meretseger.

Serpents could also be evil and harmful, such as the case of Apep. The serpent goddess Meretseger is regarded ambivalently with both veneration and fear.

Charms against snakes were inscribed or chanted, sometimes even to protect the dead; (Note: In the Book of the Dead, Spell 39 "Get back! Crawl away! Get away from me, you snake! Go, be drowned in the Lake of the Abyss, at the place where your father commanded that the slaying of you should be carried out." The tombs of Unis, Teti and Seti I were inscribed with the charm, "Back with thee, hidden snake!", etc.) There are known charms against snakes that invoke the snake deity Nehebkau. (Note: Mundkur (1978), p. 129 apud Shorter (1935), p. 48 (Chester Beatty VIII B.^{1}), invoking Neḥebka 𓅐𓎛𓃀𓂓𓏤𓆙𓅍)

Wadjet, the patron goddess of Upper Egypt, was depicted either as a cobra with a flared hood or as a woman with a cobra's head. After the unification of Upper and Lower Egypt, she became one of the protective emblems adorning the pharaoh's crown. According to tradition, she was believed to "spit fire" at the enemies of both the pharaoh and the sun god Ra, who was sometimes referred to as one of the eyes of Ra. She was often associated with the lioness goddess Sekhmet, who also bore that role.

=== Social and family affiliations ===
In many parts of Africa, the serpent is looked upon as the incarnation of deceased relatives. Among the Amazulu, as among the Betsileo of Madagascar, certain species are assigned as the abode of certain classes. The Maasai, on the other hand, regard each species as the habitat of a particular family of the tribe.

== The Americas ==
=== North America ===
Indigenous peoples of the Americas, such as the Hopi, give reverence to the rattlesnake as grandfather and king of snakes who is able to give fair winds and cause tempests. Among the Hopi of Arizona, snake-handling figures largely in a dance to celebrate the union of Snake Youth (a Sky spirit) and Snake Girl (an Underworld spirit). The rattlesnake was worshiped in the Natchez temple of the sun.

=== Mesoamerica ===
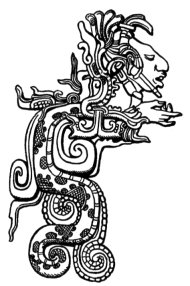
The classic Maya vision serpent, as depicted at Yaxchilan

The Maya deity Kukulkan and the Aztec Quetzalcoatl (both meaning "feathered serpent") figured prominently in their respective cultures of origin. Kukulkan (Q'uq'umatz in K'iche' Maya) is associated with Vision Serpent iconography in Maya art. Kukulkan was an official state deity of the Itza in the northern Yucatan.

The worship of Quetzalcoatl dates back as early as the 1st century BC at Teotihuacan. In the Postclassic period (AD 900–1519), the cult was centered at Cholula. Quetzalcoatl was associated with wind, the dawn, the planet Venus as the morning star, and was a tutelary patron of arts, crafts, merchants, and the priesthood.

=== South America ===
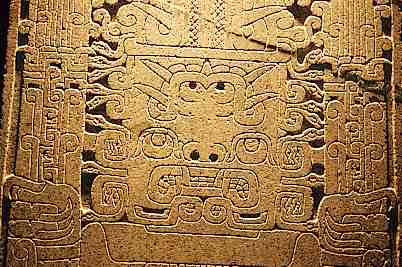
The Raimondi Stela from the Chavín culture, Ancash, Peru depicts a fanged and clawed figure with snakes for hair.

Serpents figure prominently in the art of the pre-Incan Chavín culture, as can be seen at the type-site of Chavín de Huántar in Peru. In Chile, the Mapuche mythology featured a serpent figure in stories about a deluge.

=== Suriname ===
In the Surinamese faith of Winti, there are numerous serpent divinities (or a profusion of names for them). Here, the generic deity is called wɩnti (winti, "wind, spirit, god"), compared to the Fon term vodų for "deity" (in Benin/ex-Dahomey), yet the cognate term vɔdų has come to mean more particularly "serpent deity" in general in the Saramacca District of Suriname.

Dagowe (Surinamese cognate to the § Dangbé of the Dahomey) is a significant snake deity in Suriname. When the Earth Goddess Grɔ̨ Mama is enraged, she manifests herself as the Dagowe or Aboma (python).

In fact, "there is no sharp distinction between the Earth deities and the Snake spirits". The roster of snake deities thus may have a proper place in the hierarchy next to the Sky-god and Earth goddess: they are the aforementioned Dagowe, the Papa (also called "Papa snake", or Papa gadu meaning "Papa god"), and Hei̯-grɔ̨ of surpassing strength, (equivalent to the Aido Hwedo of the Dahomey), the vɔdų ("generic serpent god") and Aboma ("python"), both aforementioned, also Alado, Sɩnero, Korowena, Kwɛnda, Tobochina, and Cheno.

It is said that the women's winti (in the sense of familiar god[?]) are often snake spirits; the Papa snake in particular only takes (spiritual) possession of women, unlike other snake spirits who may inhabit men or women.

== Asia ==
=== India ===
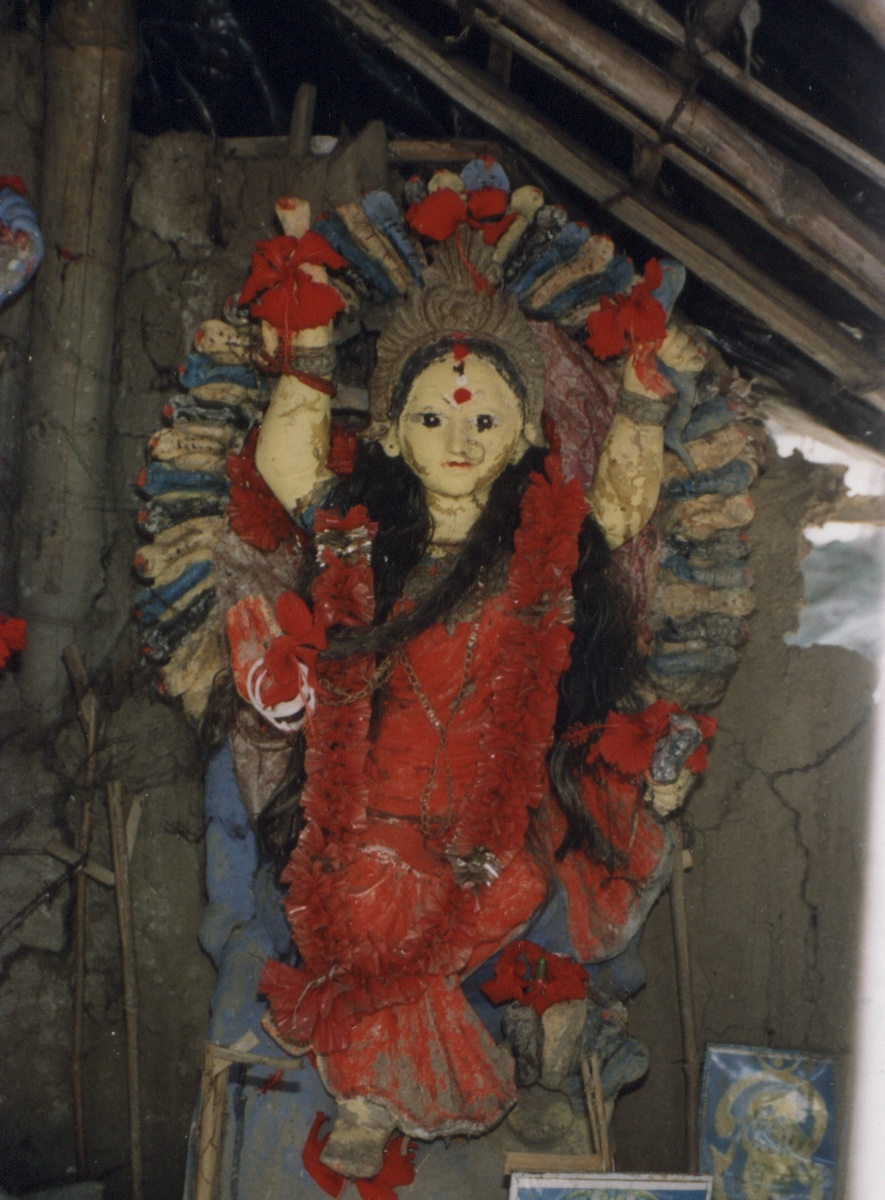
Manasa depicted in a village in the Sundarbans, West Bengal, India

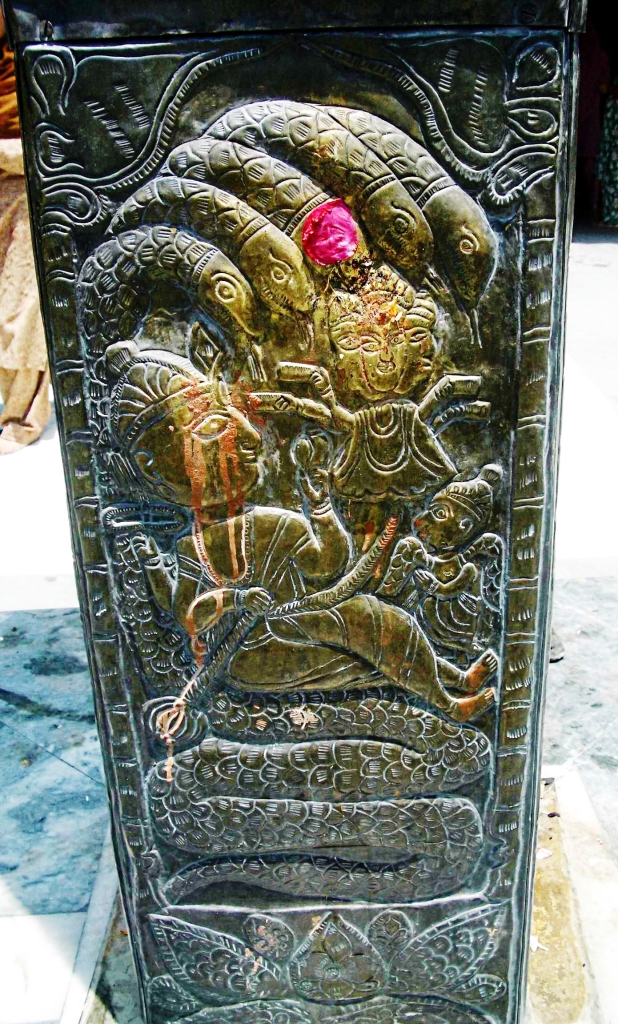
Vishnu resting on Shesha on a copper pillar in Kullu

A race of snake-like beings, termed nagas, is prominent in Hindu mythology. Nāga (Sanskrit: नाग) is the Sanskrit and Pāli word for a deity or class of entity or being, taking the form of a very large snake, found in Hinduism and Buddhism. The use of the term nāga is often ambiguous, as the word may also refer, in similar contexts, to one of several human tribes known as or nicknamed nāgas; to elephants; and to ordinary snakes, particularly the Ophiophagus hannah, the Ptyas mucosa and the Naja naja, the latter of which is still called nāg in Hindi and other languages of India. A female nāga is called a nāgīni. In many Indian religious traditions, serpents (nāgas) symbolize themes such as transformation and the cycle of life and death, with associated rituals varying widely by region and community. Over a large part of India, there are carved representations of cobras, nagas, or stones as substitutes. To these, human food and flowers are offered, and lights are burned before the shrines. Among some Indians, a cobra that is accidentally killed is burned like a human being; no one would kill one intentionally. The serpent-god's image is carried in an annual procession by a celibate priestess.

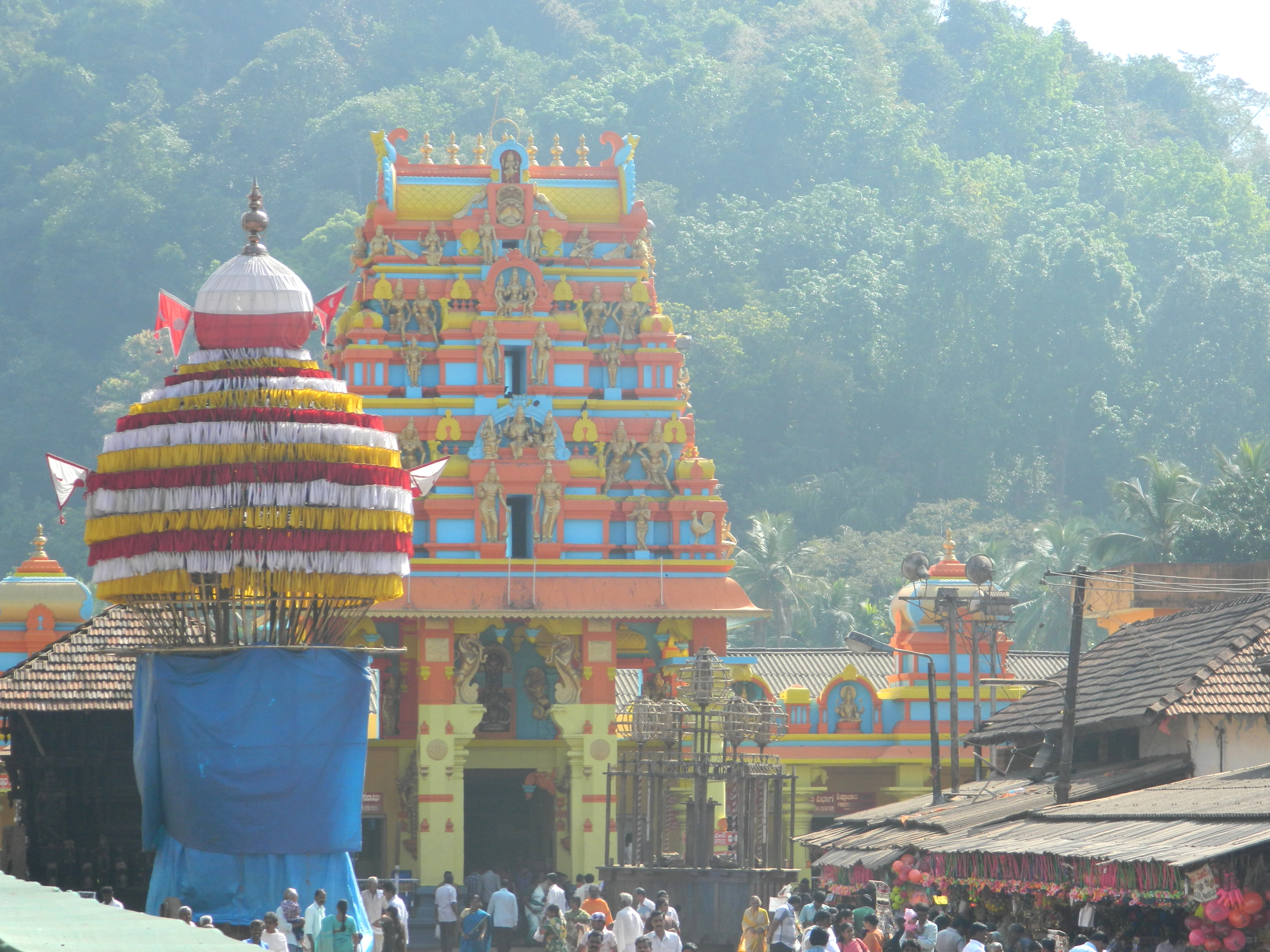
Naga Temple Kukke Subramanya Swamy temple, Karnataka

At one time, there were many different renditions of the serpent cult located in India.. In Northern India, a masculine version of the serpent named Rivaan, known as the "king of the serpents", was worshiped. Instead of the "king of the serpents", actual live snakes were worshiped in Southern India. The Manasa-cult in Bengal, India, however, was dedicated to the anthropomorphic serpent goddess, Manasa.

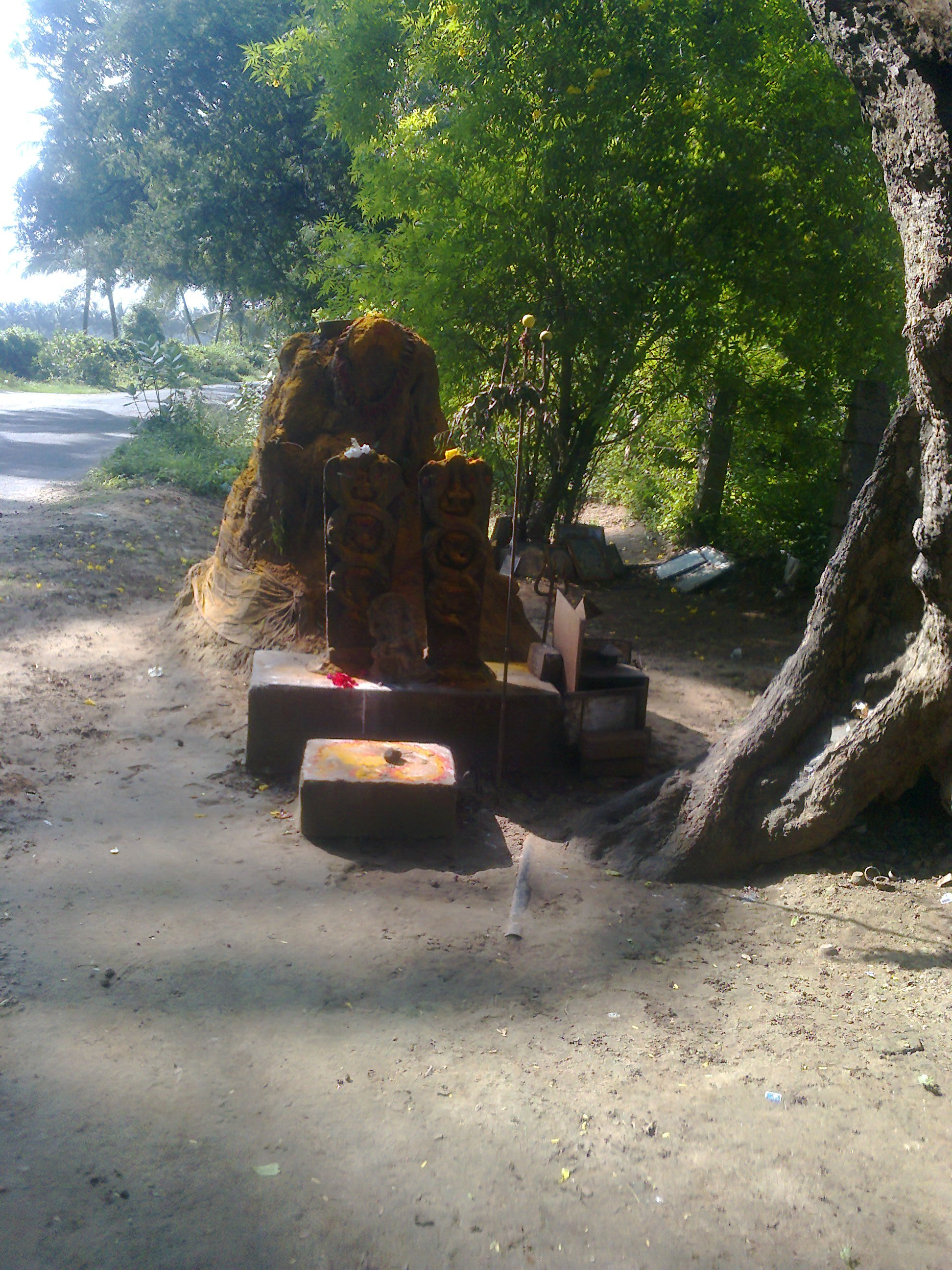
A roadside temple to Snakes, Tamil Nadu, India

nāgas form an important part of Hindu mythology. They play prominent roles in various legends:

- Shesha is the first king of the nagas, one of the two mounts of Vishnu.
- Vasuki is the second king of the nagas, commonly depicted around Shiva's neck.
- Kaliya is an antagonist of Krishna.
- Manasa is the goddess of the snakes.
- Astika is a half-Brahmin and half-naga sage.
- Patanjali was a sage and author of the Yoga Sutras, and was said to be the embodiment of Shesha, the divine serpent who forms Vishnu's couch.
- Takshaka was the ruler of the Khandava forest who later killed Parikshit in revenge against the Pandavas for burning the forest.
- Naga Panchami is an important Hindu festival associated with snake worship, which takes place on the fifth day of Shravana (July–August). Snake idols are offered gifts of milk and incense to help the worshipper gain knowledge, wealth, and fame.

Different districts of Bengal celebrate the serpent in various ways. In the districts of East Mymensingh, West Sylhet, and North Tippera, serpent-worship rituals were very similar, however. On the very last day of the Bengali month Shravana, all of these districts celebrate serpent-worship each year. Regardless of their class and station, every family during this time created a clay model of the serpent-deity – usually the serpent-goddess with two snakes spreading their hoods on her shoulders. The people worshiped this model at their homes and sacrificed a goat or a pigeon for the deity's honor. Before the clay goddess was submerged in water at the end of the festival, the clay snakes were taken from her shoulders. The people believed that the earth from which these snakes were made cured illnesses, especially children's diseases.

These districts also worshiped an object known as a Karandi. Resembling a small house made of cork, the Karandi is decorated with images of snakes, the snake goddess, and snake legends on its walls and roof. The blood of sacrificed animals was sprinkled on the Karandi and it also was submerged in the river at the end of the festival.

Among the Khasi tribe of Meghalaya, there exists a legend of snake worshiping. The snake deity is called "U Thlen" (lit: Python or large serpent) and it is said to demand human sacrifice from his worshippers. Those who can provide the Thlen with human blood are usually rewarded with riches, but he would shame those who cannot provide the needed sacrifice. The subject of the Thlen is still a sensitive subject among the Khasis. In some rural areas in recent years, people have been killed in the name of being "Nongshohnoh" or Keepers of the Thlen, the evil snake god.

As kuladevatas, nagas are worship at many parts of India including Madhya Pradesh and Gujarat.

Finally, another tradition in Hindu culture relating to yoga brings up kundalini, a type of spiritual energy said to sit at the base of the human spine. The term means "coiled snake" in Sanskrit roots and several goddesses are associated with its vitality. Durga(wife of shiva) also known as parvati), one of the main Hindu goddesses, is often symbolised by a giant snake in many tribal regions of Bengal and Tamil Nadu.

=== China ===
In traditional Chinese creation myth, the female and male deities Nüwa and Fuxi, bearers of the compass and square tools, are depicted as beings with serpent-like lower bodies.

Eight dragon kings who assembled at the gathering where Shakyamuni preached the Lotus Sutra, as described in the sutra. Kumarajiva's translation of the Lotus Sutra refers to them by their Sanskrit names: Nanda, Upananda, Sagara, Vasuki, Takshaka, Anavatapta, Manasvin, and Utpalaka. According to the "Introduction" (first) chapter of the Lotus Sutra, each attends the gathering accompanied by several hundreds of thousands of followers.

=== Korea ===
In Korean mythology, Eobsin, the wealth goddess, appears as an eared, black snake. Chilseongsin (the Jeju Island equivalent to Eobsin) and her seven daughters are all snakes. These goddesses are deities of orchards, courts, and protect the home. According to the Jeju Pungtorok, "The people fear snakes. They worship it as a god...When they see a snake, they call it a great god, and do not kill it or chase it away." The reason for snakes symbolizing worth was because they ate rats and other pests.

=== Japan ===
It has been theorized that the shimenawa, the sacred braided straw ropes of Shinto ritual, may be symbolic of snakes. (Note: Hori: "蛇の尾のからみ合う様子を注連縄にたとえたので、顔をしかめる方がおられたかもしれませんが、実は注連縄は蛇の生殖力信仰からきたものなのです (Although some may frown upon my comparison of shimenawa to snakes coiling around themselves, actually, the shimenawa shimenawa derives from serpent-fertility beliefs)".)

Some commentators such as folklorist Ken'ichi Tanigawa have contended that the Japanese creation gods Izanami and Izanagi may have been serpent deities, possibly with serpent bodies, akin to of Nüwa and Fuxi (cf. § China above). As the Nüwa and Fuxi are commonly depicted with their snake-tails wrapped around a single pole, (Note: Hori compares this to the caduceus.) the similarity to Izanami and Izanagi is self-evident, as Izanami and Izanagi circled around the pole (in different direction) (Note: Volker compares this to the may pole.) in their act of procreating, and their first offspring was a failure, a limbless hiruko ("leech-child").

==== Miwa deity ====
A major serpent deity in Japanese mythology is the god of Mount Miwa, i.e. Ōmononushi, and the shrine dedicated to it (Ōmiwa Jinja) is active and venerated to the present-day. According to the mythology, this serpent deity assumes human form and visits women, begetting offspring. According to mythology, one of the targets of his passion, the Lady Ikutamayori or Ikutamayorihime sought to discover his identity by attaching a yarn to the hem of his clothing ("The Mt. Miwa Story"). (Note: This motif has been likened to Ariadne's thread that guided Theseus.) Another wife, Lady Yamatohimomotoso, committed suicide with chopstick[s] after learning her husband was of serpent-form ("Legend of Hashihaka (Grave of Chopstick[s])").

Some versions of the legend of Matsura Sayohime(var. Lady Otohi or Otohi-hime) are classed as the Miwasan-kei setsuwa (三輪山型説話; "stories of the Mt. Miwa pattern") (Note: Cranston remarks that a myth similar to the "Grave of Chopstick" myth above (his tale 122) has been interpolated, but other scholars prefer to compare the Lady Otohi legend to "The Mt. Miwa Story" because they both share the motif of the lady attaching a thread to her husband to discover his true identity to be a snake. Kelsey does not categorize this as a god-husband tale, i.e., the, pp. 219, 232, lists it instead among the "Violent Deities", subtype "IV. Sexual Violence", p. 231.) But there is no enduring sign of snake worship in the original vicinity of the legend in the Matsura region, where a local shrine houses the supposed petrified remains, or bōfuseki (望夫石; "rock that contemplates the husband"), of Lady Matsura. (Note: Sayohime Shrine, part of Tashima Shrine.)

==== Orochi ====
The term orochi (大蛇) means literally "giant snake", the well-known example being the 八岐の大蛇 (read as yamata no orochi), the eight-forked giant serpent. This monster that devoured maidens in Izumo Province was also a deity, and addressed as such by the hero-god Susanoo who defeated the snake. (Note: "Thou art an Awful Deity" or kashikoki kami ([可]畏き神).)

It has been assumed that in more real terms, an annual offering of "human sacrifice" was being made to the serpent deity, a god of field and fertility, bestowing "fertility of crops and the productivity of man and cattle", or in terms of the specific rice crop, orochi was perhaps a "god of the river" which controlled the influx of irrigation water to the rice field.

Whether "human sacrifice" in this case meant actually putting the maiden to death is a subject of debate and controversy. It has been asserted human offerings (to the river god) were nonexistent in Japan, (Note: Even ritual animal sacrifices (cattle) to the god of the river were imported from Korea and China, with the deed of slaughter being conducted by foreigners (toraijin) from these lands. It may be noted that Gadeleva's paper remarks on one of Susanoo's antics of skinning a horse (p. 179), which she connects with a rainmaker ritual (p. 190), and touches on the theory that Susanoo had a foreigner from Silla (Shiragi), whose name signifies 'shaman' in Old Korean (p. 168).) or that human offerings to the field deity were never widespread. (Note: Kelsey (endnote 21) comments that Takeshi Matsumae whom he consulted thought the practice probably did not exist (Matsumae (1970), p. 170), whereas Takeo Matsumura seems to accept that it did exist (Matsumura (1955), pp. 213–215). But cf. Matsumura's hypothesis below.)

In the Yamata-no-orochi episode, mythologist Takeo Matsumura hypothesized that the involved ritual was not an actual homicidal sacrifice of a maiden, but the appointment of a miko shamaness serving the snake deity, which would be a lifelong position. He proposed there was an earlier version of the myth, coining the name ogi itsuki kei (招ぎ齋き型; "[god]-invocation/invitation and purification type"), which was later altered to a serpent-slaying form, or taiji kei (退治型; "eradication type"). (Note: Matsumae (1970) writing later uses the phraseology kamiogi kei (神招ぎ型; "god-invocation/invitation type").)

=== Cambodia ===
Serpents, or nāgas, play a particularly important role in Cambodian mythology. A well-known story explains the emergence of the Khmer people from the union of Indian and indigenous elements, the latter being represented as nāgas. According to the story, an Indian merchant named Kaundinya came to Cambodia, which at the time was under the dominion of the nāga king. The nāga princess Soma sallied forth to fight against the invader but was defeated. Presented with the option of marrying the victorious Kaundinya, Soma readily agreed to do so, and together they ruled the land. The Khmer people are their descendants.

=== Thailand ===
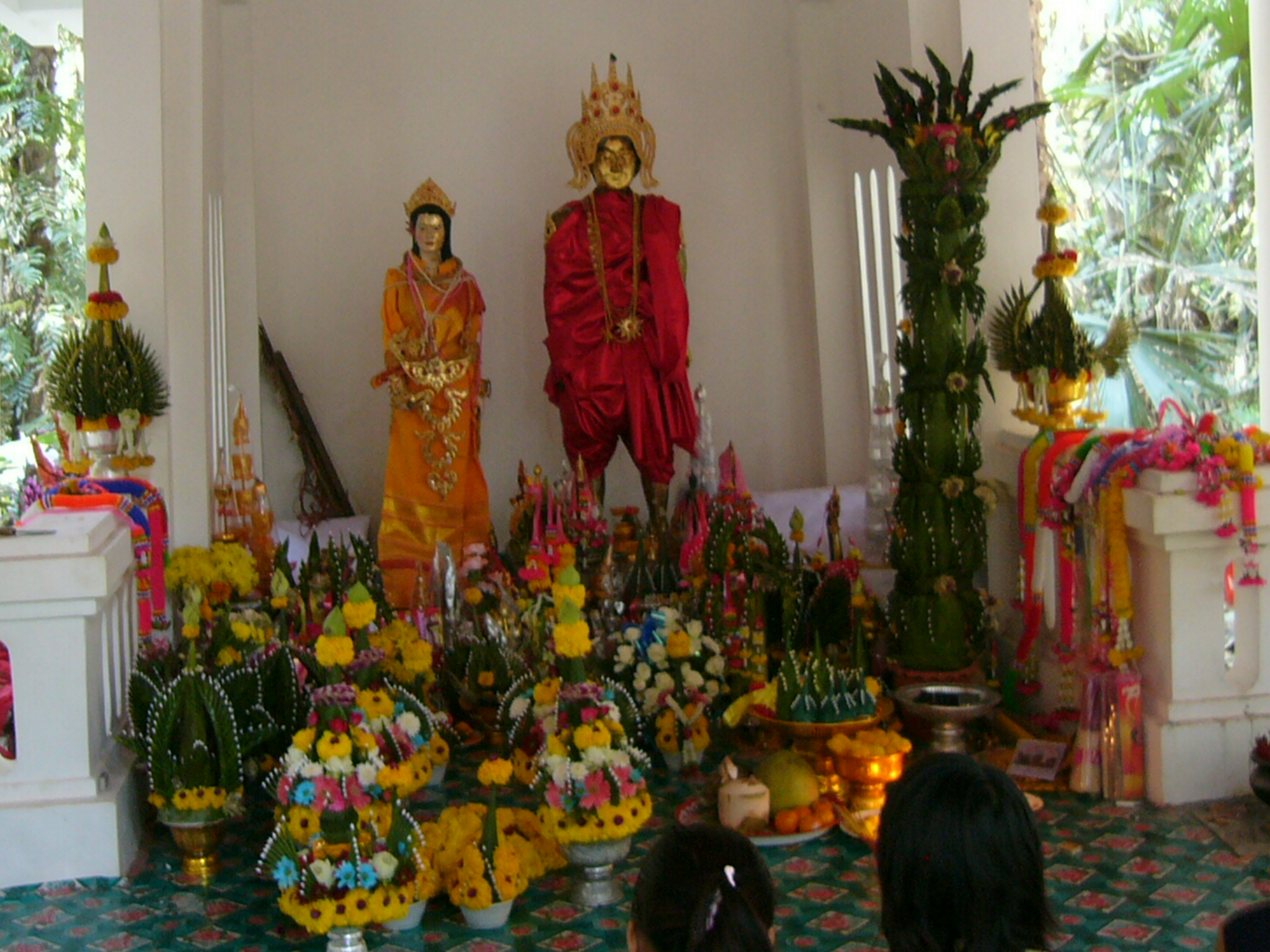
Shri Sutho Naga of Kham Chanod Forest in Ban Dung district, Udon Thani province, Isan, Thailand. Kham Chanod is considered the spiritual center of snake worship in Thai folk beliefs.

Snake worship is very popular in Thailand, where snakes are worshipped as deities and nāgas. Snake worship developed from the traditions of Tai folk religion and animism. It then was integrated with Hinduism and Buddhism. Snake worship is practiced most heavily in the Northeast of Thailand.

Nagas worshipped in Thailand have three origins: Tai folk religion, Hinduism, and Buddhism. Nagas popular in Tai belief include Shri Sutho Naga (พญาศรีสุทโธนาคราช) and his wife Nagi Shri Patumma (นาคีศรีปทุมมา). Both are worshipped in the Kham Chanod Forest in Ban Dung district of the Udon Thani province. Other prominent Naga in Tai folk religion include: Suvananaga (พญาสุวรรณนาคราช), Sattanaga (พญาศรีสัตตนาคราช) and the Cobra Goddess Guardian Rama II (เจ้าแม่งูจงอาง พระรามสอง). Nagas originating in Hinduism include Shesha and Nagalakshmi, while those originating in Thai Buddhism include Mucilinda and Virūpākṣa.

== Europe ==
=== Ancient Rome ===
In Italy, the Marsian goddess Angitia, whose name derives from the word for "serpent," was associated with witches, snakes, and snake-charmers. Angitia is believed to have also been a goddess of healing. Her worship was centered in the Central Apennine region.

On the Iberian Peninsula there is evidence that before the introduction of Christianity, and perhaps more strongly before Roman invasions, serpent worship was a standout feature of local religions (see Sugaar). To this day there are numerous traces in European popular belief, especially in Germany, of respect for the snake, possibly a survival of ancestor worship: The "house snake" cares for the cows and the children, and its appearance is an omen of death; and the lives of a pair of house snakes are often held to be bound with that of the master and the mistress. Tradition states that one of the Gnostic sects known as the Ophites caused a tame serpent to coil around the sacramental bread, and worshiped it as the representative of the Savior. In Lanuvium (32 km from Rome) a big snake was venerated as a god and they offered human sacrifice to it.

=== Ancient Greece ===
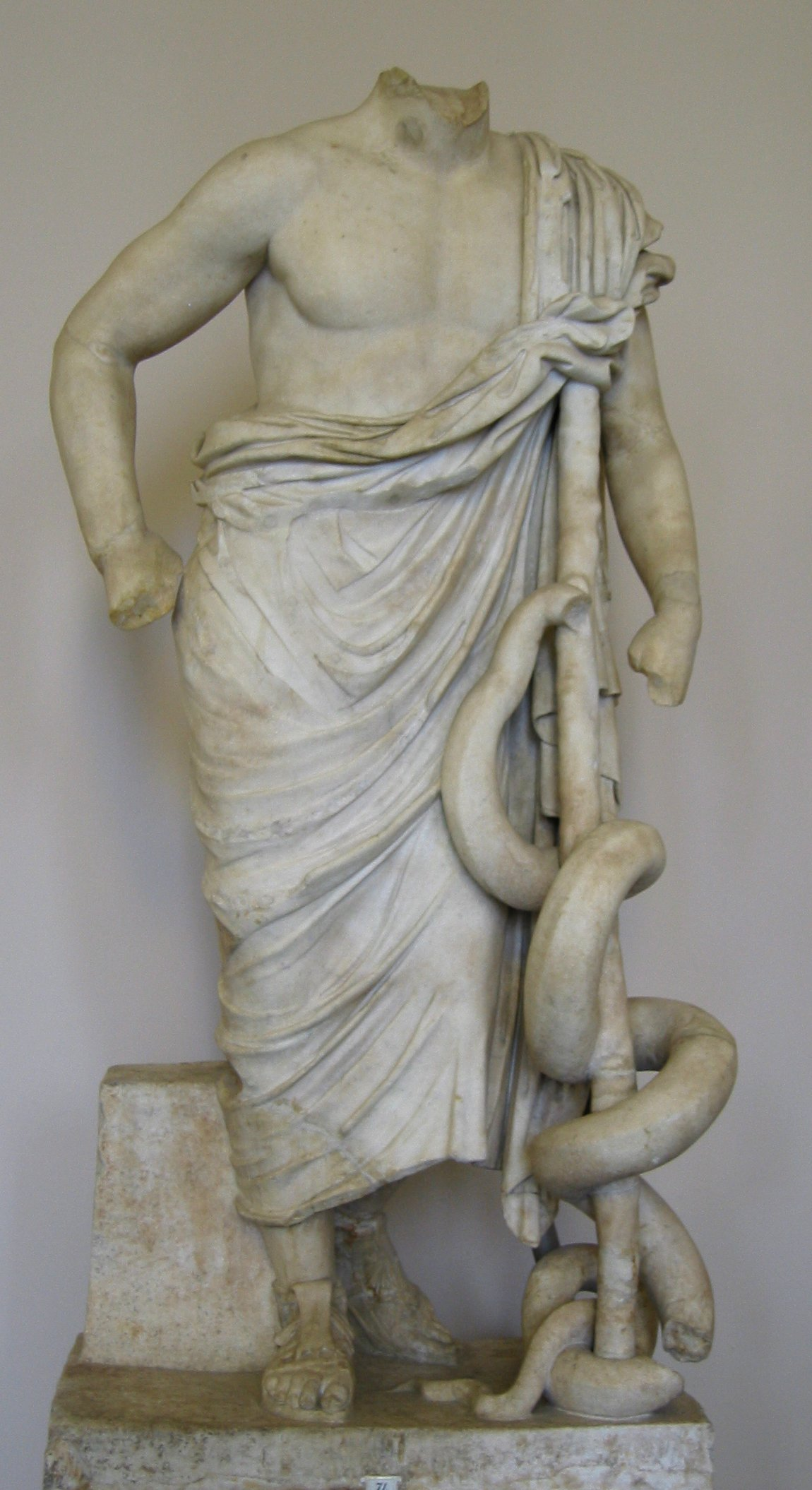
Statue of Asclepius in the Pergamon Museum, Berlin

Serpents figured prominently in archaic Greek myths. According to some sources, Ophion ("serpent", a.k.a. Ophioneus), ruled the world with Eurynome before the two of them were cast down by Kronos and Rhea. The oracles of the ancient Greeks were said to have been the continuation of the tradition begun with the worship of the Egyptian cobra goddess, Wadjet. Herodotus mentions a great serpent which defended the citadel of Athens.

The Minoan Snake Goddess brandished a serpent in either hand, perhaps evoking her role as a source of wisdom, rather than her role as Mistress of the Animals (Potnia Theron), with a leopard under each arm. It is not by accident that later the infant Herakles, a liminal hero on the threshold between the old ways and the new Olympian world, also brandished the two serpents that "threatened" him in his cradle. Although the Classical Greeks were clear that these snakes represented a threat, the snake-brandishing gesture of Herakles is the same as that of the Cretan goddess.

Typhon, the enemy of the Olympian gods, is described as a vast grisly monster with a hundred heads and a hundred serpents issuing from his thighs, who was conquered and cast into Tartarus by Zeus, or confined beneath volcanic regions, where he is the cause of eruptions. Typhon is thus the chthonic figuration of volcanic forces. Amongst his children by Echidna are Cerberus (a monstrous three-headed dog with a snake for a tail and a serpentine mane), the serpent-tailed Chimaera, the serpent-like water beast Hydra, and the hundred-headed serpentine dragon Ladon. Both the Lernaean Hydra and Ladon were slain by Herakles.

Python, an enemy of Apollo, was always represented in vase-paintings and by sculptors as a serpent. Apollo slew Python and made her former home, Delphi, his own oracle. The Pythia took her title from the name Python.

Amphisbaena, a Greek word, from amphis, meaning "both ways", and bainein, meaning "to go", also called the "Mother of Ants", is a mythological, ant-eating serpent with a head at each end. According to Greek mythology, the mythological amphisbaena was spawned from the blood that dripped from Medusa the Gorgon's head as Perseus flew over the Libyan Desert with her head in his hand.

Medusa and the other Gorgons were vicious female monsters with sharp fangs and hair of living, venomous snakes whose origins predate the written myths of Greece and who were the protectors of the most ancient ritual secrets. The Gorgons wore a belt of two intertwined serpents in the same configuration of the caduceus. The Gorgon was placed at the highest point and central of the relief on the Parthenon.

Asclepius, the son of Apollo and Coronis, learned the secrets of keeping death at bay after observing one serpent bringing another (which Asclepius himself had fatally wounded) healing herbs. To prevent the entire human race from becoming immortal under Asclepius's care, Zeus killed him with a bolt of lightning. Asclepius' death at the hands of Zeus illustrates man's inability to challenge the natural order that separates mortal men from the gods. In honor of Asclepius, snakes were often used in healing rituals. Non-venomous Aesculapian snakes were left to crawl on the floor in dormitories where the sick and injured slept. The author of the Bibliotheca claimed that Athena gave Asclepius a vial of blood from the Gorgons. Gorgon blood had magical properties: if taken from the left side of the Gorgon, it was a fatal poison; from the right side, the blood was capable of bringing the dead back to life. However Euripides wrote in his tragedy Ion that the Athenian queen Creusa had inherited this vial from her ancestor Erichthonios, who was a snake himself. In this version the blood of Medusa had the healing power while the lethal poison originated from Medusa's serpents. Zeus placed Asclepius in the sky as the constellation Ophiucus, "the Serpent-Bearer". The modern symbol of medicine is the rod of Asclepius, a snake twining around a staff, while the symbol of pharmacy is the bowl of Hygieia, a snake twining around a cup or bowl. Hygieia was a daughter of Asclepius.

Olympias, the mother of Alexander the Great and a princess of the primitive land of Epirus, had the reputation of a snake-handler, and it was in serpent form that Zeus was said to have fathered Alexander upon her; tame snakes were still to be found at Macedonian Pella in the 2nd century AD (Lucian, Alexander the false prophet) and at Ostia a bas-relief shows paired coiled serpents flanking a dressed altar, symbols or embodiments of the Lares of the household, worthy of veneration (Veyne 1987 illus p 211).

=== Celtic religion ===
Among other things, the Celtic goddess Brigid was said to be associated with serpents. Her festival day, Imbolc, is traditionally a time for weather prognostication based on observing whether serpents or badgers came from their winter dens, which may be a forerunner of the North American Groundhog Day. A Scottish Gaelic proverb about the day is:

Thig an nathair as an toll
Là donn Brìde,
Ged robh trì troighean dhen t-sneachd
Air leac an làir.

Translation:

The serpent will come from the hole
On the brown Day of Bríde,
Though there should be three feet of snow
On the flat surface of the ground.

Additionally in Celtic areas, but not necessarily directly related the religion, serpent amulets were thought to protect one from all harm. Further proving the importance of serpents

=== Norse religion ===
The Norse religion had the Midgard Serpent, (Jormungandr) which was a giant serpent that wrapped around the entire earth. Although it wasn't explicitly worshiped, its fate is closely tied to the Ragnarok event in the mythos that was synonymous with the end of the world. The Norse people probably got the idea of this snake from the nearby Germanic religions

== Images ==
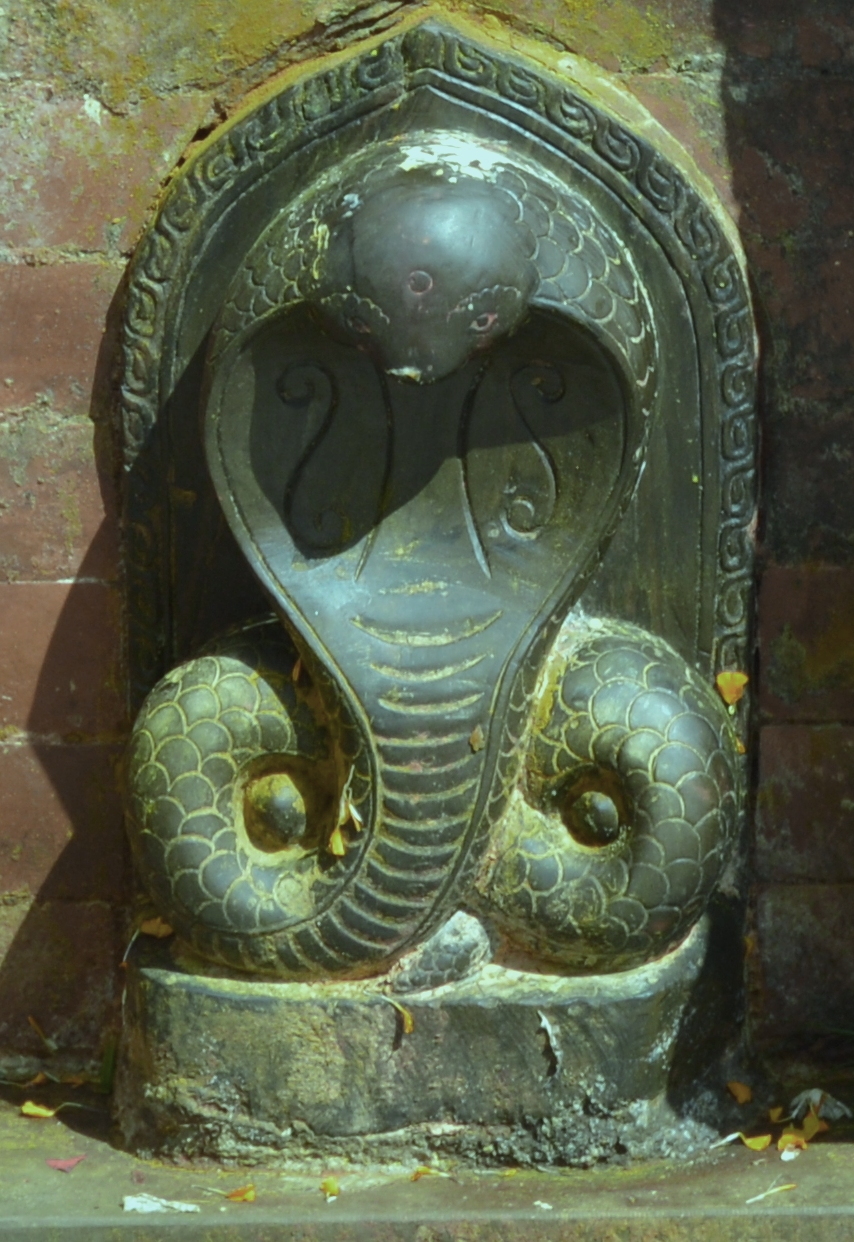
Naag or serpent at Naksaal, Kathmandu

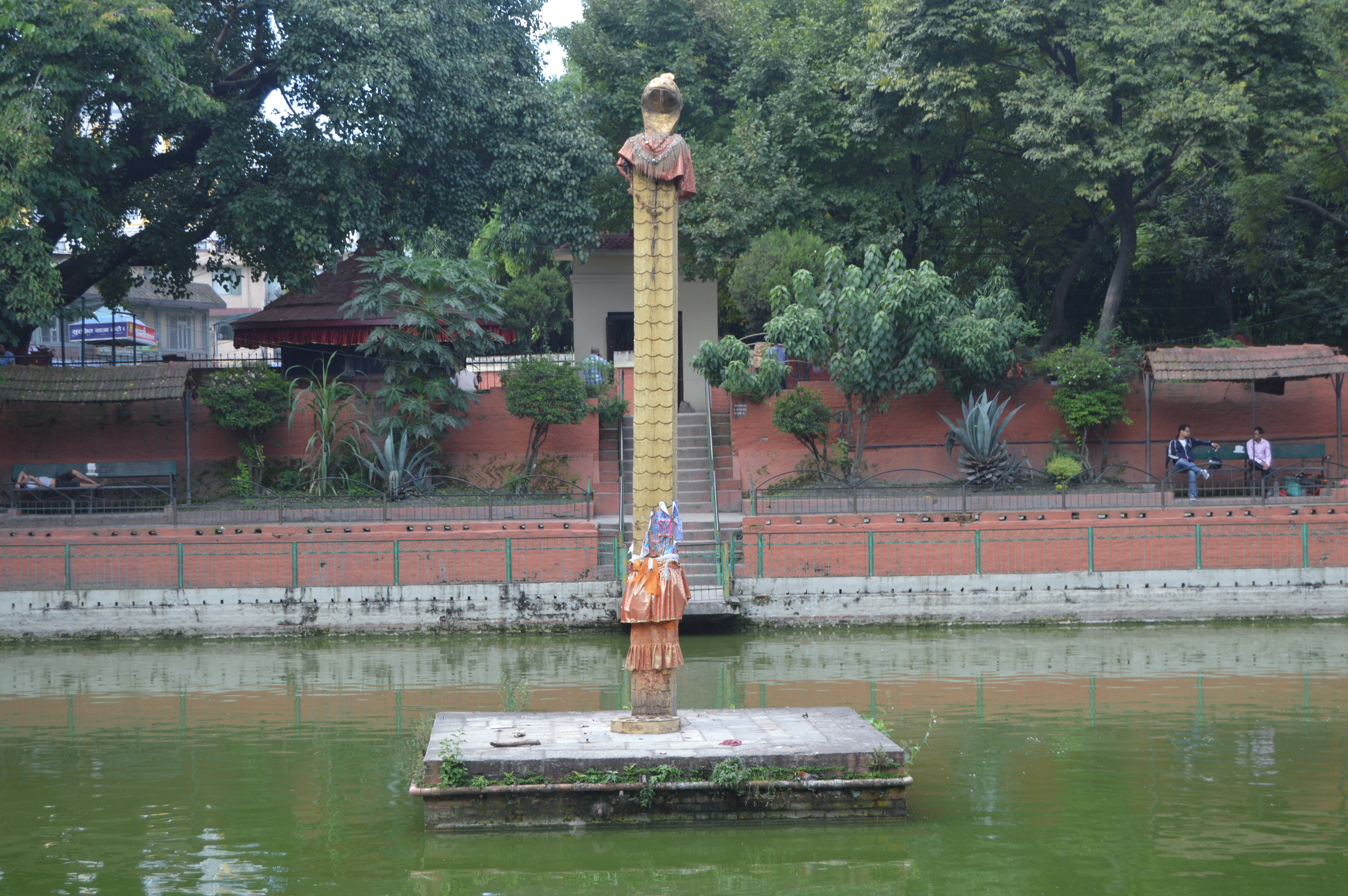
Nag at Nag pokhari, Naksaal, Kathmandu

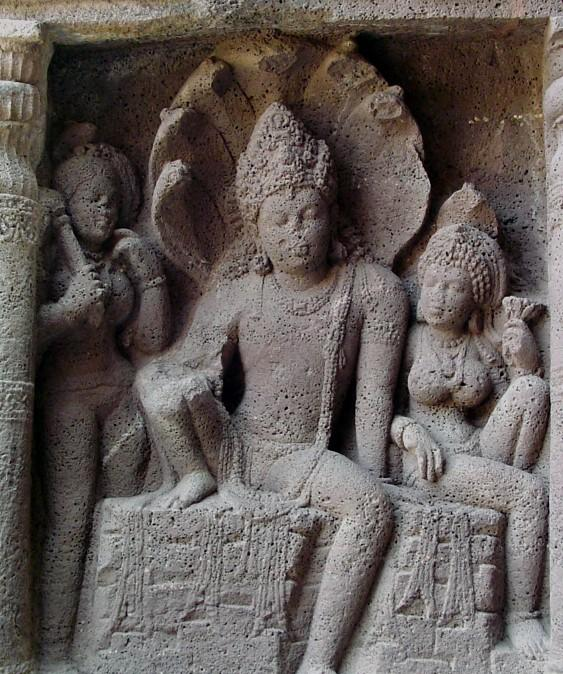
The Snake God Naga and his consort.The photo is taken at the cave temples clusters of Ajanta, Maharashtra, India

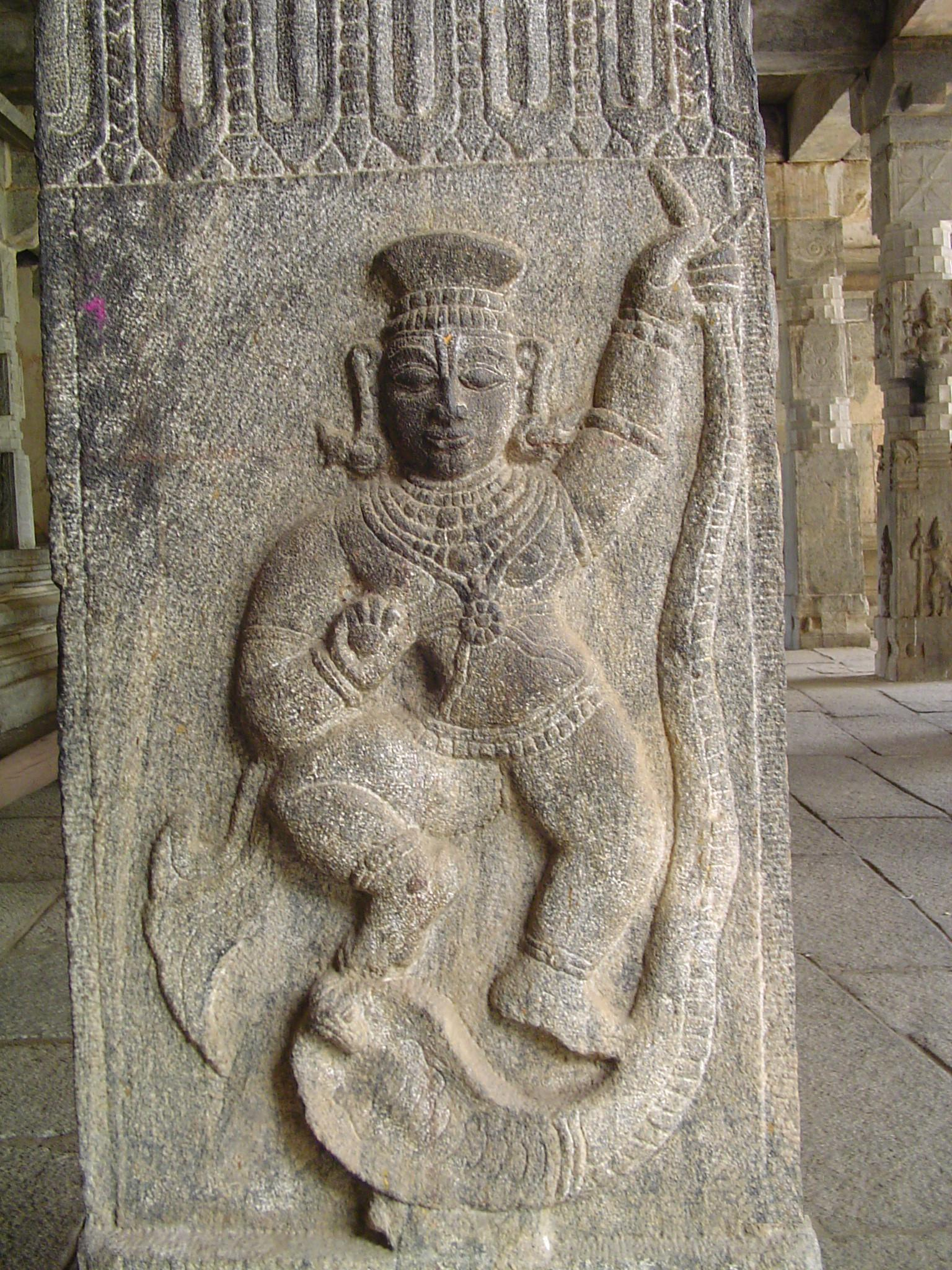
Krishna dancing over snake Kaliya at the sand-covered temple ruins in Talakkadu, Karnataka, India.

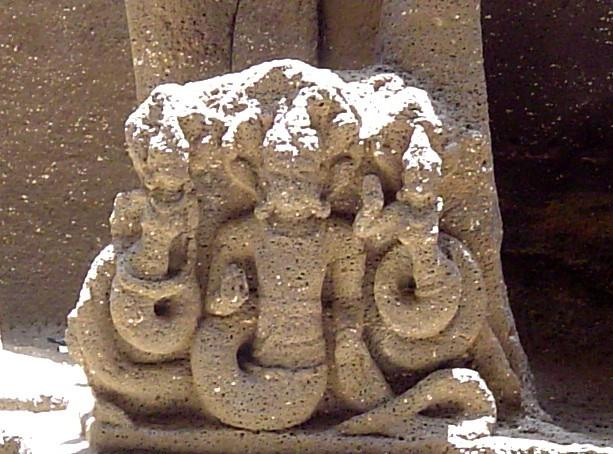
A motif of a snake goddess. Carving on volcanic rock at the Kailash Temple, Ellora, India

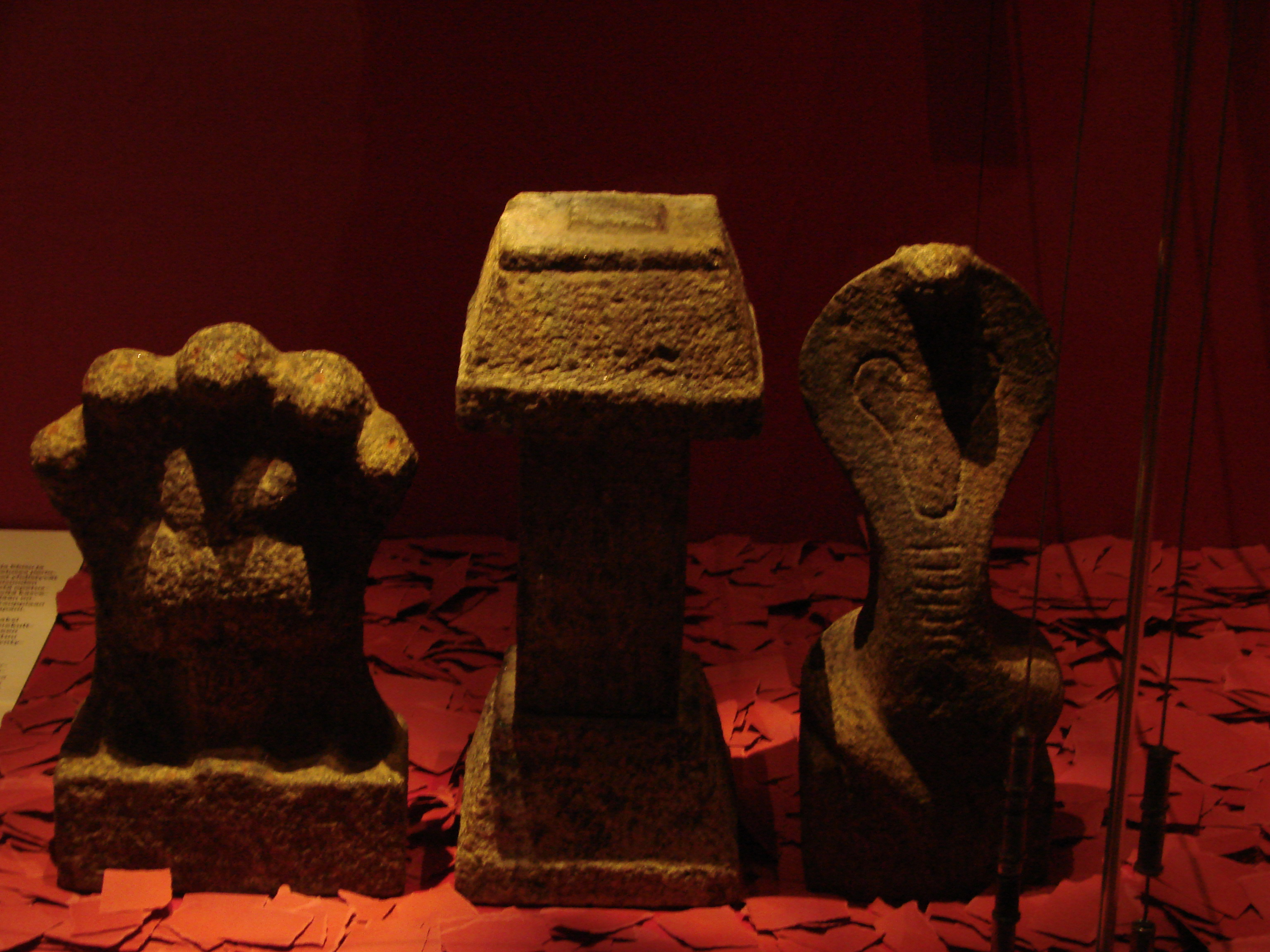
A snake worship altar from South India

== See also ==
- Snake handling in Christianity
- George Went Hensley
