= Kham Chanot =

Island in Thailand

คำชะโนด
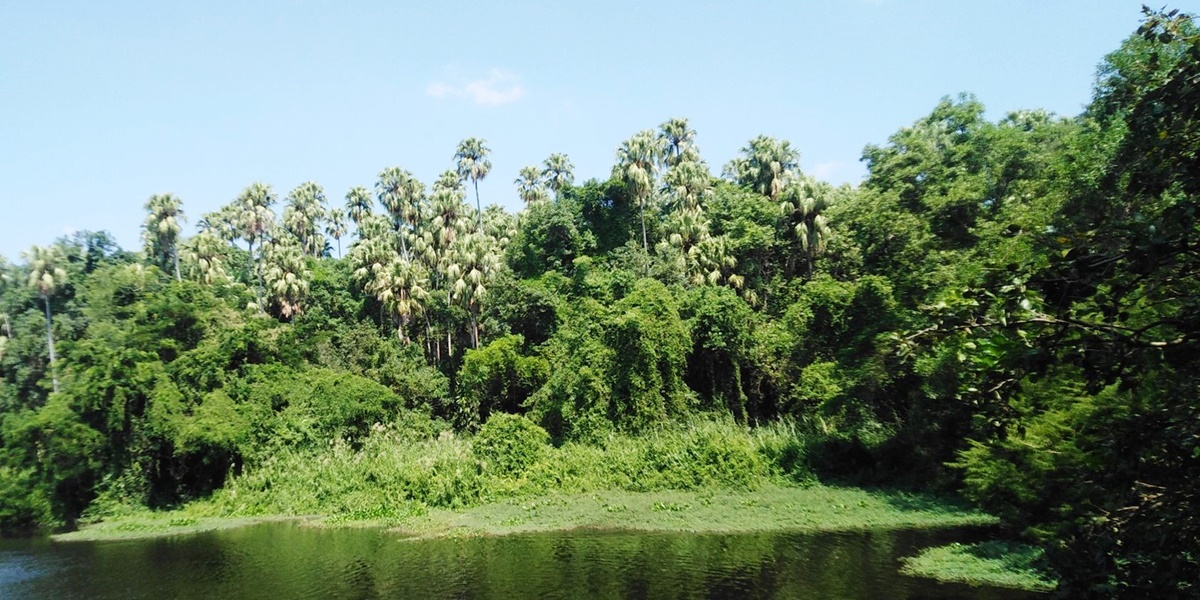
- Kham Chanot in 2022

Geography
- Location: Isan
- Coordinates: 17°53′35.16″N 103°2′43.08″E
- Type: River island
- Area: 32,000 km^{2} (12,000 sq mi)

Administration
- Thailand
- Province: Udon Thani
- District: Ban Dung
- Subdistricts: Wang Thong, Ban Muang, Ban Chan

Additional information
- Time zone: UTC+7 (ICT)

Kham Chanot (Thai: คำชะโนด, pronounced [kʰām t͡ɕʰā.nòːt]) is a forested island and cultural site located in Ban Dung District, Udon Thani Province, northeastern Thailand. It is widely known in Thai folklore and popular belief as a sacred place associated with Nāga (mythical serpent beings in Southeast Asian mythology), particularly the legend of "Phaya Naga" believed to reside beneath the waters and forested swamp of the area.

== Geography ==
Located in Ban Dung District, Udon Thani Province, the site spans an area of approximately 20 rai (7.9 acres) and is administratively associated with three subdistricts: Wang Thong, Ban Muang, and Ban Chan.

The island is surrounded by seasonal marshland and water channels, forming a distinct wetland ecosystem. It is accessible via a bridge connecting it to the mainland.

Kham Chanot is named after the dense growth of the Chanot palm (Livistona saribus), a species in the palm family that can grow up to approximately 30 m (98.4 ft) in height. This plant is relatively uncommon in Thailand, but forms dense stands within the area, contributing to the island's distinctive appearance and ecological character.

== Cultural & religious significance ==
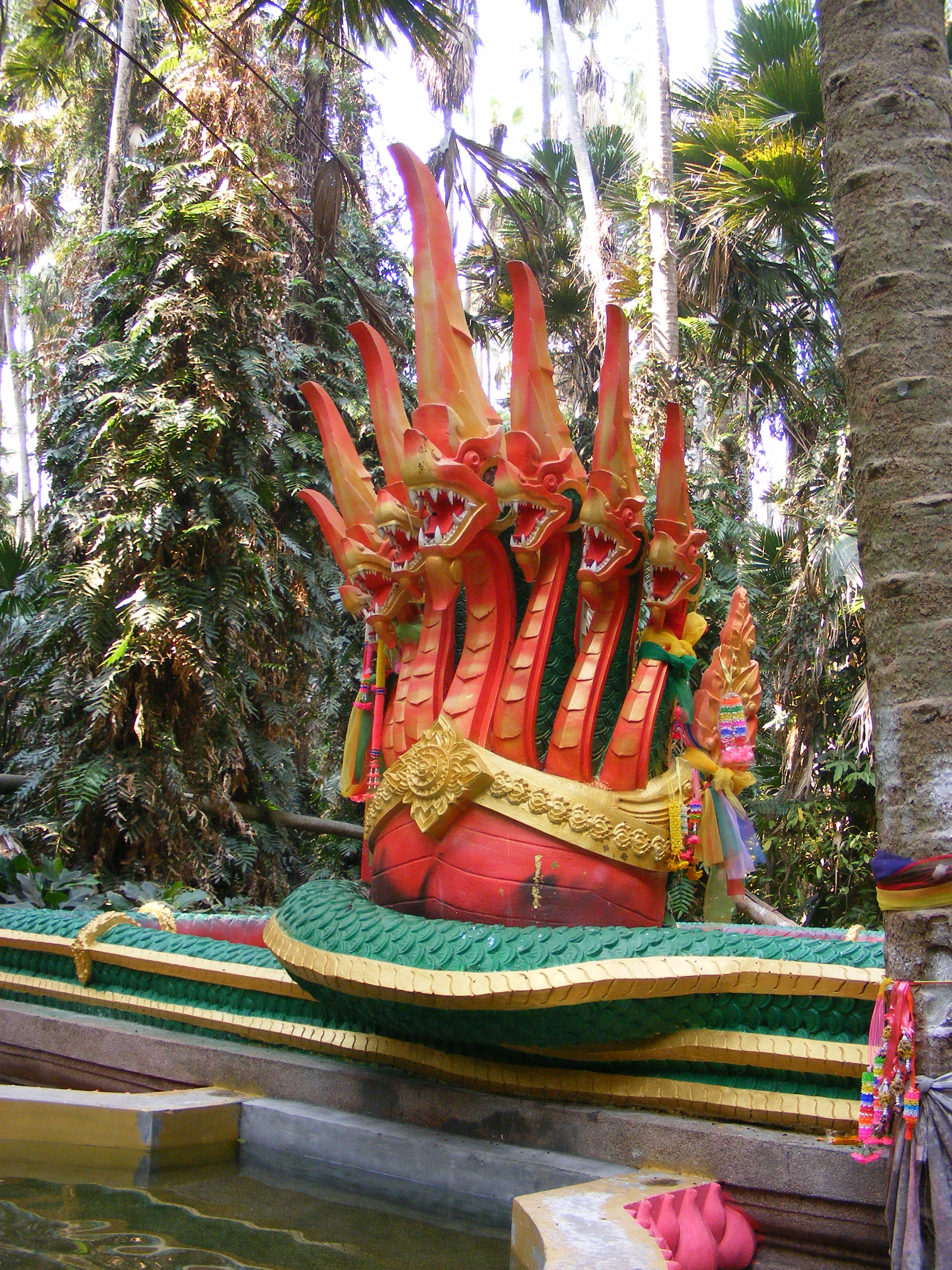
A multi-headed Nāga statue at Kham Chanot

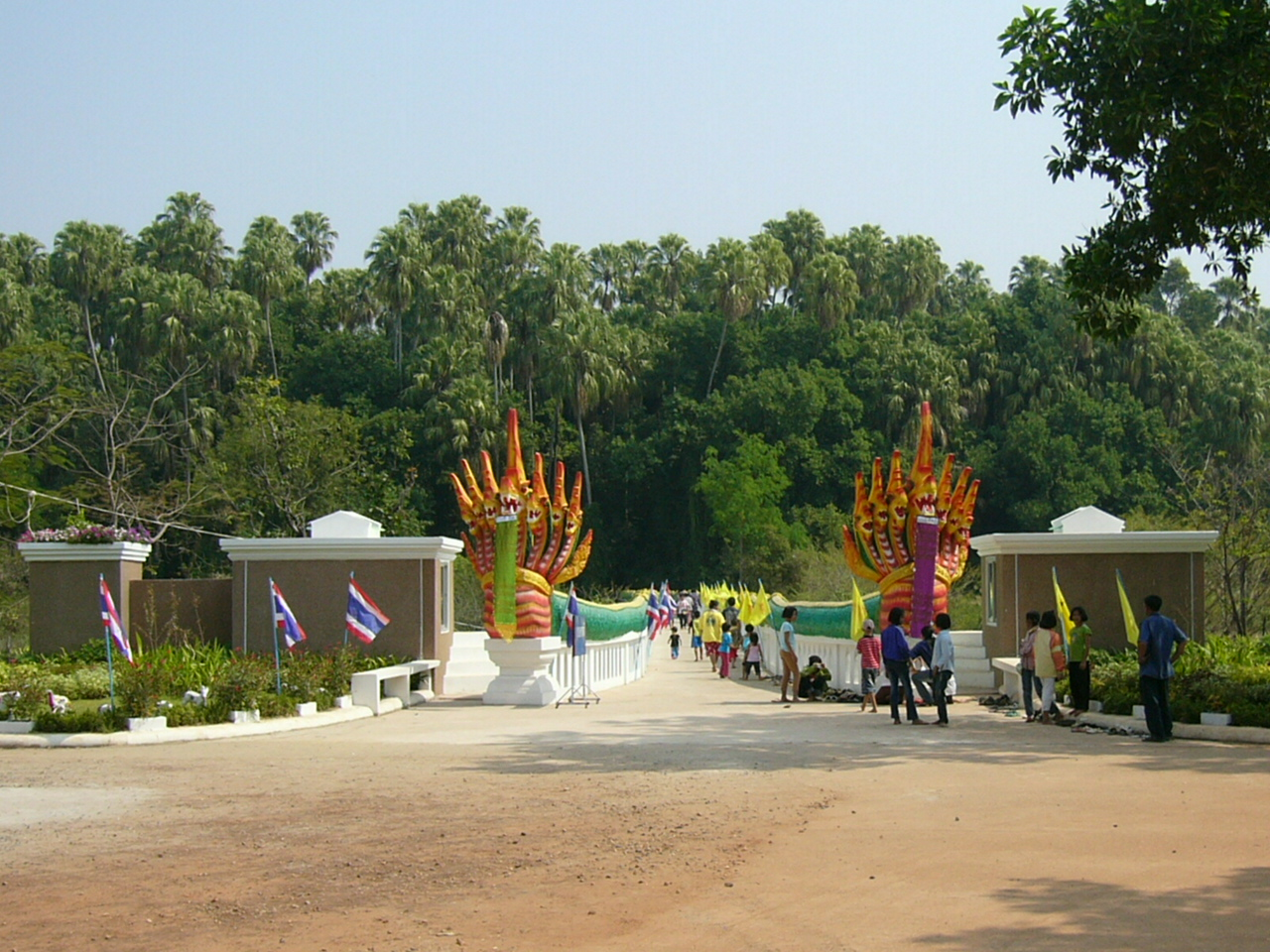
The bridge leading to Kham Chanot, believed in local folklore to serve as a passage between the human world and the subterranean realm of the Nāga

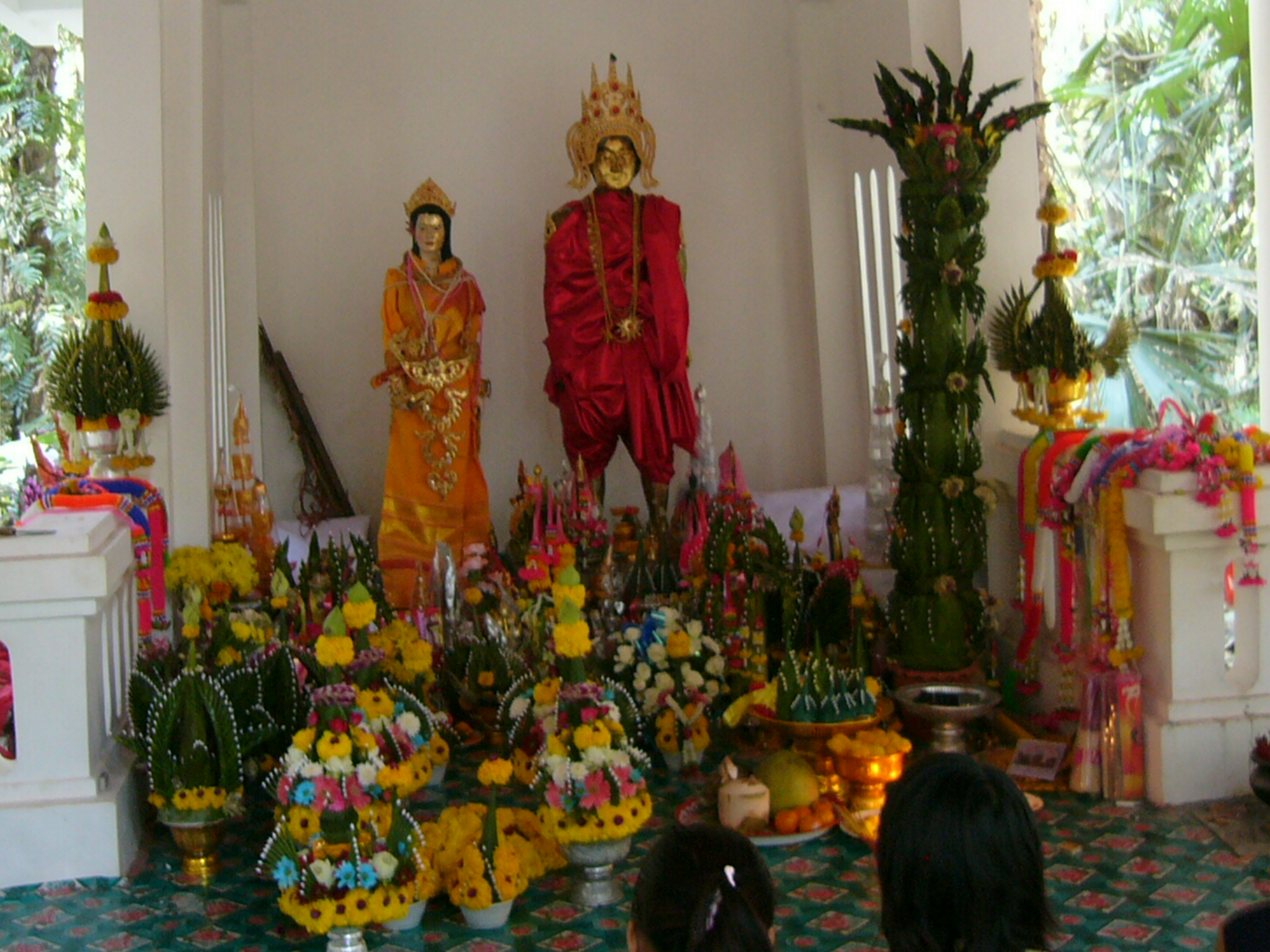
Statues of Pu Sri Suttho and Ya Sri Pathumma

Kham Chanot is regarded as one of the most important sacred sites in northeastern Thailand, also known as Isan. It is closely associated with the belief in the Nāga, serpent-like beings in Buddhist and local mythological traditions who are believed to inhabit rivers, lakes, and underground realms.

At the centre of the site is a shrine dedicated to "Pu Sri Suttho" (ปู่ศรีสุทโธ) and "Ya Sri Pathumma" (ย่าศรีปทุมมา), legendary Nāga figures worshipped by visitors. Many pilgrims visit the site to make offerings, seek blessings, and participate in ritual practices.

The site is also linked to dreams, visions, and personal spiritual experiences reported by visitors, which contribute to its reputation as a mystical location.

== Folklore ==
According to local legend, Kham Chanot is believed to be a gateway between the human world and the realm of the Nāga. It is often described as a place where the boundary between physical reality and mythological belief is perceived to be thin. These narratives are part of broader Southeast Asian serpent mythology, which is common in Mekong basin cultures.

Kham Chanot is also regarded in local belief as a "mysterious" or spiritually significant place where supernatural phenomena are frequently reported. Several widely circulated stories have contributed to its reputation in contemporary Thai folklore.

One well-known account dates back to approximately the early 1989, when a traveling outdoor film crew reportedly visited the area to screen a movie for local residents. According to the story as it is commonly told, the crew was advised by local people to complete the screening before 4:00 a.m. and to leave the area before dawn.

During the screening, the audience was described as behaving unusually. Men and women were reportedly seated separately, and there were no vendors, no children running or playing, and no conversation, laughter, or visible enjoyment of the film as would normally be expected at a public outdoor screening. The audience allegedly remained completely silent and motionless, staring only at the screen throughout the event.

After the screening ended and the crew left the area, they reportedly encountered local residents near the entrance who stated that there were no permanent inhabitants living in the location where the screening had taken place. This account later became widely known in Thai popular culture as the story of the "ghost film crew" (ผีจ้างหนัง), and was subsequently adapted into a Thai horror film The Screen at Kamchanod released in 2007.

Another reported incident, dated to around May 2000, involves claims that video footage captured images interpreted by some viewers as a preta (hungry ghost) and a rukkhadeva (tree guardian spirit). The footage has circulated in local media.

== Investigation & skeptical accounts ==
Subsequent investigations into the "ghost film crew" legend associated with Kham Chanot suggest that the story may have originated from misunderstandings between the film crew and local audiences. A documentary investigation by Thai PBS reported that many supernatural claims were likely the result of later embellishment and misinterpretation.

According to these findings, widely circulated claims such as the death of all film crew members after the event or payment being made in the form of leaves or hell banknotes were not supported by verifiable evidence. The owner of the traveling film company stated that payment was made in legal currency and deposited into a bank account, and that a written contract for the screening still existed.

The investigation further indicated that the screening was part of a merit-making ceremony held in memory of the mother of a local sponsor who arranged the event. Witnesses present at the screening confirmed that it was a normal community gathering rather than a supernatural occurrence. It was also clarified that the location was not actually within the Kham Chanot area, as often claimed in later retellings.

Similarly, alleged video footage of a preta and a rukkhadeva was later exposed as a hoax carried out by individuals claiming to possess supernatural abilities. The individual involved was later identified as the leader of a fraudulent group accused of deceiving followers and soliciting money from believers. The incident became widely known in Thailand as the "Pret Ku" case.

Kham Chanot is widely regarded in local belief as a sacred place and is often described as a "floating island" that is protected from flooding. It is commonly believed that while surrounding areas experience seasonal flooding, the island itself remains unaffected due to its spiritual significance.

However, historical records and reports indicate that Kham Chanot has experienced flooding on several occasions, including in 1973, 1995, 2016, and 2017. In 2017, flooding was significant enough to temporarily close the site to visitors.

Some local interpretations suggest that increased construction of permanent structures such as shrines and religious buildings may have contributed to changes in water flow and drainage within the area, making the site more susceptible to flooding than previously believed.

From a scientific perspective, flooding patterns in the region are generally attributed to seasonal rainfall, hydrological conditions, and changes in land use within the surrounding wetland ecosystem.

== Tourism ==
Kham Chanot is a popular destination for religious tourism and cultural pilgrimage. Visitors travel from across Thailand and neighbouring countries, particularly during religious holidays and weekends.

== See also ==
- Wat Kham Chanot
- Nāga
- Thai folklore
- Ophiolatry
- List of reportedly haunted locations in Thailand
