= Wat Kham Chanot =

Buddhist temple in Udon Thani province, Thailand

Coordinates: 17.74321°N 103.359332°E

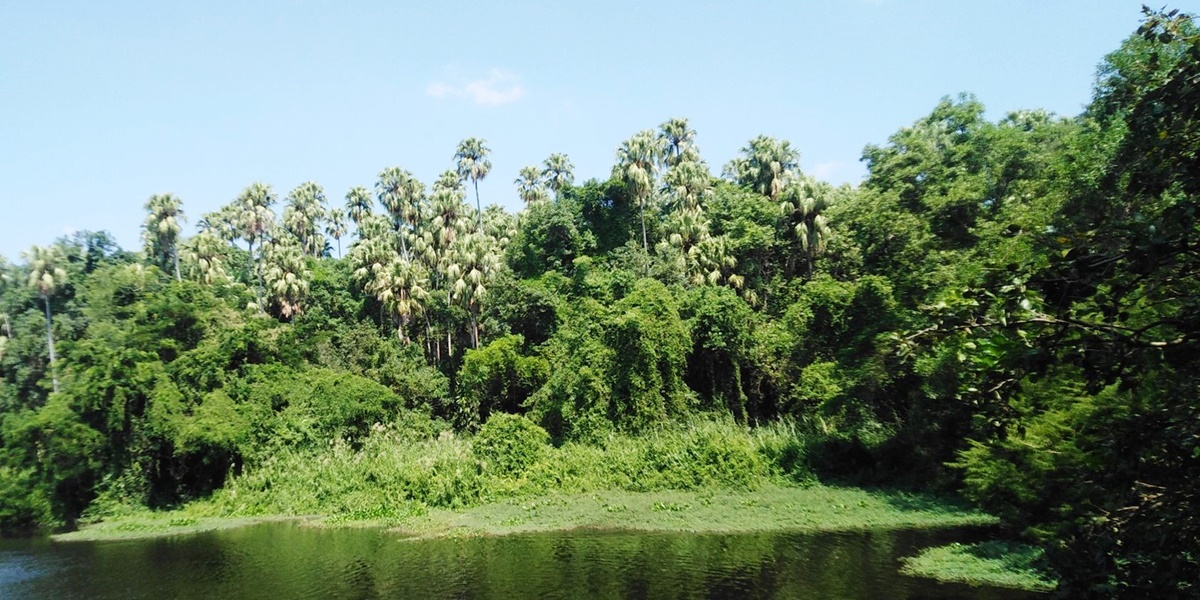
Kham Chanot forest

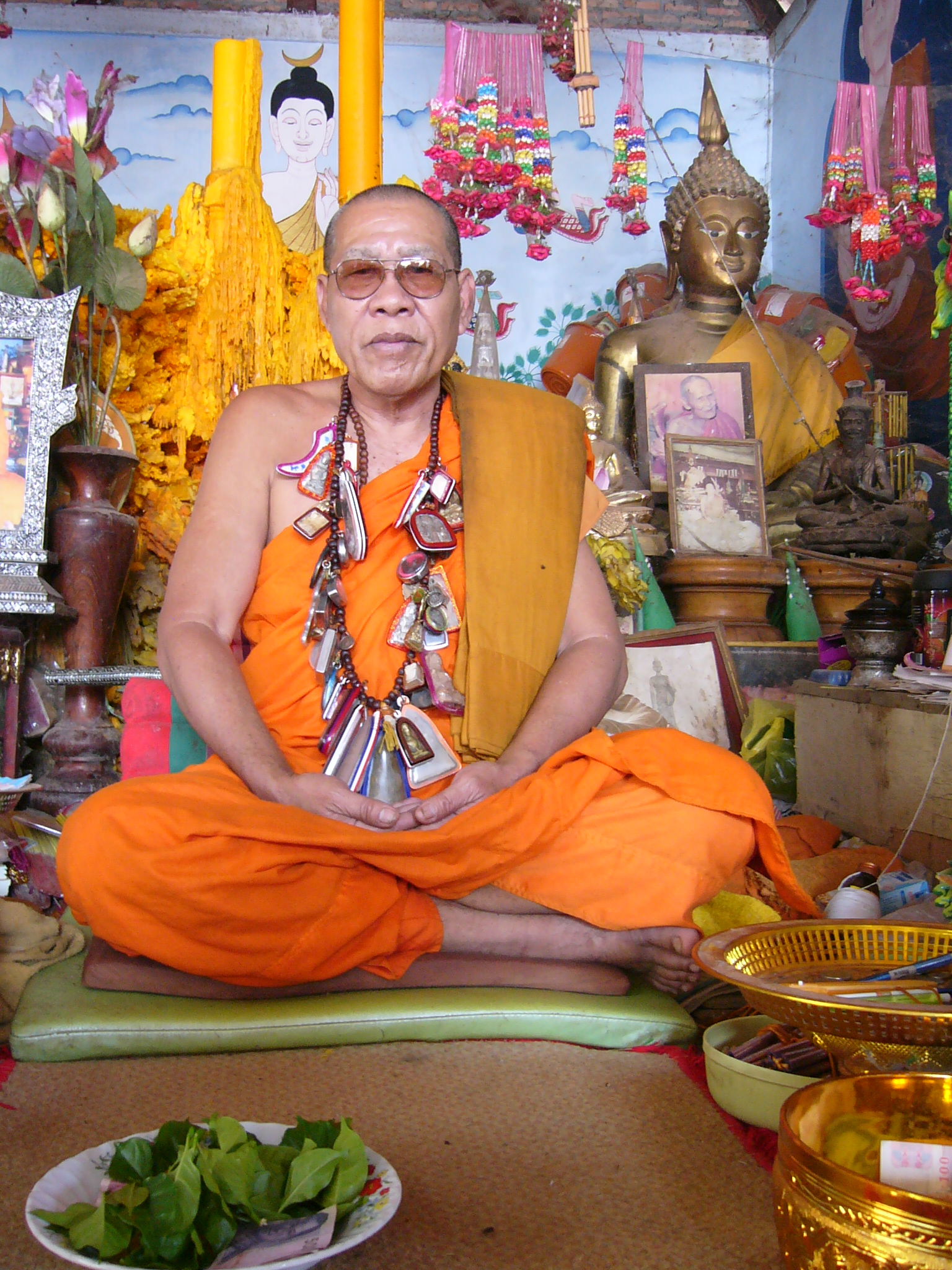
Current head of the Wat is Khun Phu Pheng.

Wat Kham Chanot (Thai: วัดคำชะโนด) is a buddhist temple near Ban Kham Chanot, Amphoe Ban Dung, Udon Thani Province in Northeastern Thailand. It is located in the Wang Nakhin area at a lake where the Nāga, a mythical large snake, is supposed to be living.

Nāga worship is one of the main issues in this small monastery. About ten monks live here permanently. It is believed that the snake has a hideaway on the island. It is connected to the other Wat premises by a bridge. The origins of the wat are located on the island.

A small zoo with turtles has been added to the monastery. Opposite of the main temple building, a permanent (rural) market for visitors is provided.

== See also ==
- List of Buddhist temples
