= Oshumare =

Rainbow serpent deity in Yoruba pantheon

- Rainbows; Serpents; Permanence; Regeneration; Rebirth
- Member of Orisha
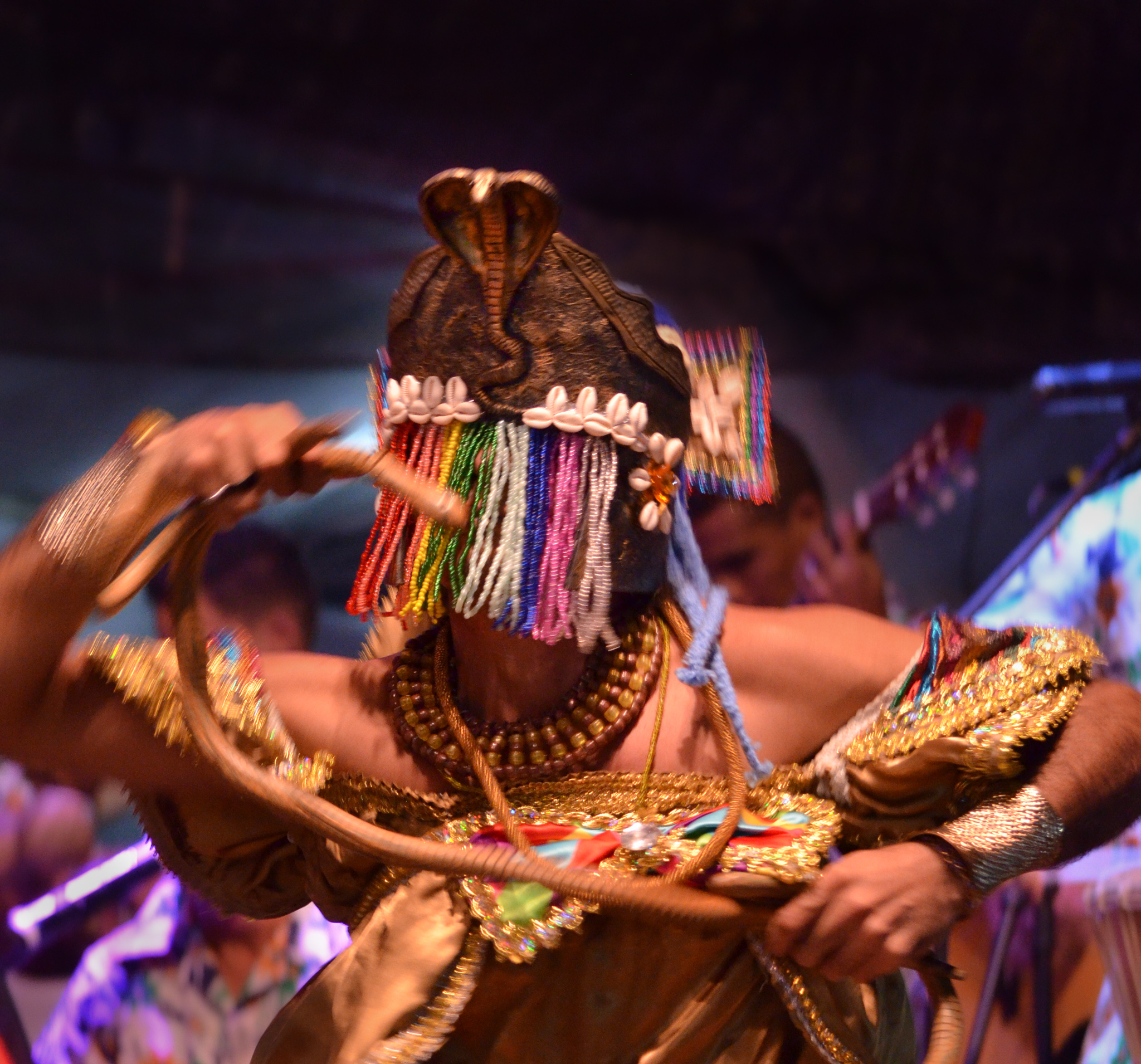
- An Umbandista dressed as Oshumare during the National Folklore Festival, Olímpia.
- Other names: Oṣumare or Oshumare; Ochumaré or Oxumaré
- Venerated in: Yoruba religion, Umbanda, Candomble, Santeria, Haitian Vodou, Folk Catholicism
- Symbol: Wealth; Rainbow; Snake (especially the Python); Drum; Gender Duality
- Color: Purple or Burgundy; the Rainbow
- Region: Yorubaland, Latin America
- Ethnic group: Yoruba

Oshumare (known as Oxumaré in Brazil or Ochumaré in Cuba/Haiti/Puerto Rico) is an Orisha. Oshumare is the divine serpent spirit of the rainbow.

"Òṣùmàrè" in the Yoruba language signifies both the intangible "rainbow" and the mythic serpent that devours its own tail. Òṣùmàrè is also symbolically represented by the python (ere), thus also referred to as a "celestial python";. There also seems to be some connection to the Yoruba celestial deity Olódùmarè, whose name might be etymologically derived from ere (snake/python). (Note: Lawal (2008), pp. 26–27, quoted and paraphrased in Odwirafo Kwesi Ra Nehem Ptah Akhan (no date) NYANKOPON and NYANKONTON - RA and RAIT, p. 15.)

A common belief of the Oshumare is that it is both male and female. It is also known as a symbol of creation, human reproduction and the link between the world of the mundane and that of the ancestors.

The Oshumare of the Yoruba is somewhat equivalent to the "Dan Aìdó-huedó" (Ayida Wedo) of the Fon people of Benin, however, even closer parallels are evident in the Brazilian orixa Oxumare which derives directly from the Yoruba orisha Oshumare, and the Haitian Iwa Damballa Aida Wedo which descends from the Fon vodun Aida Wedo.

== See also ==
- Aido Wedo
- List of Yoruba deities
- Shango
