= Tori-Gare =

Coordinates: 6.8189°N 2.1876°E

- Arrondissement and town
- Interactive map of Tori-Gare
- Country: Benin
- Department: Atlantique Department
- Commune: Tori-Bossito

Population (2002)
  - Total: 6,997
- Time zone: UTC+1 (WAT)

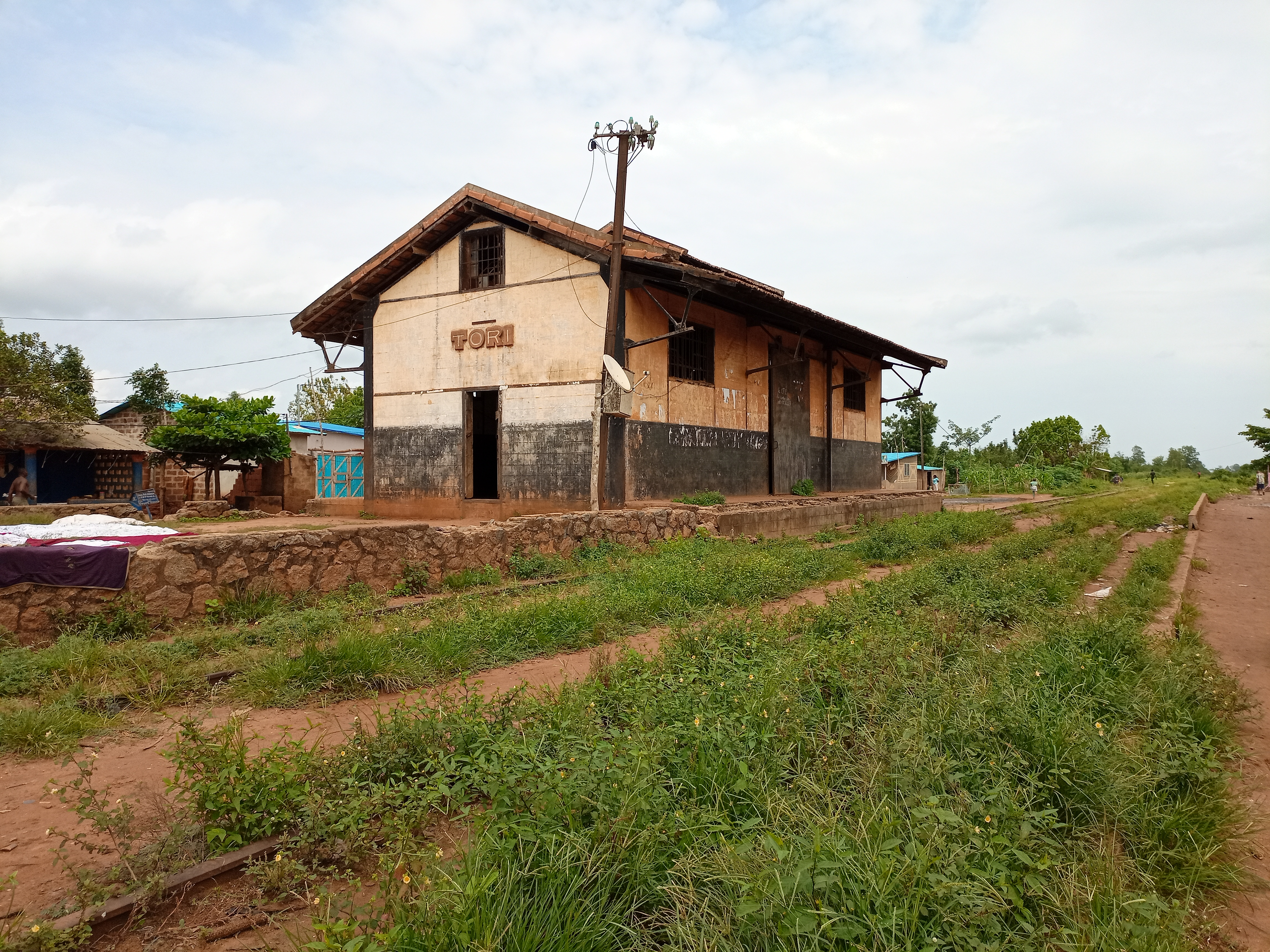
Building in Tori-Gare

Tori-Gare is a town and arrondissement in the Atlantique Department of southern Benin. It is an administrative division under the jurisdiction of the commune of Tori-Bossito. According to the population census conducted by the Institut National de la Statistique Benin on February 15, 2002, the arrondissement had a total population of 6,997.
