= World Serpent =

World Serpent or World Snake may refer to:

- Antaboga, the world serpent of traditional Javanese mythology
- Jörmungandr, also known as the Midgard Serpent, in Norse mythology
- Ouroboros, a world serpent or dragon swallowing its own tail
- Shesha, the serpent containing the universe in Hindu mythology
- World Serpent, a deity in the Dungeons & Dragons campaign setting Forgotten Realms
- World Serpent Distribution, defunct British record label and music distribution house

== See also ==
- Leviathan
