= Pierrot Barra =

Haitian Vodou artist and priest (1942–1999)

Pierrot Barra (1942–1999) was a Haitian Vodou artist and priest, who was president of a Bizango society. He was well-known for his use of diverse materials to create "Vodou Things", which functioned as charms or altars for the Vodou religion.

With his wife Marie Cassaise, Barra worked from the Iron Market of Port-au-Prince, where he made "Vodou repositories from toys, fabric, glass, sequins, goats' horns, rosaries, costume jewelry, compact mirrors, Christmas ornaments, crucifixes, and other discarded materials." His Afro-Cuban dolls sold well, bought by locals to protect themselves. He often used discarded American toys and dolls as the basis of his works, embellishing them with "charms, glitter, sequins, beads, and crosses that were originally intended for altars." The most notable aspect of his works is rubber baby dolls.

His works have been featured in shows in Port-au-Prince, New York, Baltimore, New Orleans, Chicago, San Francisco, and Madrid, and he is the only Haitian artist to which an entire book is dedicated (Vodou Things: The Art of Pierrot Barra and Marie Cassaise by Donald J. Cosentino).

== Biography ==
Some biographers believe Pierrot Barra was born in 1937, while others contend it was 1942; despite the disagreement around the specific date of his birth, it is known for certain that he was born in a district of Port-au-Prince called Bel Air. His mother, a mambo or Vodou priestess, made and sold Vodou flags at the Iron Market in Port-au-Prince. Barra assisted his mother in her work and business for thirty years, and it was from her that he gained the necessary skills to begin making his own art.

At the age of thirteen, he became an oungan, or Vodou priest. He was also a part of the Bizango secret society, reaching one of its highest ranks of president. While the Bizango society is a feared and controversial force among the Haitian people, Barra claimed he was a member for protection.

Pierrot Barra and Marie Cassaise, also a Vodou priestess, were married in 1971 and have been creating art together since then. Together, the two had several children, most notably Roland and Franz, who helped create pieces when Barra’s popularity grew in the late 1990s. Barra also had between eight and ten other wives as well, with whom he had between twenty and thirty children. Barra died on July 31, 1999, due to heart failure. His funeral was attended by many, including art historians, customers, and foreigners who admired his work. In his stead, Marie Cassaise and his sons Roland and Franz continue to work in his style.

== Works ==
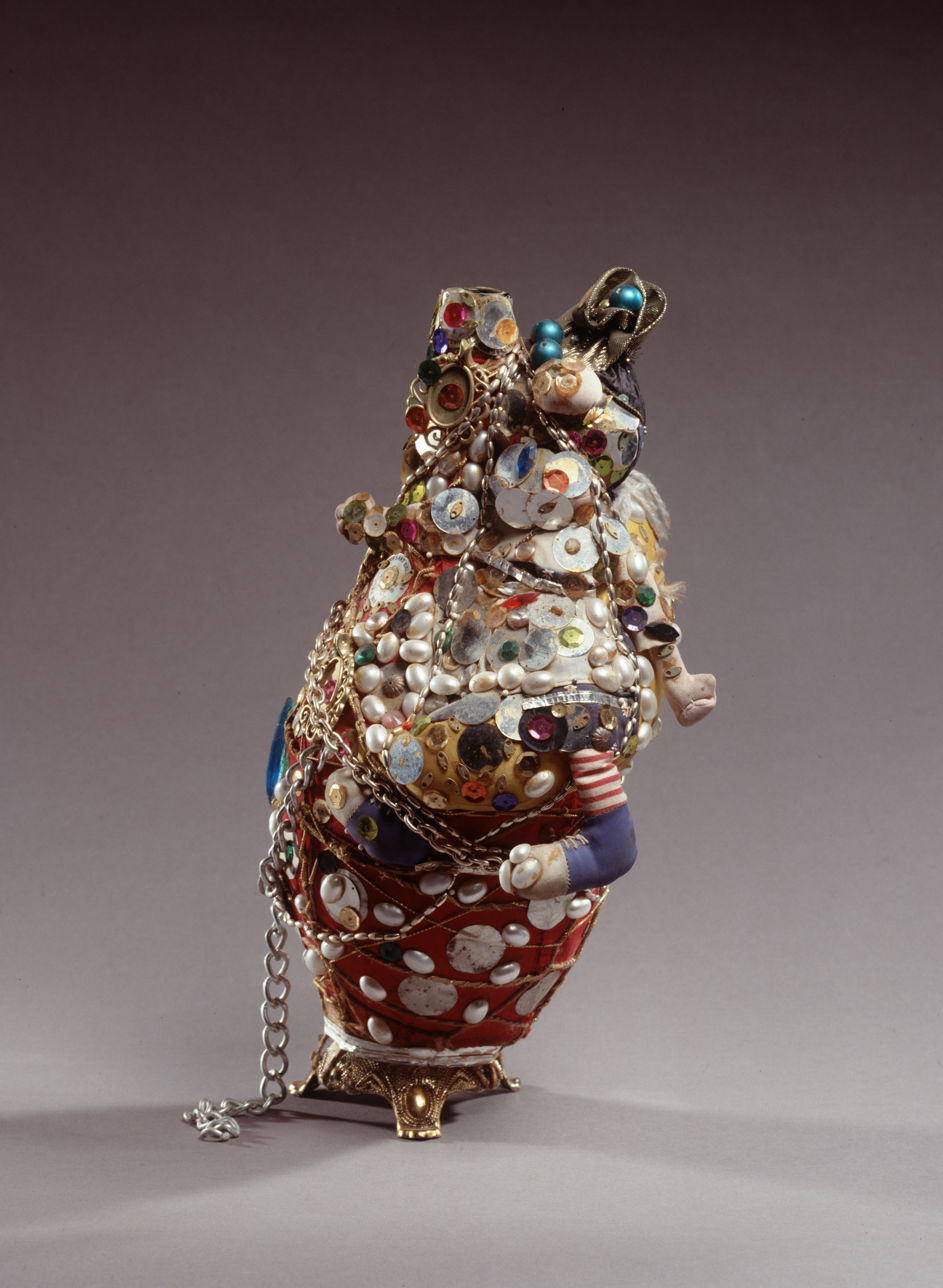
A paquet congo created by Pierrot Barra (National Museum of World Cultures)

Pierrot Barra sold his work, what he calls "Vodou Things", from a stall in the Iron Market in Port-au-Prince, Haiti. It is unknown whether Barra ever considered his pieces fine art. While Marie Cassaise is frequently credited with helping him create his work, there is very little written about her or how little or how much she contributed to the process.

Many of Barra’s pieces can be considered gads, very personal items imbued with spiritual power to benefit its owner, or reposwa, items that contains a Haitian Vodou spirit, known as a lwa or a djab (devil), instead of altars or altar pieces. Like other Haitian Vodou art, Barra’s work is filled with shiny cloth, sequins, symbols associated with the different Haitian spirits or lwa, and imagery from Catholicism. This is because West African slaves brought to Haiti incorporated Catholicism into their belief system in order to gain understanding and power over their French white masters, creating what is now known as Haitian Vodou. Sequins and shimmery elements are used because they attract the Vodou lwa, in some cases for preparation for a Vodou ritual or possession (known as "riding").

The main guiding lwa of Barra’s life and art, his met tet, are St. Jacques Majeur, Ezili Danto, Ogou Badagri, and Agwe. In his dreams, sometimes these lwa commanded him to make work and other times he used the dreams for inspiration for pieces. Sometimes, the lwa would first appear to him as creatures with a hundred heads, but as he communicated more with them, he claimed they began to look like average people. In these dreams, Barra would also see the customer who would buy the piece; he claimed each piece was for a specific person.

Barra’s works rely heavily on accumulation, a technique heavily used in Haitian and Vodou art and brought over from Africa. The changing nature of the lwa are why they love so many different kinds of materials and why so many different materials are used for sculptures, altars, and other reverent pieces. Some of his works contain pwen, or points of spiritual power allowing the spirit world to seep into the world of flesh. The most iconic part of Barra’s works are the plastic dolls, which some scholars believe is his greatest contribution to Haitian art and sculpture. These dolls are not like the "voodoo" dolls of New Orleans, nor are they stuck with pins; rather they function as messengers to the spirits, represent humans or lwa, or serve in place of humans for punishment or channeling magic. He claimed the materials for his pieces were always brought to him by people through the lwa as described to him in a dream, although some believe he had runners that got the materials for him.

Donald Cosentino coined the term "mojo board" to describe Barra’s work that developed in the middle of his artistic career, which is a sculpture with the pieces affixed to a cloth-covered board. This is the genre of sculpture for which Barra is most well-known.

Barra’s work has been described as having an Antillean Aesthetic, but also being postmodern. His art is not considered traditional (although it contains traditional Vodou elements, such as sequins), but it is easily recognizable by Vodou practitioners. Even within the ever-changing culture of Vodou and Vodou art, Barra’s work has been called "revolutionary". Present in Barra’s work are symbols of the Bizango spirits, a sect of the Vodou lwa pantheon.

== Public collections ==
- Fowler Museum, Los Angeles, California
- Waterloo Center for the Arts, Waterloo, Iowa
- Nottingham Contemporary Art Centre, Nottingham, England

== Principle exhibitions ==
- 1996 - Sacred Arts of Haitian Vodou, Center for the Fine Arts, Miami, Florida
- 2012 - In Extremis: Death and Life in 21st-Century Haitian Art, Fowler Museum, Los Angeles, California
- 2012 - Kafou: Haiti, Art & Vodou, Nottingham Contemporary, Nottingham, England
- 2014 - Haiti: Two Centuries of Art and Creativity, Grand Palais, Paris, France

== Additional Sources ==
- Brown, Karen McCarthy. "Mama Lola and the Ezilis: Themes of Mothering and Loving in Haitian Vodou". In Unspoken Worlds: Women’s Religious Lives, edited by Nancy Auer Falk and Rita M. Gross, 235-45. Cengage Learning: 2000.
