= Baron La Croix =

Deity

- Death, obscenity, lust, sexuality, vengeance
- Venerated in: Haitian Vodou, Louisiana Voodoo, Folk Catholicism
- Attributes: Black tailcoat and top hat, cane, cigar, dark glasses

Baron La Croix (Haitian Creole: Bawon Lakwa) is one of the Gede, a lwa of the dead and sexuality, along with Baron Samedi and Baron Cimetière in Vodou. He is syncretized with Saint Expeditus. Baron La Croix is also known as Azagon Lacroix.

== Worship ==
Baron La Croix is often seen wearing a black tailcoat and carrying an elaborate cane and is considered suave and sophisticated, cultured and debonair. He has an existential philosophy about death, finding death's reason for being both humorous and absurd. Baron La Croix is the extreme expression of individuality and offers the reminder of delighting in life's pleasures. Baron La Croix (also called Bawon Lakwa) accepts the colors purple and black. He enjoys two servings of coffee: one sweetened with only sugar and one bitter. He also accepts rum infused with 21 scotch bonnet peppers, or any hot pepper, as long as it equates to 21 when presenting the offering; when presenting the rum and hot peppers, the bottle is usually left open. He also eats hot peppers by themselves as an offering. Bawon Lakwa takes incense and cigarettes as offerings as well. While making a petition to him, he enjoys his cigarettes lit and on the altar. Baron Lakwa's associated day of the week is Monday.
