= Paquet congo =

Haitian spiritual objects

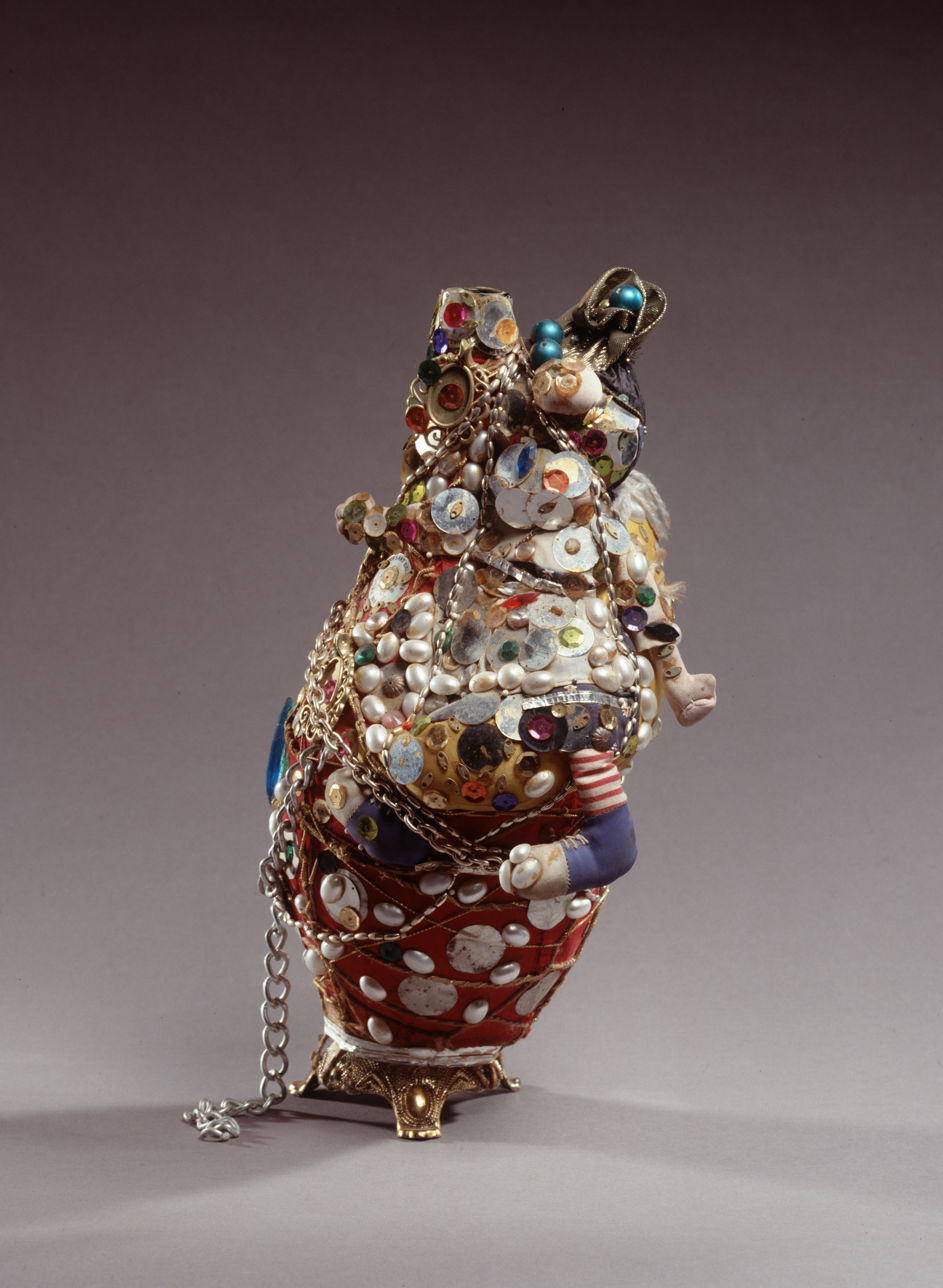
A paquet congo created by Pierrot Barra (National Museum of World Cultures)

Paquet congo (Haitian Creole: Paket kongo) are Haitian spiritual objects made by vodou priests and priestesses (houngans and mambos) during ceremonies. Their name comes from the ancient Kongo Kingdom in Africa, where similar objects called nikisi wambi are found.

Kongolese nkisi uses materials different from those of the Haitian paquet; however, a paquet is a collection of magical ingredients—herbs, earth, and vegetable matter—wrapped in fabric and decorated with feathers, ribbons, and sequins.

Paquet congo are said to have the power of “heating” or activating the loa. Hence the term pwen cho (hot point) sometimes used to refer to them. Paquet serve as power objects and are kept on vodou altars and used in healing ceremonies. They are also used as protective amulets in people’s homes, bringing health, wealth and happiness.

Their efficacy supposedly depends on careful wrapping - seven or nine times – symbolic of an umbilical cord connecting the charm to the universe. Indeed, their appearance roughly resembles that of a human body (some have arms), and their colors and ornamentation are sometimes, but not always, symbolic of a specific loa.
