= Bizango =

Secret society in Haiti

Three macandals (villagers in secret societies associated with François Mackandal) turning a man into a zombie (Hector Hyppolite).

The Bizango are secret societies active in Haiti. Many of their practices are associated with Haitian Vodou.

They have been termed "one of the most important of the secret societies of Vodou". Bizango groups are widespread throughout Haiti, and play an important role as arbiters in peasant social life.

The anthropologist Wade Davis reported that the Bizango were involved in poisoning individuals and then providing them with an antidote to leave them in a pliant state, which he associated with zombification. In Davis' view, this was how the Bizango enforced their social codes against those who transgressed them. The Bizango's practice of capturing zombis is often taken as evidence of these societies' malevolent nature.

In Haitian folklore, a recurring fear is that the Bizango can transform themselves into dogs or other animals, in which form they walk the streets at night.

== See also ==
- Haitian culture
