= Haitian Vodou =

Religion from Haiti

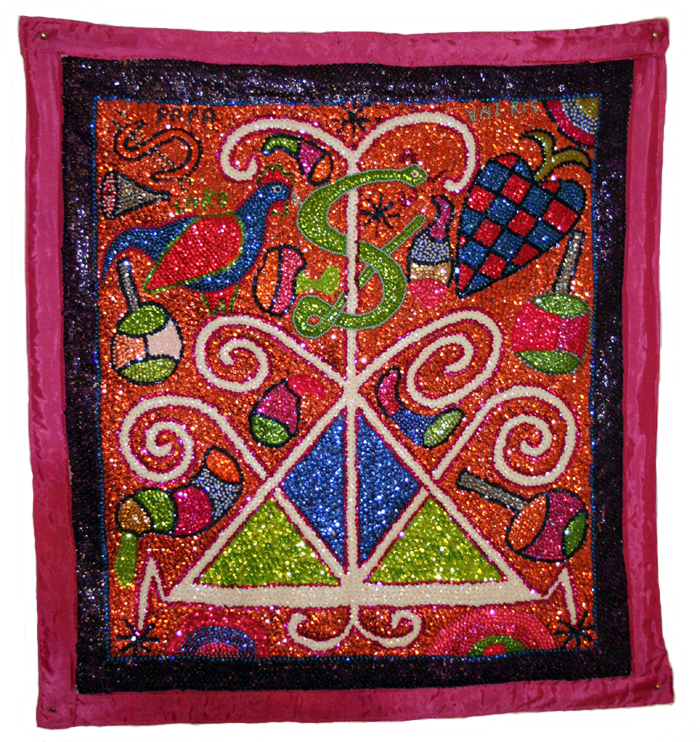
A sequined drapo flag, by Haitian artist Georges Valris, depicting the vèvè symbol of the lwa Loko Atison; these symbols play an important role in Vodou ritual.

Haitian Vodou (Note: "Vodou" is the customary spelling of a word meaning "the traditional religion of the Haitian people". Alternative spellings have included Voodoo /ˈvuːduː/ Vaudou /ˈvoʊduː/; Vodun /ˈvoʊduː/; Vodoun /ˈvoʊduːn/; Vodu /ˈvoʊduː/, or Vaudoux /ˈvoʊduː/) (/ˈvoʊduː/) is an African diasporic religion that developed in Haiti between the 16th and 19th centuries. It arose through a process of syncretism between several traditional religions of West and Central Africa and Catholicism. There is no central authority in control of the religion and much diversity exists among practitioners, who are known as Vodouists in English.

Vodou teaches the existence of a transcendent creator divinity, Bondye, under whom are spirits known as lwa. These lwa typically derive their names from traditional West and Central African deities, are equated with Catholic saints, and divide into groups called nanchon ("nations"), most notably the Rada and the Petwo. This theology has been labelled both monotheistic and polytheistic. Vodouists will often be initiated into an ounfò (temple), run by an oungan (priest) or manbo (priestess), through which group ceremonies are conducted. Alternatively, Vodou is also practised within family groups or in secret societies like the Bizango. Adherents seek the aid of the lwa, and spirits of the dead, by offering them fruit, liquor, and sacrificed animals. Communication with the lwa is sought through divination and through a key ritual in which Vodouists drum, sing, and dance to encourage a lwa to temporarily possess the dancers. Healing rituals and the preparation of herbal remedies and talismans also play a prominent role.

Vodou developed among Afro-Haitian communities amid the Atlantic slave trade of the 16th to 19th centuries. Its structure arose from the blending of the traditional religions of those enslaved West and Central Africans brought to the island of Hispaniola, among them Kongo, Fon, and Yoruba. There, it absorbed influences from the culture of the French colonialists who controlled the colony of Saint-Domingue, most notably Roman Catholicism but also Freemasonry. Many Vodouists were involved in the Haitian Revolution of 1791 to 1801 which overthrew the French colonial government, abolished slavery, and transformed Saint-Domingue into the Haitian republic. The Catholic Church left for several decades following the Revolution, allowing Vodou to become Haiti's dominant religion. In the 20th century, growing emigration spread Vodou abroad. The late 20th century saw growing links between Vodou and related traditions in West Africa and the Americas, such as Cuban Santería and Brazilian Candomblé, while some practitioners influenced by the Négritude movement attempted to remove Catholic influences.

Most Haitians practice both Vodou and Catholicism, seeing no contradiction in pursuing the two systems simultaneously. Smaller Vodouist communities exist elsewhere, especially among Haitian diasporas in Cuba and the United States. Both in Haiti and abroad Vodou has spread beyond its Afro-Haitian origins and is practiced by individuals of various ethnicities. Having faced much criticism through its history, Vodou has been described as one of the world's most misunderstood religions.

== Definitions and terminology ==
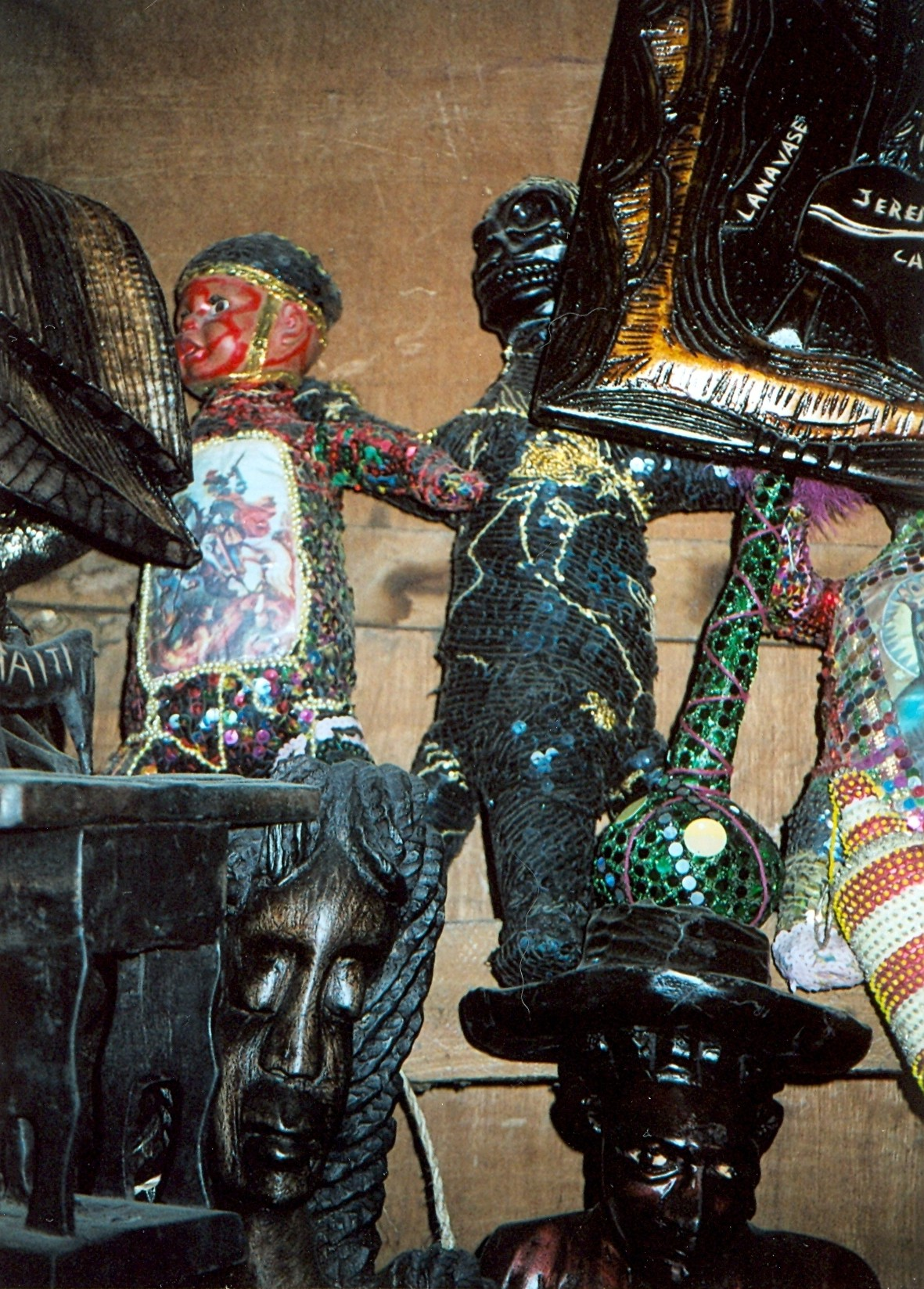
Vodou paraphernalia for sale at the Marché de Fer (Iron Market) in Port-au-Prince, Haiti

Vodou is a religion, sometimes considered Haiti's "national religion". Its main structure derives from the West and Central African traditional religions brought to Haiti by enslaved Africans between the 16th and 19th centuries, especially those of the Fon and Bakongo peoples. On the island, these African religions mixed with the iconography of European-derived traditions like Roman Catholicism and Freemasonry, taking the form of Vodou around the mid-18th century. In this, Vodou is syncretic, a symbiosis, or a product of creolization.

As formed in Haiti, Vodou represented "a new religion", "a creolized New World system", which differed in many ways from African traditional religions. The scholar Leslie Desmangles therefore called it an "African-derived tradition", Ina J. Fandrich termed it a "neo-African religion", and Markel Thylefors an "Afro-Latin American religion". Several other African diasporic religions from the Americas formed in a similar way, and owing to their shared origins in West African traditional religion, Vodou has been characterized as a "sister religion" of Cuban Santería and Brazilian Candomblé.

Vodou has no central institutional authority, no single leader, and no developed body of doctrine. It has no orthodoxy, no central liturgy, and no formal creed. Developing over several centuries, it has changed over time. It displays variation at both the regional and local level—including variation between Haiti and the Haitian diaspora—as well as among different congregations. It is practiced domestically, by families on their land, but also by congregations meeting at communal temples.

In Haitian culture, religions are not generally deemed wholly autonomous. Many Haitians practice both Vodou and Roman Catholicism, with Vodouists usually considering themselves Roman Catholics. In Haiti, some Vodouists have also practiced Protestantism, Mormonism, or Freemasonry; in Cuba they have involved themselves in Santería, and in the United States with modern Paganism. Vodou has also absorbed elements from other contexts; in Cuba, some Vodouists have adopted elements from Spiritism. Influenced by the Négritude movement, other Vodouists have sought to remove Roman Catholic and other European influences from their practice of Vodou.

=== Terminology ===
In English, Vodou's practitioners are termed Vodouists; in French, they are Vodouisants, and in Haitian Creole, Vodouyizan. Another term for adherents is sèvitè (serviteurs, "devotees"), reflecting their self-description as people who sèvi lwa ("serve the lwa"), the supernatural beings that are central to Vodou.

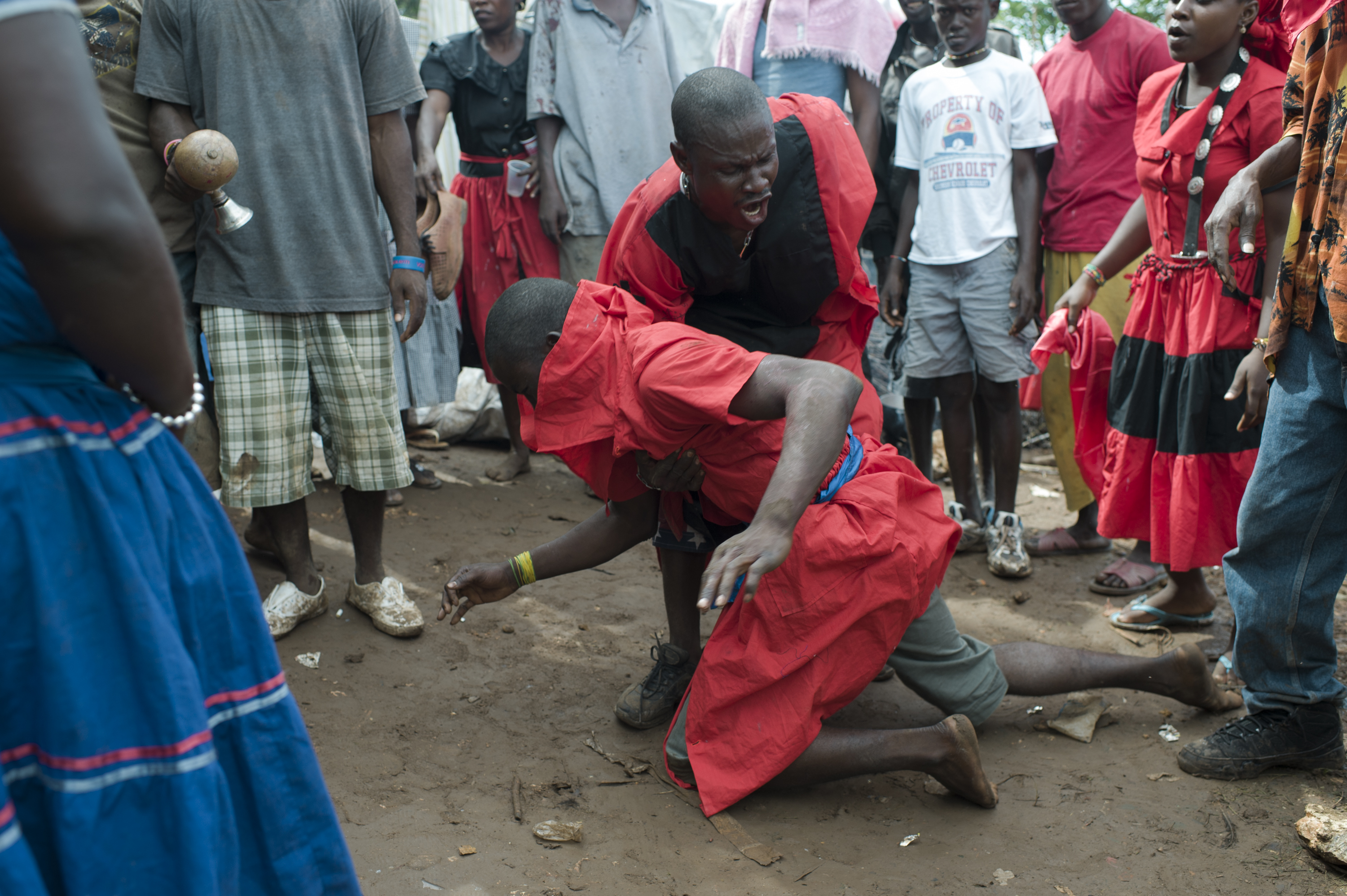
An oungan (Vodou priest) with another practitioner at a ceremony in Haiti in 2011

Many words used in the religion derive from the Fon language of West Africa; this includes the word Vodou itself. First recorded in the 1658 Doctrina Christiana, the Fon word Vôdoun was used in the West African kingdom of Dahomey to signify a spirit or deity. In Haitian Creole, Vodou came to designate a specific style of dance and drumming, before outsiders to the religion adopted it as a generic term for Afro-Haitian religion. The word Vodou now encompasses "a variety of Haiti's African-derived religious traditions and practices", incorporating "a bundle of practices that practitioners themselves do not aggregate". Vodou is thus a term primarily used by scholars and outsiders to the religion; many practitioners describe their tradition as Ginen, denoting a moral philosophy and code regarding how to live and serve the spirits.

Vodou is the common spelling for the religion used by scholars, official Haitian Creole orthography, and the United States Library of Congress. Some scholars prefer the spellings Vodoun, Voudoun, or Vodun, while in French the spellings vaudou or vaudoux also appear. The spelling Voodoo, once common, is now generally avoided by practitioners and scholars when referring to the Haitian religion. This is both to avoid confusion with Louisiana Voodoo, a related but distinct tradition, and to distinguish it from the negative connotations that the term Voodoo has in Western popular culture.

== Beliefs ==
=== Bondye and the lwa ===
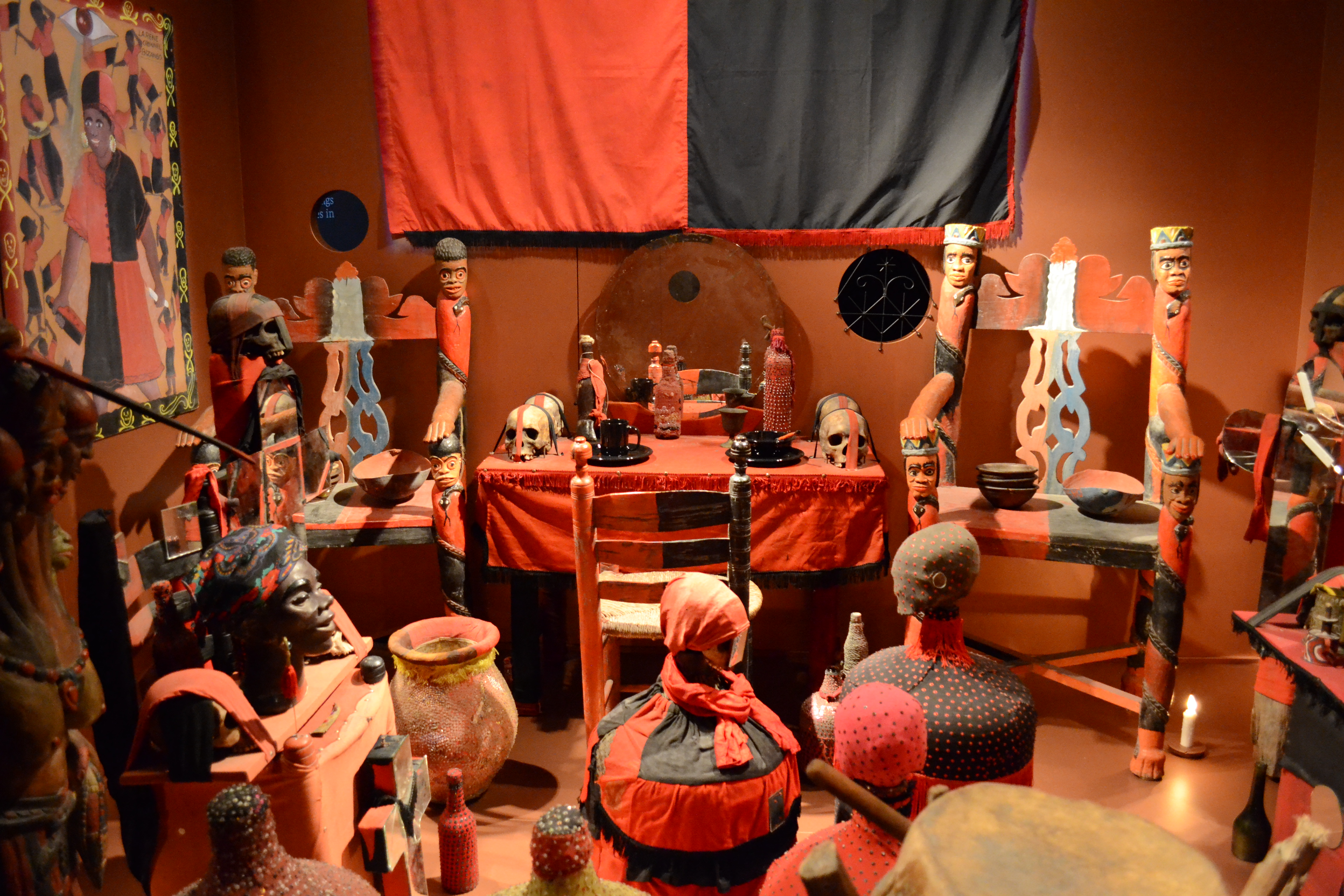
A selection of ritual items used in Vodou practice on display in the Canadian Museum of Civilization

Vodou is monotheistic, teaching the existence of a single supreme God. This entity is called Bondye or Bonié, a name deriving from the French term Bon Dieu ("Good God"). Another name for this God—borrowed from Freemasonry—is the Gran Mèt. For Vodouists, Bondye is the ultimate source of power, the creator of the universe, and the maintainer of cosmic order. Haitians frequently use the phrase si Bondye vle ("if Bondye wishes"), suggesting a belief that all things occur in accordance with this divinity's will. Vodouists regard Bondye as being transcendent and remote; as the God is uninvolved in human affairs, they see little point in approaching it directly. While Vodouists often equate Bondye with the Christian God, Vodou does not incorporate belief in a powerful antagonist that opposes the supreme being akin to the Christian Satan.

Vodou has also been characterized as polytheistic. It teaches the existence of beings called the lwa, a term varyingly translated into English as "spirits", "gods", or "geniuses". These lwa are also known as the mystères, anges, saints, and les invisibles, and are sometimes equated with the angels of Christian cosmology. Vodou teaches that there are over a thousand lwa, although certain ones are especially popular. Serving as Bondye's intermediaries, they communicate with humans through dreams or direct spirit possession. Each lwa has its own personality, and is associated with specific colors, days of the week, and objects. Although there are exceptions, most lwa derive their names from the Fon and Yoruba languages and originated as deities venerated in West or Central Africa. New lwa are nevertheless added to the pantheon, with both talismans and humans thought capable of becoming lwa, in the latter case through their strength of personality or power. Vodouists often believe the lwa live in rivers or the sea, or alternatively in Ginen, a term encompassing a generalized understanding of Africa as the ancestral land of the Haitian people.

Vodouists believe that everyone connects to a specific lwa, their mèt tèt ("master of the head"), who informs that individual's personality. Vodou holds that the identity of a person's tutelary lwa can be identified through divination or by consulting lwa when they possess other humans. Some of the religion's priests and priestesses are deemed to have "the gift of eyes", capable of seeing the identity of a person's tutelary lwa. Certain lwa are also linked to human family lineages. Vodouists believe the lwa can offer help, protection, and counsel in return for ritual service. The lwa can be either loyal or capricious in their dealings with their devotees; they are easily offended, for instance if offered food they dislike. When angered, the lwa are believed to remove their protection from their devotees, or to inflict misfortune, illness, or madness. These spirits are not considered moral exemplars for practitioners to imitate.

==== The nanchon ====
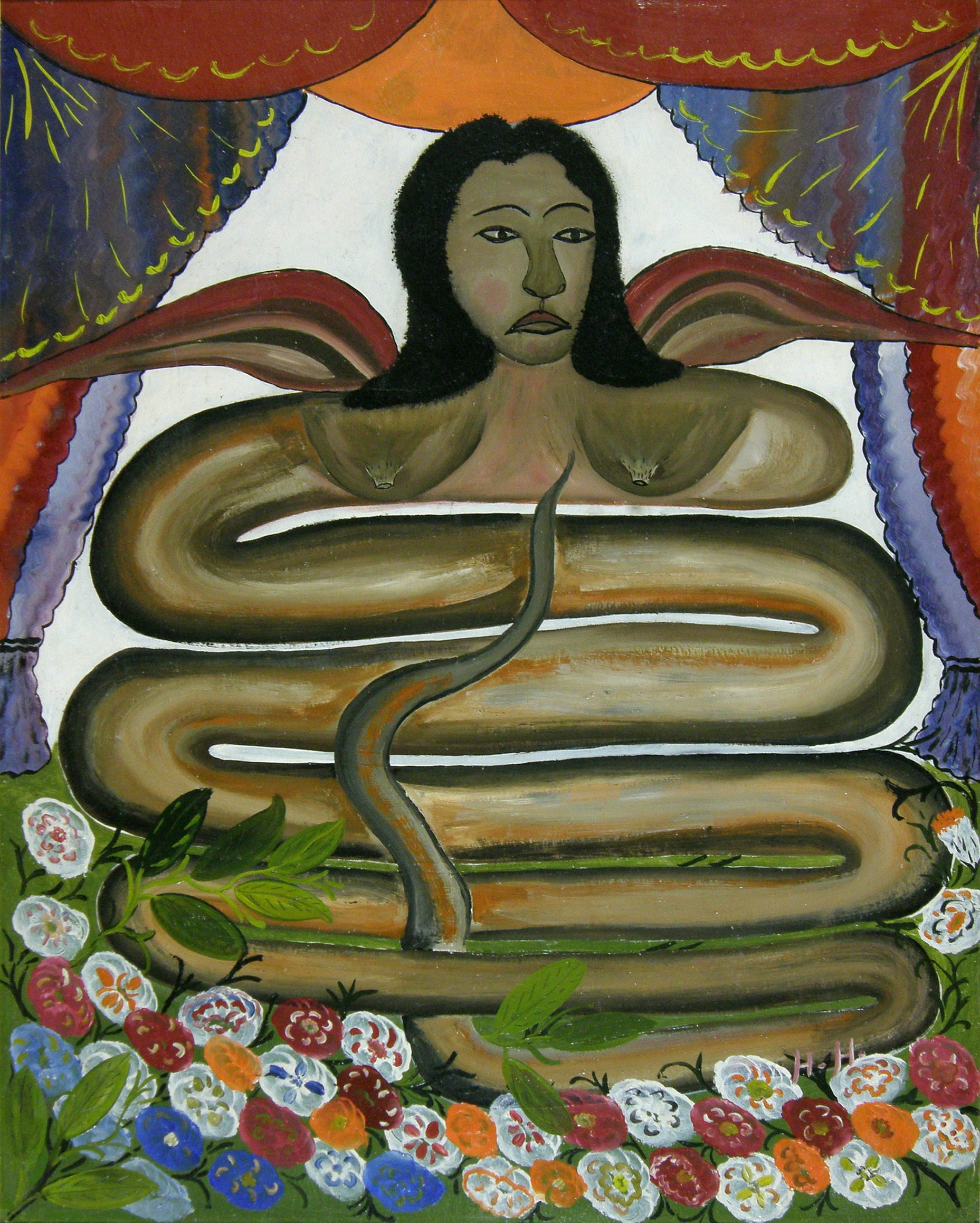
A painting of the lwa Danbala, a serpent, by Haitian artist Hector Hyppolite. Hyppolite was himself an oungan, or Vodou priest.

The lwa divide into nanchon or "nations". This classificatory system derives from the way in which enslaved Africans were divided into "nations" upon their arrival in Haiti, usually based on their African port of departure rather than their ethno-cultural identity. The term fanmi (family) is sometimes used synonymously with nanchon or alternatively as a sub-division of the latter category. It is often claimed that there are 17 nanchon, of which the Rada and the Petwo are the largest and most dominant.

The Rada lwa are seen as being 'cool', the Petwo lwa as 'hot'. This means that the Rada are dous, or sweet-tempered, while the Petwo are lwa cho, indicating that they can be forceful or violent and are associated with fire. Whereas the Rada are generally righteous, their Petwo counterparts are more morally ambiguous and associated with issues like money. The Rada owe more to Dahomeyan and Yoruba influences; their name probably comes from Arada, a city in the Dahomey kingdom. The Petwo derive largely from Kongo religion, although also exhibit Dahomeyan and creolised influences. Some lwa exist andezo or en deux eaux ("in two waters") and are served in both Rada and Petwo rituals.

In Rada ceremonies, the first lwa saluted is Papa Legba. Depicted as a feeble old man wearing rags and using a crutch, Papa Legba is the protector of gates and fences and thus of the home, as well as of roads, paths, and crossroads. In Petwo rites, the first lwa invoked is usually Mèt Kalfou. The second lwa usually greeted are the Marasa or sacred twins. In Vodou, every nanchon has its own Marasa, reflecting a belief that twins have special powers. Another important lwa is Agwe, also known as Agwe-taroyo, who is associated with aquatic life and protects ships and fishermen. Agwe rules the sea with his consort, La Sirène. She is a mermaid, and is sometimes described as Èzili of the Waters because she brings good luck and wealth from the sea. Also bearing the name Èzili is Èzili Freda or Erzuli Freda, the lwa of love and luxury who personifies feminine beauty and grace, and Ezili Dantor, who takes the form of a peasant woman.

A vèvè pattern designed to invoke Baron Samedi, the chief of the Gede lwa

Azaka is the lwa of crops and agriculture, usually addressed as "Papa" or "Cousin". His consort is the female lwa Kouzinn. Loco is the lwa of vegetation, and because he is seen to give healing properties to various plant species is considered the lwa of healing. Ogou is a warrior lwa, associated with weapons. Sogbo is a lwa associated with lightning, while his companion, Bade, is associated with the wind. Danbala is a serpent lwa associated with water, frequenting rivers, springs, and marshes; he is one of the most popular deities in the pantheon. Danbala and his consort Ayida-Weddo are often depicted as a pair of intertwining snakes. Guarding fountains and marshes are spirits called the Simbi.

Usually seen as a fanmi rather than a nanchon, the Gede are associated with the realm of the dead. The head of the family is Baron Samedi ("Baron Saturday"); he is associated with the phallus, the skull, and the graveyard cross, the latter used to highlight his presence in a Haitian cemetery. His consort is Gran Brigit, who has authority over cemeteries and is mother to many of the other Gede. The Gede regularly satirise the ruling authorities, and are welcomed to rituals as they are thought to bring merriment. The Gede's symbol is an erect penis, the banda dance associated with them involves sexual-style thrusting, and those possessed by these lwa typically make sexual innuendos.

==== The lwa and the saints ====
Most lwa are associated with specific Roman Catholic saints. These particular links rely on analogies between the respective functions of these figures; Azaka, the lwa of agriculture, is for instance associated with Saint Isidore the farmer. Similarly, as the "key" to the spirit world, Papa Legba is typically associated with Saint Peter, who traditionally holds keys in Roman Catholic imagery. The lwa of love and luxury, Èzili Freda, is associated with Mater Dolorosa. Danbala the serpent is often equated with Saint Patrick, who is traditionally depicted with snakes, or with Moses, whose staff turned into serpents according to the Book of Exodus. The Marasa, or sacred twins, are typically equated with the twin saints Cosmas and Damian.

Vodouists may originally have adopted the Roman Catholic saints to conceal lwa worship when the latter was illegal during the colonial period. However, by at least the late 20th century, many Vodouists expressed genuine devotion to the Roman Catholic saints, with the scholar Marc A. Christophe stating that most modern Vodouists genuinely see the saints and lwa as one, reflecting Vodou's "all-inclusive and harmonizing characteristics". Many Vodouists possess chromolithographic prints of the saints, while images of these figures can be found on temple walls, and on the drapo flags used in Vodou ritual. Vodouists also often adopt and reinterpret biblical stories and theorise about the nature of Jesus of Nazareth. Catholic and Vodou identity is sufficiently intertwined that a Haitian proverb maintains that "pou sevi lwa yo se pou'w bon katolik" ("you have to be a good Catholic to serve the spirits").

=== Soul and afterlife ===
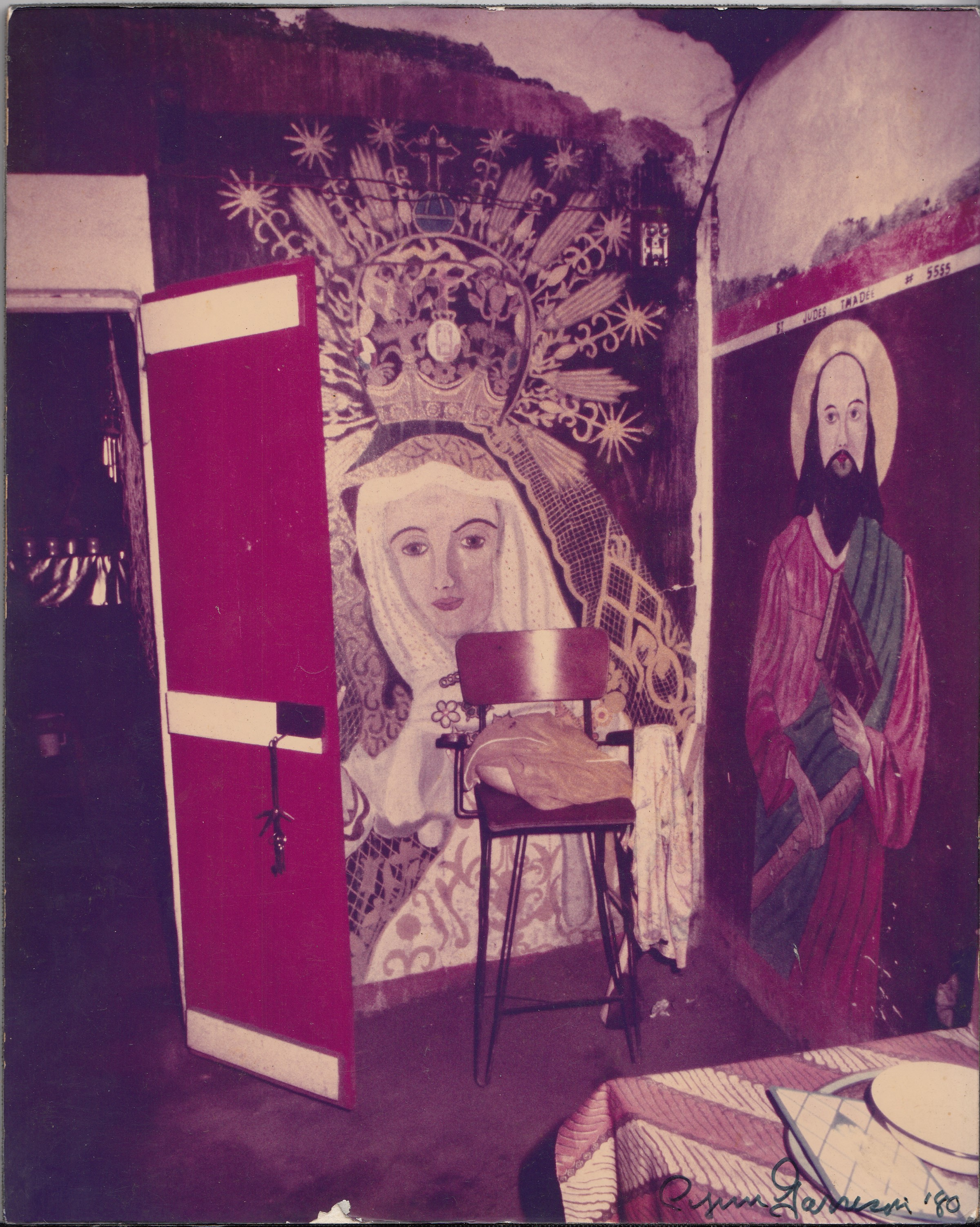
A Vodou temple in Croix des Mission, Haiti, photographed in 1980; images of Roman Catholic saints are visible on the walls.

Vodou holds that Bondye created humanity in its image, fashioning humans from water and clay. It teaches the existence of a soul, usually called the nanm, or sometimes the espri, which is divided in two parts. One of these is the ti bonnanj ("little good angel"), representing the conscience that allows an individual to engage in self-reflection and self-criticism. The other part is the gwo bonnanj ("big good angel") and this constitutes the psyche, source of memory, intelligence, and personhood. Both parts reside within an individual's head, although the gwo bonnanj can leave to travel while a person sleeps.

Vodou holds that Bondye has preordained the time of everyone's death. It does not teach the existence of an afterlife realm akin to the Christian heaven and hell; instead, a common belief is that at bodily death, the gwo bonnanj join the Ginen, or ancestral spirits, while the ti bonnanj faces judgement before Bondye. This idea of judgement is more common in urban areas, having been influenced by Roman Catholicism, while in the Haitian mountains it is more common for Vodouists to believe that the ti bonnanj dissolves into the navel of the earth nine days after death.

The land of the Ginen is often identified as being beneath the sea, under the earth, or above the sky. Some Vodouists believe that the gwo bonnanj stays in the land of the Ginen for a year and a day before being absorbed into the Gede family, however Vodouists usually distinguish the spirits of the dead from the Gede proper. Vodou also teaches that the dead continue to participate in human affairs; these spirits often complain of suffering from hunger, cold, and damp, and thus request sacrifices from the living.

=== Morality, ethics, and gender roles ===
Vodou ethics correspond to its sense of cosmological order; acts that reinforce Bondye's power are deemed good, while those that undermine it are bad. A belief in the interdependence of things informs Vodou ethics, with there being no binary division between good and evil. Central to Vodou and its moral approach is the reciprocal relationship that practitioners establish with the lwa. For Vodouists, virtue is maintained by ensuring a responsible relationship with these spirits, and a moral person is one who lives in tune with their own character and that of their tutelary lwa.

A vèvè pattern designed to invoke Papa Legba, one of the main lwa spirits worshipped in Haitian Vodou

Permeating every aspect of its adherent's lives, Vodou reflects everyday concerns, focusing on mitigating illness and misfortune. It offers no prescriptive code of ethics. Rather than being rule-based, Vodou morality is contextual to the situation; doing what one needs to in order to survive is considered a high ethic. Certain acts are, however, often thought bad, such as maji, the use of supernatural powers for self-serving and malevolent ends. The term is quite flexible; maji is usually used to denigrate other Vodouists, although some practitioners employ it as a self-descriptor for Petwo rites.

Vodou promotes a belief in destiny, although individuals are still deemed to have freedom of choice. This view of destiny has been interpreted as encouraging a fatalistic outlook, something that the religion's critics, especially from Christian backgrounds, argue discourages Vodouists from improving their society. This has been extended into an argument that Vodou is responsible for Haiti's poverty, a view that has been accused of being rooted in European colonial prejudices towards Africans.

The extended family is important in Haitian society, with Vodou reinforcing family ties, and emphasising respect for the elderly. Although there are accounts of male Vodou priests mistreating their female followers, the religion offers women the opportunity for leadership and moral authority. Vodou is also sympathetic to gay people; many gay and bisexual individuals are Vodou priests and priestesses, and some temple congregations are largely gay. Some Vodouists argue that the lwa determine a person's sexual orientation, while forms of Èzili are seen as the patron of masisi (gay men), and Èzili Dantò is sometimes regarded as a lesbian.

== Practices ==
The anthropologist Alfred Métraux described Vodou as "a practical and utilitarian religion". Its practices largely revolve around interactions with the lwa, and incorporate song, drumming, dance, prayer, spirit possession, and animal sacrifice. Practitioners gather together for sèvices (services) in which they commune with the lwa. Ceremonies for a particular lwa often coincide with the feast day of the Roman Catholic saint which that lwa is associated with. The mastery of ritual forms is considered imperative in Vodou. The purpose of ritual is to echofe ("heat things up"), thus bringing about change, whether that be to remove barriers or to facilitate healing. Ritual activities are often termed travay (work).

Secrecy is important in Vodou. It is an initiatory tradition, operating through a system of graded induction or initiation. When an individual agrees to serve a lwa, it is deemed a lifelong commitment. Vodou has a strong oral culture, and its teachings are primarily disseminated through oral transmission, although many practitioners began to use texts after they appeared in the mid-20th century. The terminology used in Vodou ritual is called langaj. Unlike in Santería and Candomblé, which employ Yoruba as a liturgical language not understood by most practitioners, in Vodou the liturgies are predominantly in Haitian Creole, the everyday language of most Vodouists.

=== Oungan and Manbo ===
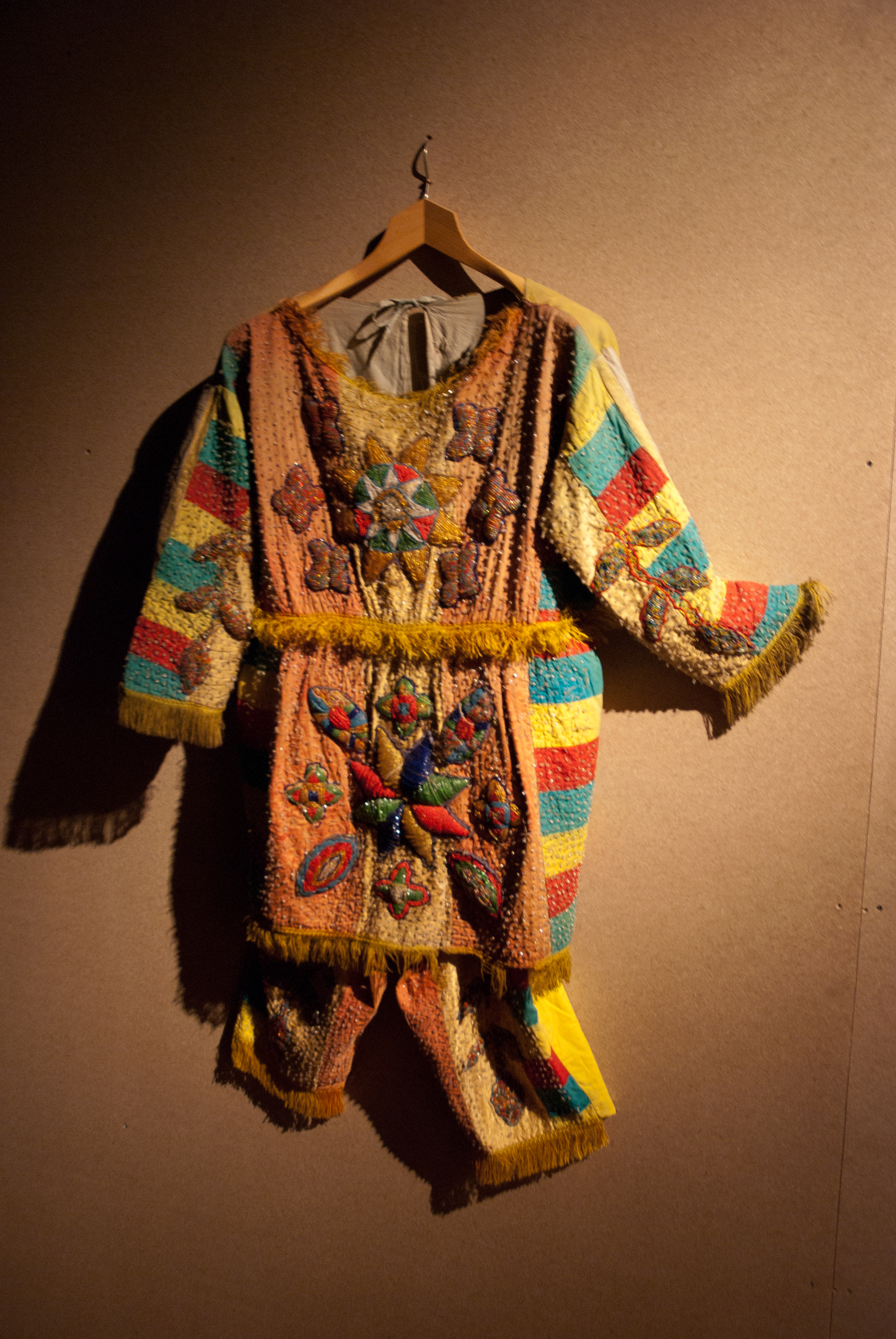
Ceremonial suit worn in Haitian Vodou rites, on display in the Ethnological Museum of Berlin, Germany

Male priests are referred to as an oungan, alternatively spelled houngan or hungan, or a prèt Vodou ("Vodou priest"). Priestesses are termed manbo, alternatively spelled mambo. Oungan numerically dominate in rural Haiti, while there is a more equitable balance of priests and priestesses in urban areas. The oungan and manbo are tasked with organising liturgies, preparing initiations, offering consultations with clients using divination, and preparing remedies for the sick. There is no priestly hierarchy, with oungan and manbo being largely self-sufficient. In many cases, the role is hereditary. Historical evidence suggests that the role of the oungan and manbo intensified over the course of the 20th century, making "temple Vodou" more common than previously.

Vodou teaches that the lwa call an individual to become an oungan or manbo, and if the latter refuses then misfortune may befall them. A prospective oungan or manbo must normally rise through the other roles in a Vodou congregation before undergoing an apprenticeship with a pre-existing oungan or manbo lasting several months or years. After this apprenticeship, they undergo an initiation ceremony, the details of which are kept secret from non-initiates. Certain oungan and manbo do not undergo any apprenticeship, but claim to gain their training directly from the lwa. Their authenticity is often challenged, and they are referred to as hungan-macoutte, a term bearing some disparaging connotations. Becoming an oungan or manbo is expensive, often requiring the purchase of ritual paraphernalia and land on which to build a temple. To finance this, many save up for a long time.

Vodouists believe that the oungan's role is modelled on the lwa Loco; in Vodou mythology, he was the first oungan and his consort Ayizan the first manbo. The oungan and manbo are expected to display the power of second sight, something regarded as a gift from Bondye that can be revealed to the individual through visions or dreams. Many priests and priestesses are often attributed fantastical powers in stories told about them, and may bolster their status with claims to have received revelations from the lwa, sometimes via visits to the lwa's own abode.

There is often strong competition between different oungan and manbo. Their main income derives from healing the sick, supplemented with payments received for overseeing initiations and selling talismans and amulets. Being an oungan or manbo provides social status and material profit, with many oungan and manbo becoming wealthier than their clients. Although their fame and reputation vary, oungan and manbo are generally powerful and well-respected members of Haitian society. Respected Vodou priests and priestesses are often literate in a society where semi-literacy and illiteracy are common. They can recite from printed texts and write letters for illiterate members of their community. Owing to their prominence in a community, the oungan and manbo can effectively become political leaders, or otherwise influence local politics.

=== The ounfò ===
A Vodou temple is called an ounfò, varyingly spelled hounfò, hounfort, or humfo. An alternative term is gangan, although the connotations of this term vary regionally in Haiti. Most communal Vodou activities centre around this ounfò, forming what is called "temple Vodou". The size and shape of ounfòs vary, from basic shacks to more lavish structures, the latter being more common in Port-au-Prince. Their designs are dependent on the resources and tastes of the oungan or manbo running them. Each ounfò is autonomous, and often has its own unique customs.

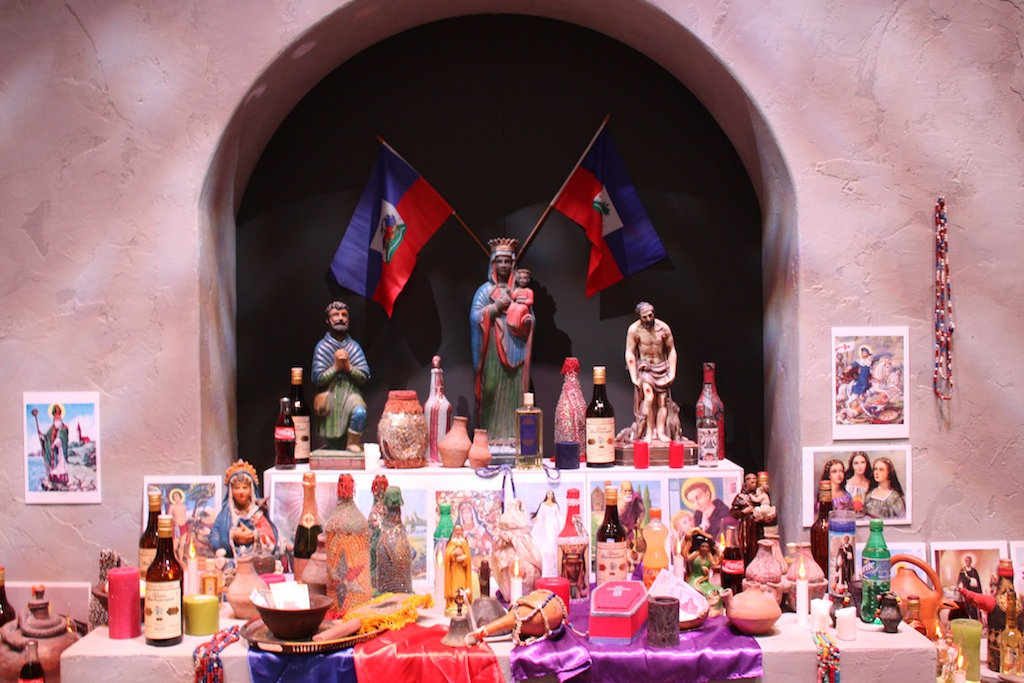
A replica Vodou altar on display at the Tropenmuseum in Amsterdam, Netherlands

The main ceremonial room in the ounfò is the peristil, understood as a microcosmic representation of the cosmos. In the peristil, brightly painted posts hold up the roof; the central post is the poto mitan, which is used as a pivot during ritual dances and the pillar through which the lwa enter the room during ceremonies. It is around this central post that offerings, including both vèvè patterns and animal sacrifices, are made. However, in the Haitian diaspora many Vodouists perform their rites in basements, where no poto mitan are available. The peristil typically has an earthen floor, allowing libations to the lwa to drain directly into the soil; where this is not possible, libations are poured into an enamel basin. Some peristil include seating around the walls.

Adjacent rooms in the ounfò include the caye-mystéres, also known as the bagi, badji, or sobadji. This is where stonework altars, known as pè, stand against the wall or are arranged in tiers. Also present may be a sink dedicated to the lwa Danbala-Wedo. The caye-mystéres is also used to store clothing that will be worn by those possessed by the lwa during rituals. If space is available, the ounfò may also have a room set aside for the patron lwa of that temple. Many ounfòs have a room known as the djévo in which the initiate is confined during their initiatory ceremony. Every ounfò usually has a room or corner of a room devoted to Erzuli Freda. Some ounfò will also have additional rooms in which the oungan or manbo lives.

The area around the ounfò often contains objects dedicated to particular lwa, such as a pool of water for Danbala, a black cross for Baron Samedi, and a pince (iron bar) embedded in a brazier for Criminel. Sacred trees, known as arbres-reposoirs, sometimes mark the ounfò's external boundary. Hanging from these trees can be found macounte straw sacks, strips of material, and animal skulls. Various animals, particularly birds but also some mammal species such as goats, are sometimes kept within the perimeter of the ounfò for use as sacrifices.

==== The congregation ====
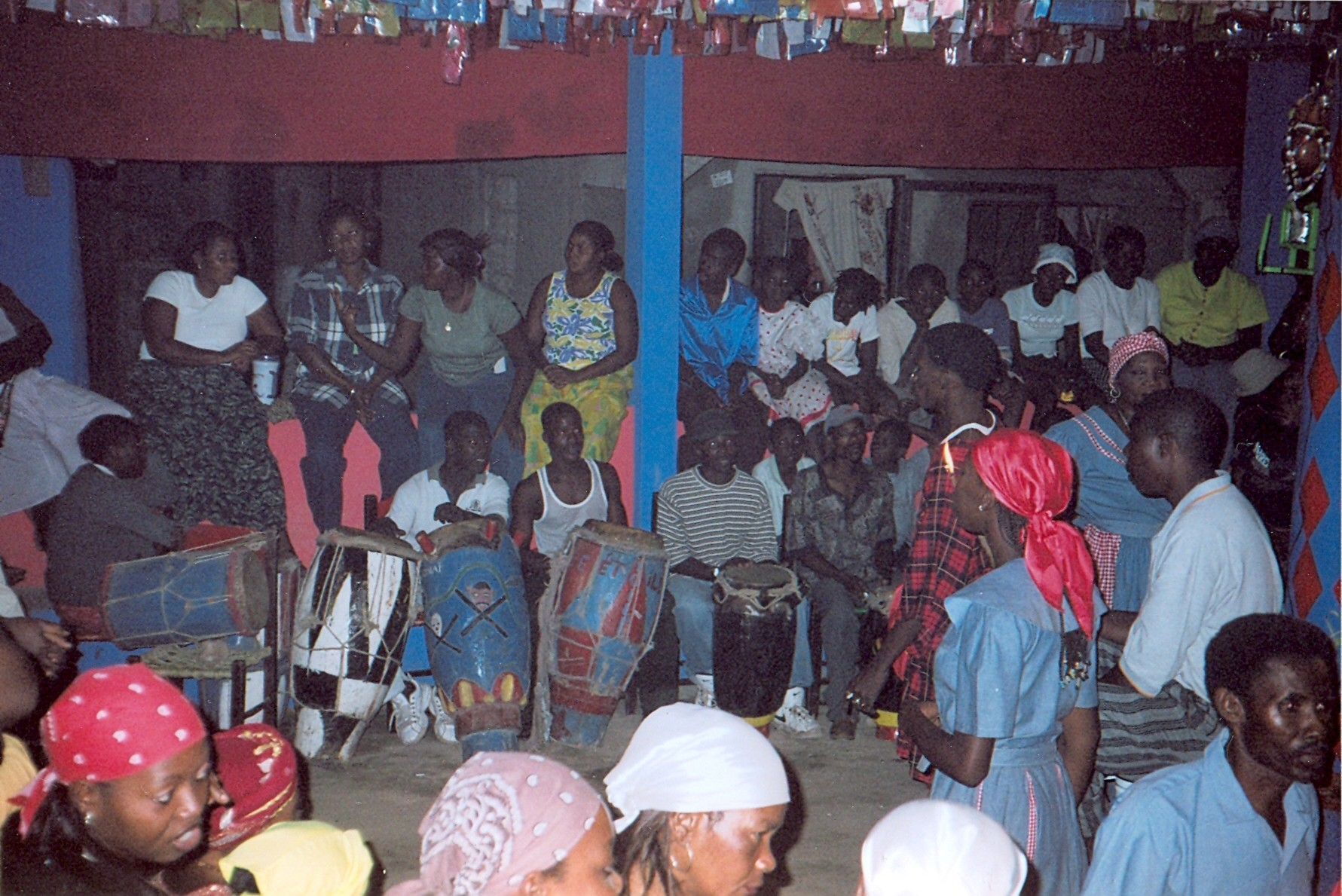
A Vodou ceremony taking place in an ounfò in Jacmel, Haiti

Forming a spiritual community of practitioners, the ounfò's congregation are known as the pititt-caye (children of the house). They worship under the authority of an oungan or manbo, below whom is ranked the ounsi, individuals who make a lifetime commitment to serving the lwa. Members of either sex can join the ounsi, although most are female. The ounsi's duties include cleaning the peristil, sacrificing animals, and taking part in the dances at which they must be prepared to be possessed by a lwa. The oungan and manbo conduct initiatory ceremonies whereby people become ounsi, oversee their training, and act as their counsellor, healer, and protector. In turn, the ounsi are expected to be obedient to their oungan or manbo.

One of the ounsi becomes the hungenikon or reine-chanterelle, the mistress of the choir. They are responsible for overseeing the liturgical singing and shaking the chacha rattle which dictates the rhythm during ceremonies. They are aided by the hungenikon-la-place, commandant general de la place, or quartermaster, who is charged with overseeing offerings and keeping order during the rites. Another figure is le confiance (the confidant), the ounsi who oversees the ounfò's administrative functions. Congregants often form a sosyete soutyen (société soutien, support society), through which subscriptions are paid to help maintain the ounfò and organize the major religious feasts. Another ritual figure sometimes present is the prèt savann ("bush priest"), a man with a knowledge of Latin who is capable of administering Catholic baptisms, weddings, and the last rites, and who is willing to perform these at Vodou ceremonies.

In rural areas especially, a congregation may consist of an extended family, one whose patriarch serves as priest. Families, particularly in rural areas, often believe that their zansèt (ancestors) tie them to an premye mèt bitasyon (original founder) from whom they have inherited both their land and their familial spirits. Elsewhere, particularly in urban areas, an ounfò can act as an initiatory family. A priest becomes the papa ("father") while the priestess becomes the manman ("mother") to the initiate; the initiate becomes their initiator's pitit (spiritual child). Those sharing an initiator call themselves "brother" and "sister". Individuals may select a particular ounfò because it exists in their locality, because their family are already members, because they are impressed by the oungan or manbo who runs it, or because it focuses on their favored lwa.

=== Initiation ===
A vèvè pattern designed to invoke Gran Brigit, one of the lwa spirits worshipped in Haitian Vodou

Vodou is hierarchical and includes a series of initiations. There are typically four levels of initiation, the fourth of which makes someone an oungan or manbo. There is much variation in what these initiation ceremonies entail, and the details are kept secret. Each initiatory stage is associated with a state of mind called a konesan (conaissance or knowledge). Successive initiations are required to move through the various konesans, and it is in these konesans that priestly power is believed to reside.

The first initiation rite is the kanzo; this term also describes the initiate themselves. Initiation is generally expensive, complex, and requires significant preparation. Prospective initiates are for instance required to memorise many songs and learn the characteristics of various lwa. Vodouists believe the lwa may encourage an individual towards initiation, bringing misfortune upon them if they refuse.

Initiation will often be preceded by bathing in special preparations. The first part of the initiation rite is known as the kouche or huño, and is marked by salutations and offerings to the lwa. It begins with the chire ayizan, a ceremony in which palm leaves are frayed and then worn by the initiate. Sometimes the bat ge or batter guerre ("beating war") is performed instead, designed to beat away the old. During the rite, the initiate comes to be regarded as the child of a particular lwa, their mèt tèt.

This is followed by a period of seclusion within the djèvo known as the kouche. A deliberately uncomfortable experience, it involves the initiate sleeping on a mat on the floor, often with a stone for a pillow. They wear a white tunic, and a specific salt-free diet is followed. It includes a lav tèt ("head washing") to prepare the initiate for having the lwa enter and reside in their head. Voudoists believe that one of the two parts of the human soul, the gwo bonnanj, is removed from the initiate's head, thus making space for the lwa to enter and reside there.

The initiation ceremony requires the preparation of pot tèts (head pots), usually white porcelain cups with a lid in which a range of items are placed, including hair, food, herbs, and oils. These are regarded as a home for the spirits. After the period of seclusion in the djèvo, the new initiate is brought out and presented to the congregation; they are now referred to as ounsi lave tèt. When the new initiate is presented to the rest of the community, they carry their pot tèt on their head, before placing it on the altar. The final stage of the process involves the initiate being given an ason rattle. The initiation process is seen to have ended when the new initiate is first possessed by a lwa. Initiation is seen as creating a bond between a devotee and their tutelary lwa, and the former will often take on a new name that alludes to the name of this lwa. Finally, after the kouche, the new initiate may be expected to visit a Catholic church.

=== Shrines and altars ===
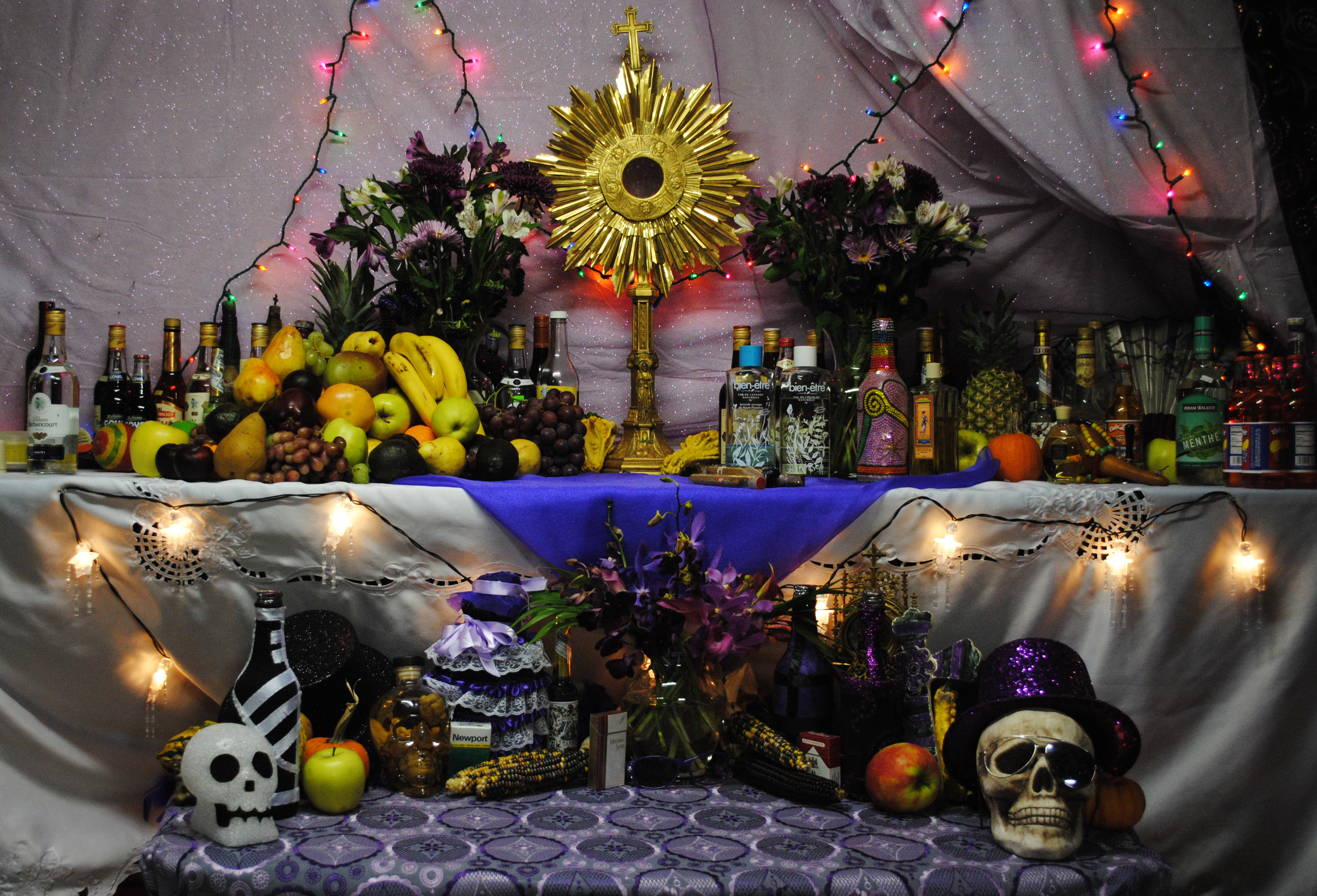
An altar in Boston, Massachusetts, established during the November festival of the Gede

The creation of sacred works is important in Vodou. Votive objects are typically made from industrial materials, including iron, plastic, sequins, china, tinsel, and plaster.

An altar, or pè, will often contain images of Roman Catholic saints, typically lithographs. Since the mid-19th century, chromolithography has impacted Vodou imagery, facilitating the widespread availability of images of the Roman Catholic saints who are equated with the lwa. Various Vodouists have made use of varied available materials in constructing their shrines. Cosentino encountered a shrine in Port-au-Prince where Baron Samedi was represented by a plastic statue of Santa Claus wearing a black sombrero, and in another by a figurine of Star Wars-character Darth Vader. In Port-au-Prince, it is common for Vodouists to include human skulls on their altar for the Gede. In ounfòs where both Rada and Petwo deities are worshipped, their altars are kept separate.

Spaces other than the temple are used for ritual. As spaces where the spirits of the dead reside, cemeteries are suitable for certain rituals. In rural Haiti, family-owned cemeteries often play a key role in familial rituals. Crossroads are also ritual locations, selected as points of access to the spirit world. Certain trees are deemed to possess resident spirits and are used as natural altars. Different tree species are associated with different lwa; Oyu, for example, is linked with mango trees, and Danbala with bougainvillea. Certain trees have had metal affixed to them to form shrines to Ogou, who is associated with both iron and the roads. Other spaces used for ritual include Christian churches, rivers, the sea, fields, and markets. Many Vodouists have ritual spaces in their home, especially a home altar called a wogatwa, which may vary in complexity. Many practitioners also have a home altar to their ancestors.

=== Vèvè and ritual paraphernalia ===
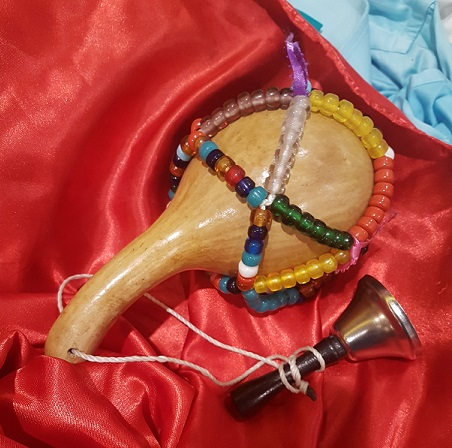
An ason, the ritual rattle emblematic of the Vodou priesthood

Central to Vodou ritual are drawings known as vèvè, the purpose of which is to summon lwa. These are sketched on the peristil floor using cornmeal, ash, coffee grounds, or powdered eggshells. Usually arranged symmetrically around the poto-mitan, these designs sometimes incorporate letters.

Inside the peristil, practitioners also unfurl ceremonial flags known as drapo (flags) at the start of a ceremony. These are deemed points of entry through which the lwa can enter the peristil. Often made of silk or velvet and decorated with shiny objects such as sequins, each drapo is commonly devoted to a specific lwa and portrays their vèvè or corresponding Roman Catholic saint.

A batèms (baptism) is a ritual used to make an object a vessel for the lwa. Objects consecrated for ritual use are believed to contain a spiritual essence or power called nanm. The ason is a sacred rattle used in summoning the lwa, especially for Rada rites. It consists of an empty, dried gourd covered in beads and snake vertebra. Prior to being used in ritual it requires consecration. It is a symbol of the priesthood; assuming the duties of a manbo or oungan is referred to as "taking the ason". For Petwo rites a different rattle, the tcha-tcha, is favored. Another type of sacred object are the "thunder stones", often prehistoric axe-heads, which are associated with specific lwa and kept in oil to preserve their power.

=== Offerings and animal sacrifice ===
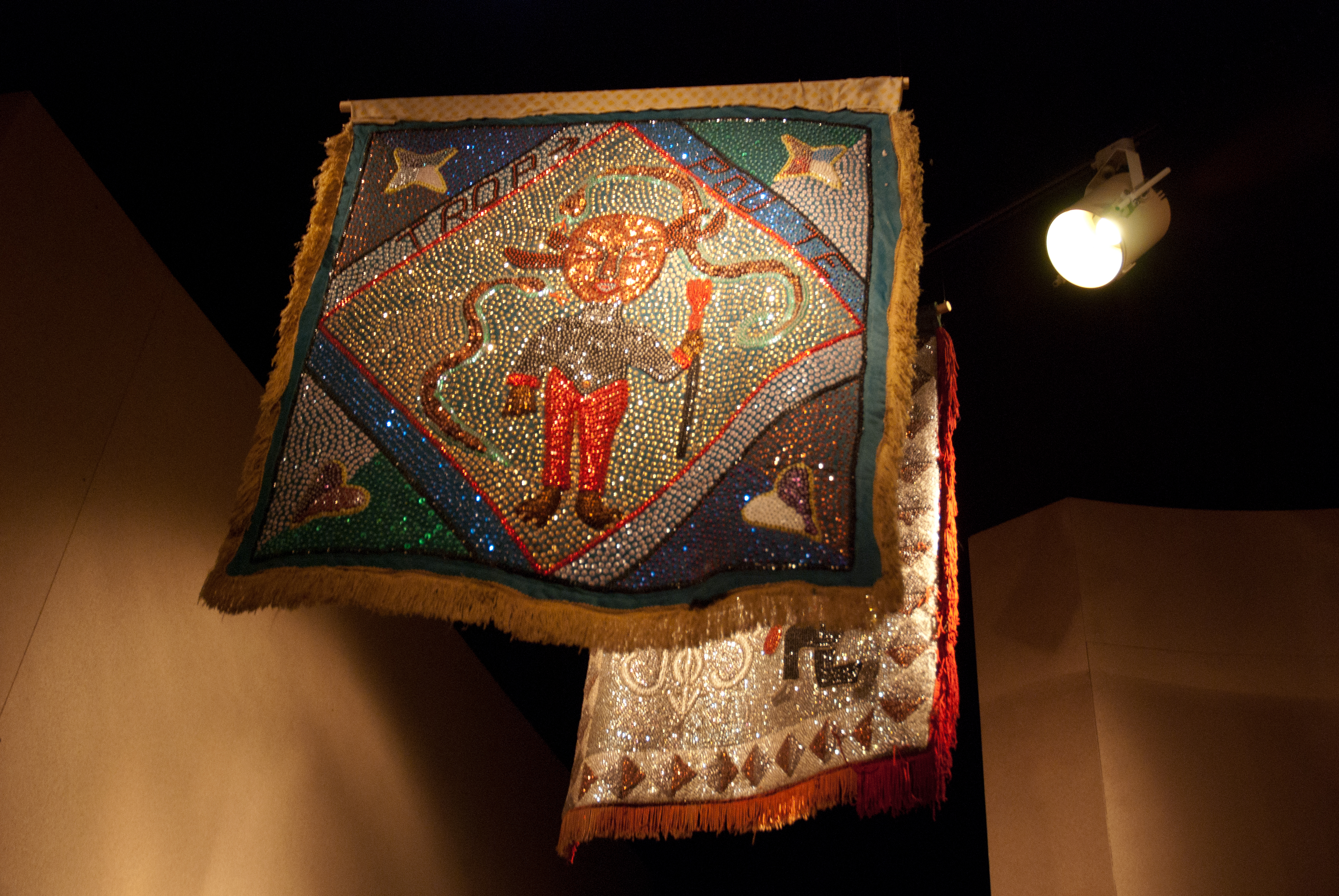
A drapo flag, which are used to invoke the lwa at Vodou ceremonies

Feeding the lwa is of great importance, with offering rites often termed manje lwa ("feeding the lwa"). Offering food and drink to the lwa is Vodou's most common ritual, conducted both communally and in the home. The choice of food and drink offered varies depending on the lwa in question, with different lwa believed to favor certain foodstuffs and beverages. Danbala for instance requires white foods, especially eggs, while Legba's offerings, whether meat, tubers, or vegetables, need to be grilled on a fire. The lwa of the Ogu and Nago nations prefer raw rum or clairin, while the lwa Ayizan avoids alcohol. Certain foods are also offered in the belief that they are intrinsically virtuous, such as grilled maize, peanuts, and cassava.

A manje sèk (dry meal) is an offering of grains, fruit, and vegetables that often precedes a simple ceremony; its name derives from the absence of blood. Animal sacrifices are often favored at annual feasts that an oungan or manbo organizes for their congregation. Species used for sacrifice include chickens, goats, and bulls, with pigs often favored for Petwo lwa. The animal may be washed, dressed in the color of the specific lwa, and marked with food or water. Often, the animal's throat will be cut and the blood collected in a calabash. Chickens are often killed by the pulling off their heads; their limbs may be broken beforehand. In the case of Agwé, a lwa of the sea, white sheep are sailed out to Trois Ilets and thrown overboard as a sacrifice.

Once killed, the animal may be butchered and its organs removed, sometimes cooked, and placed on the altar or vèvè. It sometimes sits within a kwi, or calabash shell bowl. Vodouists believe that the lwa consume the essence of the food. Food is typically offered when it is cool, and is left for a while before humans may eat it. Offerings not consumed by the celebrants are often buried or left at a crossroads. Libations might be poured into the ground.

=== The Dans ===
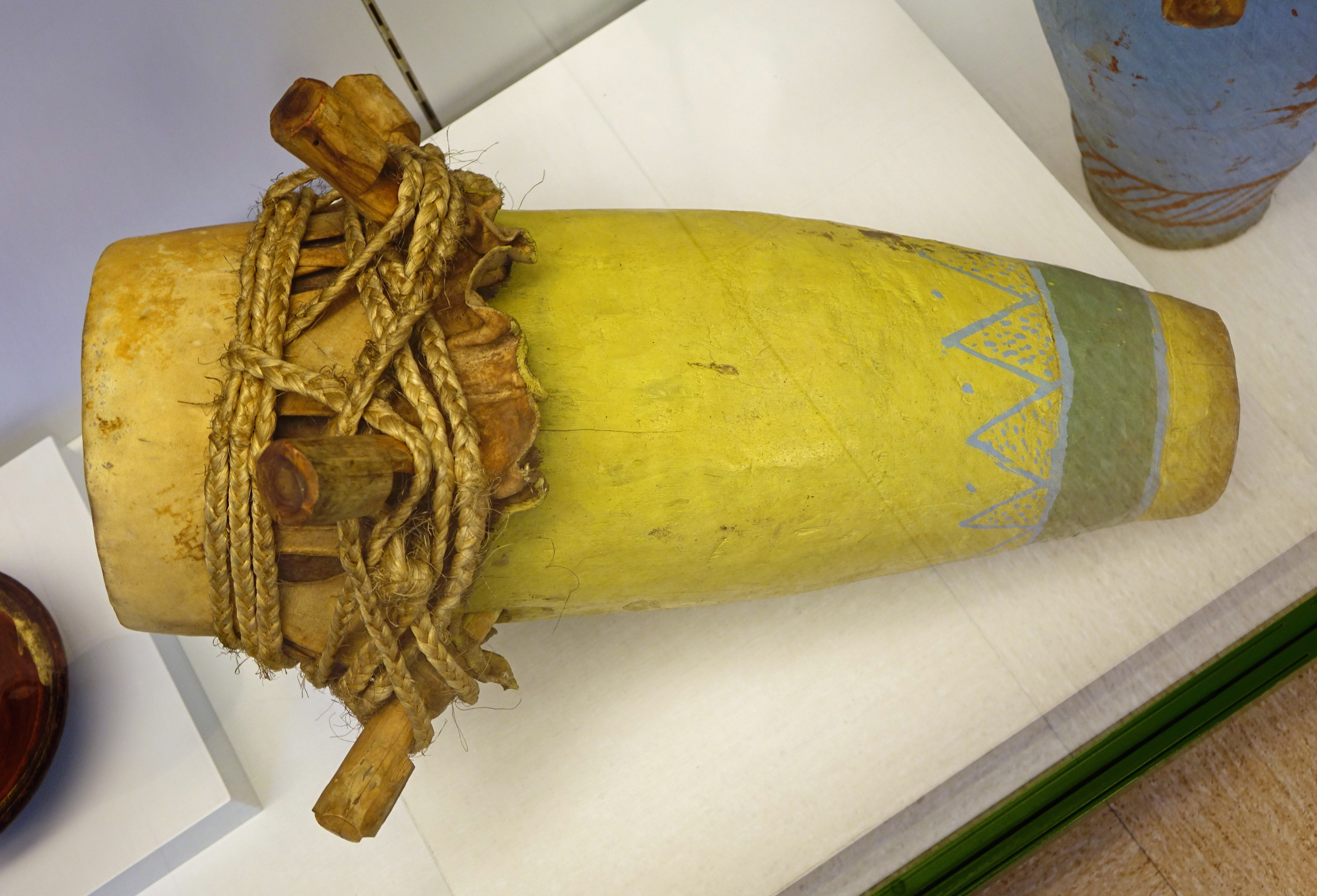
Multiple styles of drum are employed in Vodou ritual; this example is used in rites invoking Rada lwa.

Vodou's nocturnal gatherings are often referred to as the dans ("dance"), reflecting the prominent role that dancing has in such ceremonies. Their purpose is to invite a lwa to enter the ritual space and possess one of the worshippers, through whom they can communicate with the congregation. The success of this procedure is predicated on mastering the different ritual actions and on getting the aesthetic right to please the lwa. The proceedings can last for the entirety of the night.

On arriving, the congregation typically disperse along the perimeter of the peristil. The ritual often begins with Roman Catholic prayers and hymns; these may be led by the prèt savann, although not all ounfò have anyone in this role. This is followed by the shaking of the ason rattle to summon the lwa. Two Haitian Creole songs, the Priyè Deyò ("Outside Prayers"), may then be sung, lasting from 45 minutes to an hour. The main lwa are then saluted, individually, in a specific order. Legba always comes first, as he is believed to open the way for the others. Each lwa may be offered either three or seven songs, which are specific to them.

The rites employed to call down the lwa vary depending on the nanchon in question. During large-scale ceremonies, the lwa are invited to appear through the drawing of vèvè on the ground using cornmeal. Also used to call down the spirits is a process of drumming, singing, prayers, and dances. Libations and offerings of food are made to the lwa, which includes animal sacrifices. The order and protocol for welcoming the lwa is referred to as regleman.

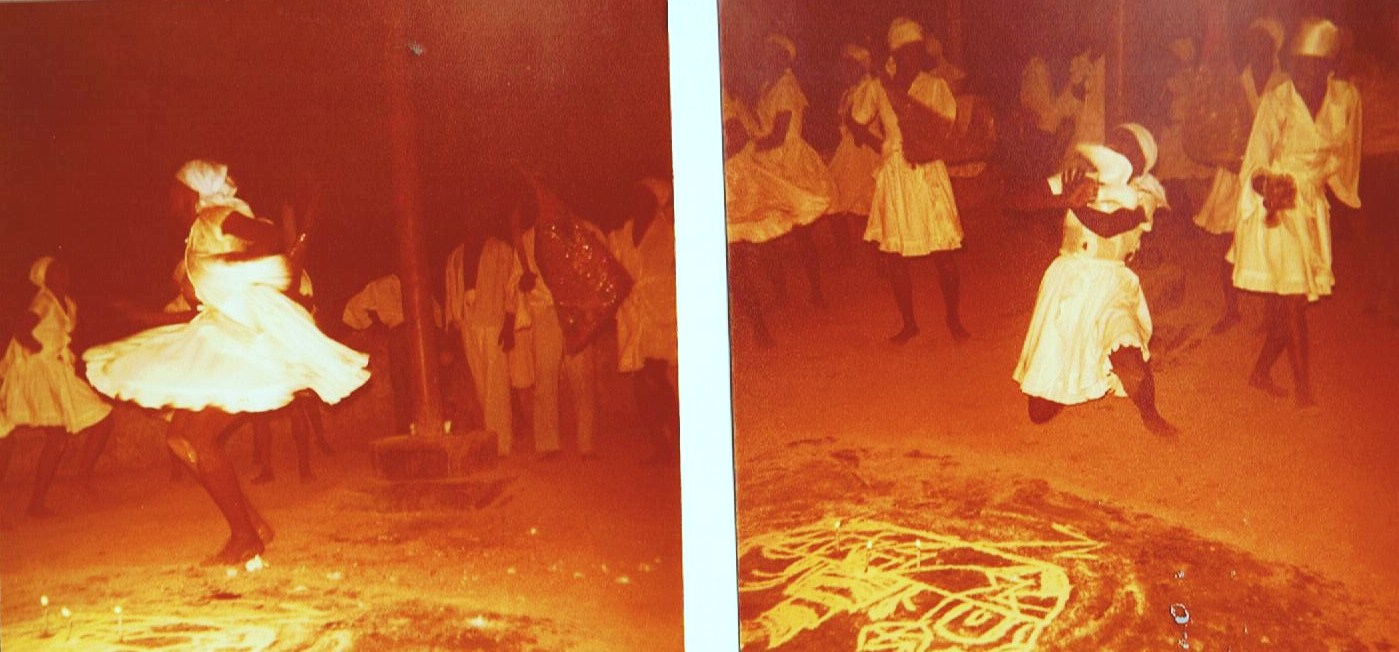
Dancing at Vodou ceremony in Port-au-Prince in 1976

A symbol of the religion, the drum is perhaps the most sacred item in Vodou. Vodouists believe that ritual drums contain an etheric force, the nanm, and a spirit called ountò. Specific ceremonies accompany the construction of a drum so that it is considered suitable for ritual use. In the bay manje tanbou ("feeding of the drum") ritual, offerings are given to the drum itself. Reflecting its status, when Vodouists enter the peristil they customarily bow before the drums. Different types of drum are used, sometimes reserved for rituals devoted to specific lwa; Petwo rites for instance involve two types of drum, whereas Rada rituals require three. Ritual drummers are called tanbouryes, and becoming one requires a lengthy apprenticeship. The drumming style, choice of rhythm, and composition of the orchestra differs depending on which nation of lwa are being invoked. The drum rhythms typically generate a kase ("break"), which the master drummer will initiate to oppose the main rhythm being played by the rest of the drummers. This is seen as having a destabilizing effect on the dancers and helping to facilitate their possession.

Drumming is typically accompanied by singing, usually in Haitian Creole, although sometimes in Fon or Yoruba. These songs are often structured around a call and response, with a soloist singing a line and the chorus responding with either the same line or an abbreviated version. The soloist is the oundjenikon, who maintains the rhythm with a rattle. Lyrically simple and repetitive, these songs are invocations to summon a lwa. Dancing also plays a major role in ritual, utilising the rhythm of the drummers. The dances are simple, lacking complex choreography, and usually involve the dancers moving counterclockwise around the poto mitan. Specific dance movements can indicate the lwa or their nanchon being summoned; dances for Agwe for instance imitate swimming motions. Vodouists believe that the lwa renew themselves through the vitality of the dancers.

==== Spirit possession ====
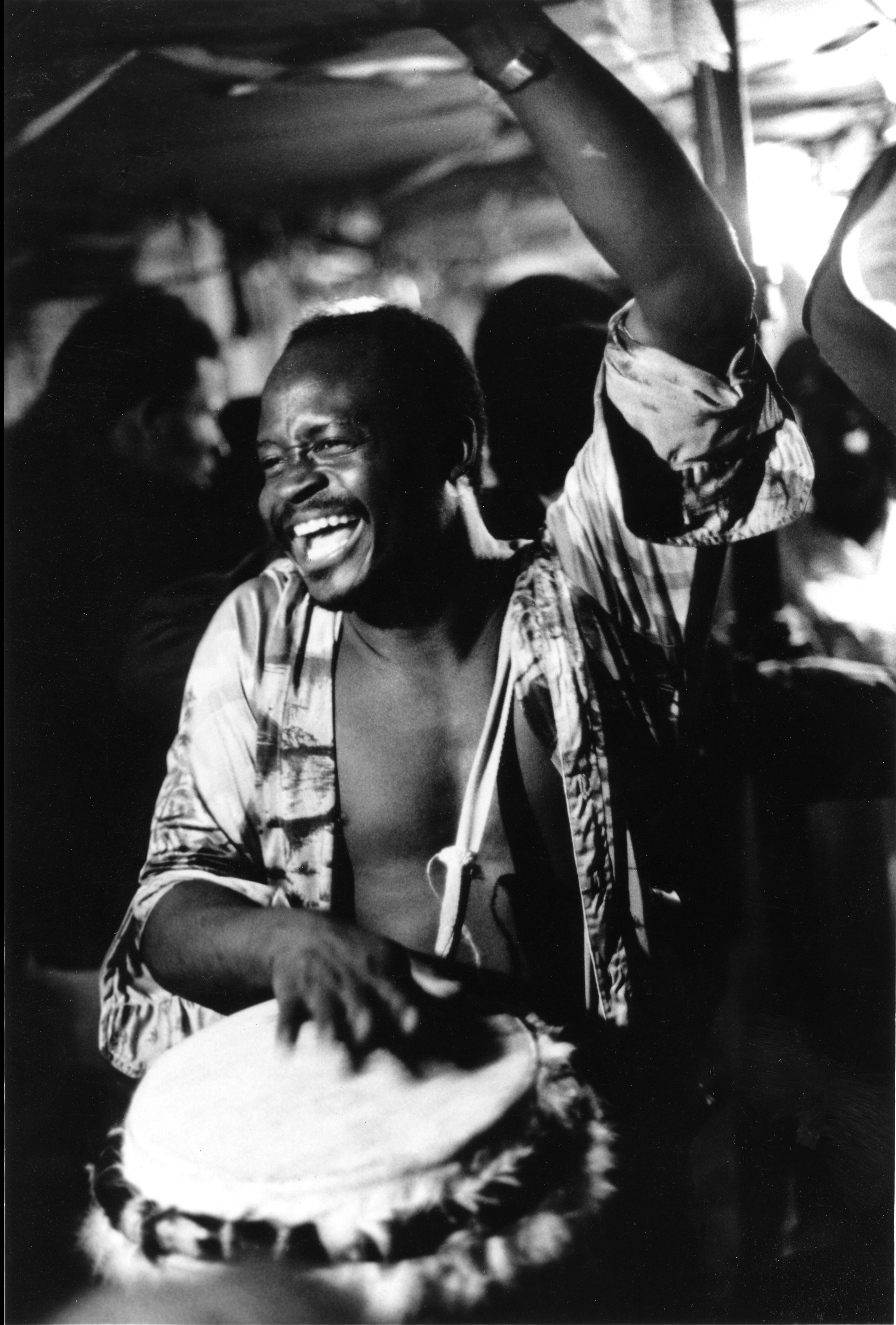
Drummer Frisner Augustin in a Vodou ceremony in Brooklyn, New York City, during the early 1980s

Spirit possession is important, being central to many Vodou rituals. The person being possessed is called the chwal (horse); the act of possession is termed "mounting a horse". Vodou teaches that both male and female lwa can possess either men or women. Although children are often present at these ceremonies, they are rarely possessed as it is considered too dangerous. Some individuals attending the dance will put a certain item, often wax, in their hair or headgear to prevent possession. While the specific drums and songs used are designed to encourage a specific lwa to possess someone, sometimes an unexpected lwa appears and takes possession instead.

The possession trance is termed the kriz lwa. Vodouists believe that the lwa enters the head of the chwal and displaces their gwo bon anj, making the chwal tremble and convulse. As their consciousness has been removed from their head during the possession, Vodouists believe that the chwal will have no memory of the incident. The length of the possession varies, often lasting a few hours but sometimes several days. Sometimes a succession of lwa possess the same individual, one after the other. Possession may end with the chwal collapsing in a semi-conscious state, being left physically exhausted.

Once the lwa possesses an individual, the congregation greet it with a burst of song and dance. The chwal will typically bow before the officiating priest or priestess and prostrate before the poto mitan. The chwal is often escorted into an adjacent room where they are dressed in clothing associated with the possessing lwa. Alternatively, the clothes are brought out and they are dressed in the peristil itself. These costumes and props help the chwal take on the appearance of the lwa; many ounfò have a large wooden phallus used by those possessed by Gede lwa, for instance. Once the chwal has been dressed, congregants kiss the floor before them.

The chwal adopts the behavior of the possessing lwa; their performance can be very theatrical. Those believing themselves possessed by the serpent Danbala, for instance, often slither on the floor, dart out their tongue, and climb the posts of the peristil. Those possessed by Zaka, lwa of agriculture, will dress as a peasant in a straw hat with a clay pipe and will often speak in a rustic accent. The chwal will often join in with the dances, eat or drink. Sometimes the lwa, through the chwal, will engage in financial transactions with members of the congregation, for instance by selling them food that has been given as an offering or lending them money.

Possession facilitates direct communication between Vodouists and the lwa; through the chwal, the lwa communicates with their devotees, offering counsel, chastisement, blessings, warnings about the future, and healing. Lwa possession has a healing function, with the possessed individual expected to reveal possible cures to the ailments of those assembled. Clothing that the chwal touches is regarded as bringing luck. The lwa may also offer advice to the individual they are possessing; because the latter is not believed to retain any memory of the events, it is expected that other members of the congregation will pass along the lwa's message. In some instances, practitioners have reported being possessed at other times of ordinary life, such as when someone is in the middle of the market, or when they are asleep.

=== Divination and healing ===
A common form of divination employed by oungan and manbo is to invoke a lwa into a pitcher, where it will then be asked questions. Other forms of divination used by Vodouists include the casting of shells, cartomancy, studying leaves, coffee grounds or cinders in a glass, or looking into a candle flame. A form of divination associated especially with Petwo lwa is the use of a gembo shell, sometimes with a mirror attached to one side and affixed at both ends to string. The string is twirled and the directions of the shell used to interpret the responses of the lwa.

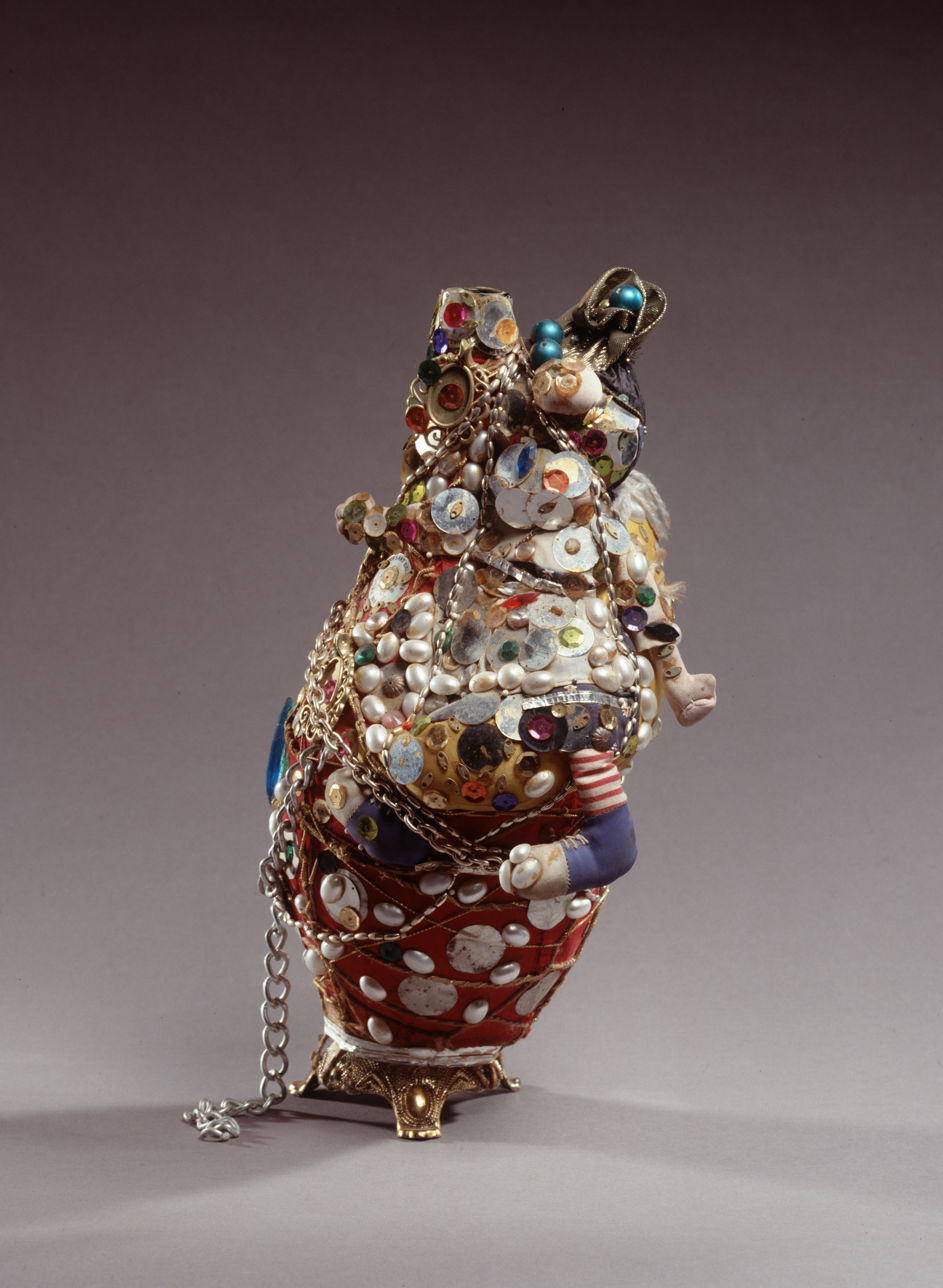
A pakèt kongo on display in the Nationaal Museum van Wereldculturen in the Netherlands

Healing plays an important role in Vodou. A client will approach a manbo or oungan complaining of illness or misfortune and the latter will use divination to determine the cause and select a remedy. Manbo and oungan typically have a wide knowledge of plants and their medicinal uses. When collecting plants they are expected to show them respect, for instance by leaving coins in payment for removing leaves.

To heal, Vodou specialists often prescribe baths, consisting of water infused with various ingredients, or produce powders for a specific purpose, such as to attract good luck or aid seduction. Alternatively, they may create a material object infused with spirits or medicines, a wanga, although these can also be devoted to harmful purposes. Manbo and oungan often provide talismans, called a pwen (point), travay maji (magic work), pakèt or pakèt kongo. The latter term highlights the potential influence of the Bakongo minkisi on these Haitian ritual creations.

In Haiti, oungan or manbo may advise their clients to seek assistance from medical professionals, while the latter may also send their patients to see an oungan or manbo. Although in the late 20th century there were concerns that the Haitian reliance on oungan and manbo was contributing to the spread of HIV/AIDS, by the early 21st century, various NGOs and other groups were working on bringing Vodou officiants into the broader campaign against the virus. In Haiti, there are also doktè fèy ("herb doctors"; "leaf doctors") who offer herbal remedies for ailments but deal in fewer problems than oungan and manbo.

=== Harming practices ===
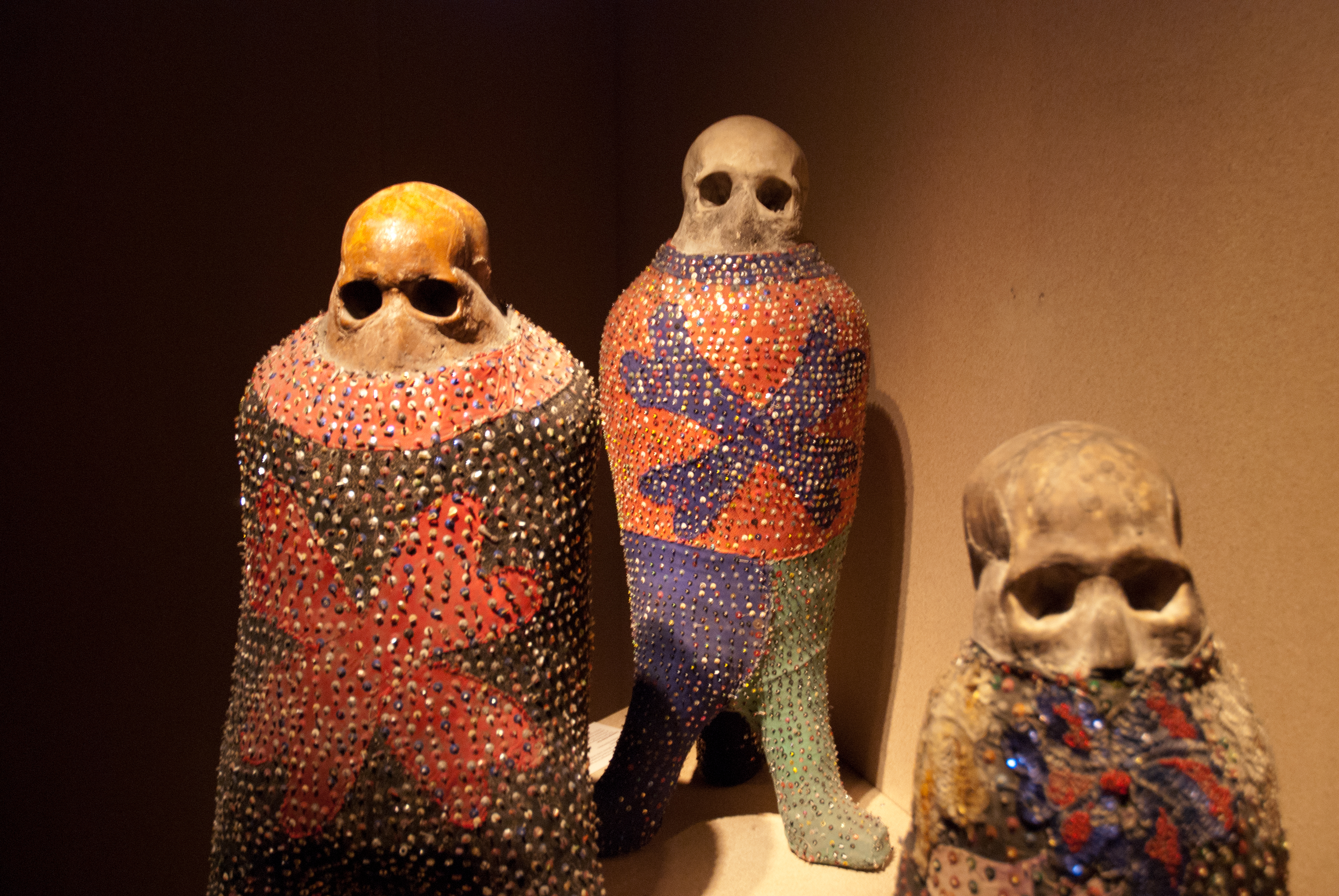
Haitian skulls at the Ethnographic Museum in Berlin. In Vodou, human skulls may be used either for sorcery or for healing.

Vodou teaches that supernatural factors cause or exacerbate many problems. It holds that humans can cause supernatural harm to others, either unintentionally or deliberately, in the latter case exerting power over a person through possession of hair or nail clippings belonging to them. Vodouists also often believe that supernatural harm can be caused by other entities. The lougawou is a human, usually female, who transforms into an animal and drains blood from sleeping victims, while members of the Bizango secret society are feared for their reputed ability to transform into dogs, in which form they walk the streets at night.

An individual who turns to the lwa to harm others is a choché, or a bòkò, although this latter term can also refer to an oungan generally. They are described as someone who sert des deux mains ("serves with both hands"), or is travaillant des deux mains ("working with both hands"). As the good lwa have rejected them as unworthy, bòko are believed to work with lwa achte ("bought lwa"), spirits that will work for anyone who pays them, and often members of the Petwo nanchon. According to Haitian popular belief, bòkò engage in anvwamò ("expeditions"), setting the dead against an individual to cause the latter's sudden illness and death, and utilise baka, malevolent spirits sometimes in animal form. In Haiti, there is much suspicion and censure toward those suspected of being bòkò. The curses of the bòkò are believed to be countered by the oungan and manbo, who can revert the curse through an exorcism that incorporates invocations of protective lwa, massages, and baths. In Haiti, some oungan and manbo have been accused of working with a bòkò, arranging for the latter to curse individuals so that they can financially profit from removing these curses.

=== Funerals, the dead, and zonbis ===
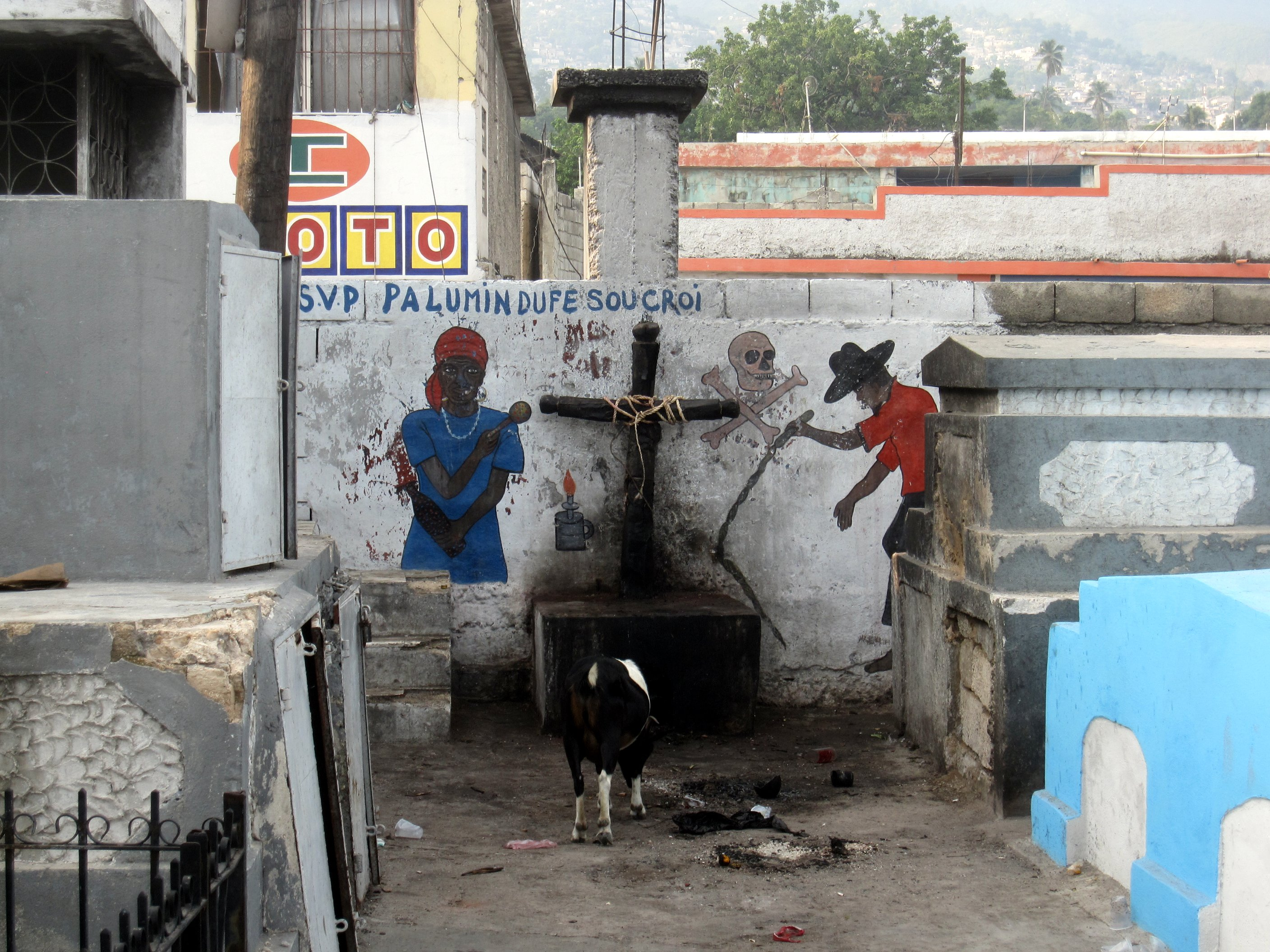
A cross in a Haitian cemetery, photographed in 2012. The crucifix is central to the iconography of the Gede; the Baron La Croix is a public crucifix associated with Baron Samedi, chief of the Gede.

Vodou features complex funerary customs. Following an individual's death, the desounen ritual frees the gwo bonnanj from their body and disconnects them from their tutelary lwa. The corpse is then bathed in a herbal infusion by an individual termed the benyè, who gives the dead person messages to take with them. A wake, the veye, follows. The body is then buried in the cemetery, often according to Roman Catholic custom.

In northern Haiti, an additional rite takes place at the ounfò on the day of the funeral, the kase kanari (breaking of the clay pot). In this, a jar is washed in substances including kleren, placed within a trench dug into the peristil floor, and smashed. The trench is then refilled. The night after the funeral, the novena takes place at the home of the deceased, involving Roman Catholic prayers; a mass for them is held a year after death, sometimes performed by a prèt savann. Vodouists fear the dead's ability to harm the living; it is believed that the deceased may for instance punish their living relatives if the latter fail to appropriately mourn them.

Many Vodouists believe that a practitioner's spirit dwells in the land of Ginen, located at the bottom of a lake or river, for a year and a day. A year and a day after death, the wete mò nan dlo ("extracting the dead from the waters of the abyss") ritual may take place, in which the deceased's gwo bonnanj is reclaimed from the realm of the dead and placed into a clay jar or bottle called the govi. Now ensconced in the world of the living, the gwo bonnanj of this ancestor is deemed capable of assisting its descendants and guiding them with its wisdom. Practitioners sometimes believe that failing to conduct this ritual can result in misfortune, illness, and death for the family of the deceased. Offerings then given to this spirit of the dead are termed manje mò. The notion of a spirit being encased in a vessel and then used for workings likely derives from Bakongo influences, and has similarities with the Bakongo-derived Palo religion from Cuba.

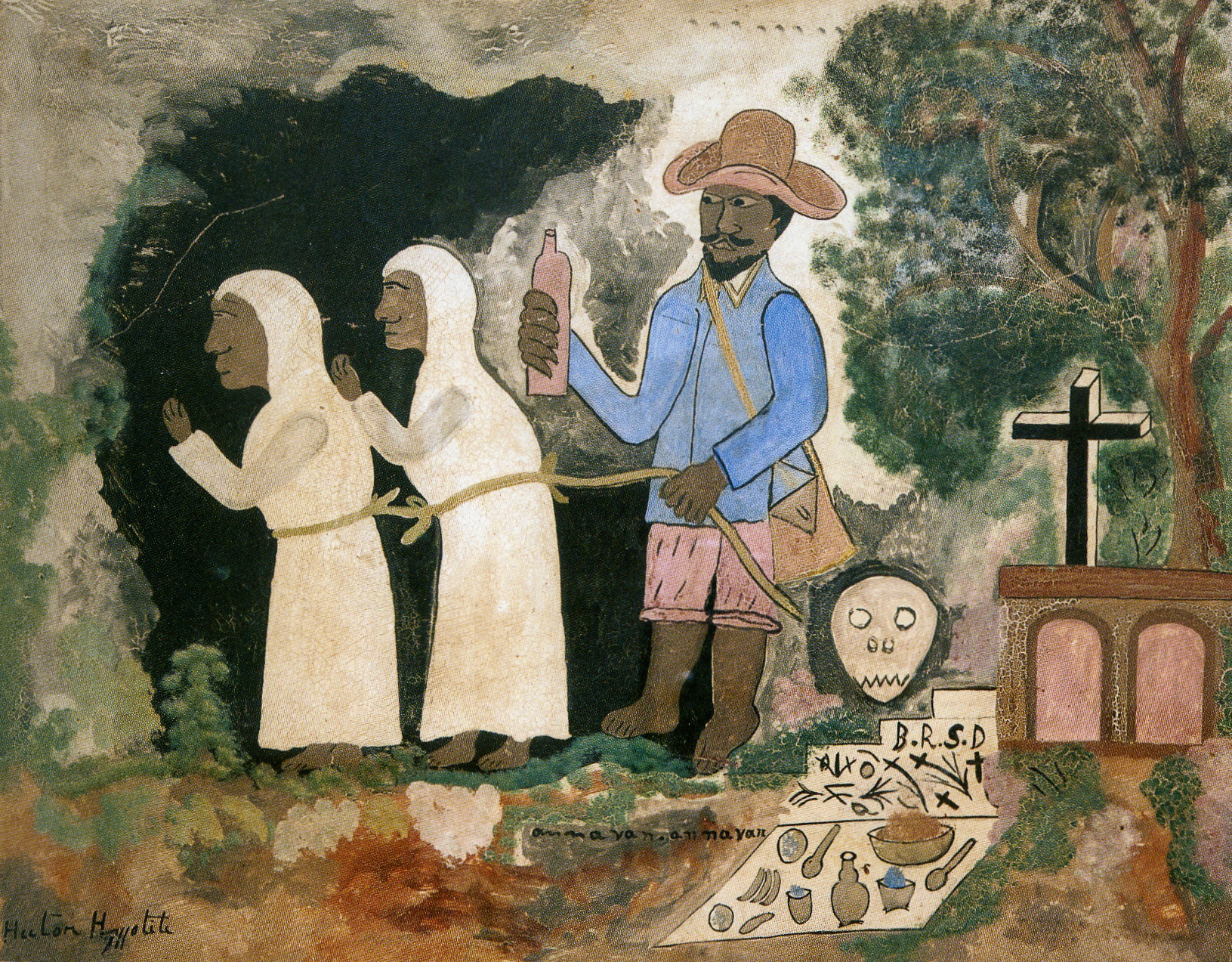
Hector Hyppolite's 1946 painting Vol de Zombis portrays a man controlling two zombis

Another belief about the dead, that of zonbis, is one of the most sensationalized aspects of Haitian religion. Zonbi are often regarded as the gwo bonnanj of the recently deceased that have been captured and forced to work for their master. The gwo bonnanj may then be kept inside a bottle or other vessel. The practice is often linked to Chanpwèl (secret societies), which are suspected of murdering the individual they wish to turn into a zonbi. To achieve this, they may obtain the bones of a deceased person, especially their skull, sometimes by bribing cemetery workers; the skull will often be baptised, given food, and set a particular task to specialise in, such as healing a specific malady. Those intending to take a gwo bonnanj as a zonbi may have to borrow or buy them from Baron Samedi.

An alternative idea in Haitian lore is that it is the body that is turned into a zonbi, in which case a bòkò has seized an individual's ti bonnanj and left the body as an empty vessel that can be manipulated. The reality of this phenomenon is contested, although the anthropologist Wade Davis argued that this was based on a real practice whereby Bizango societies used poisons to make certain individuals more pliant. Haitians generally do not fear zonbis, but rather fear becoming one themselves. The figure of the zonbi has also been interpreted as a metaphor for the enslavement central to Haitian history.

=== Festival ===
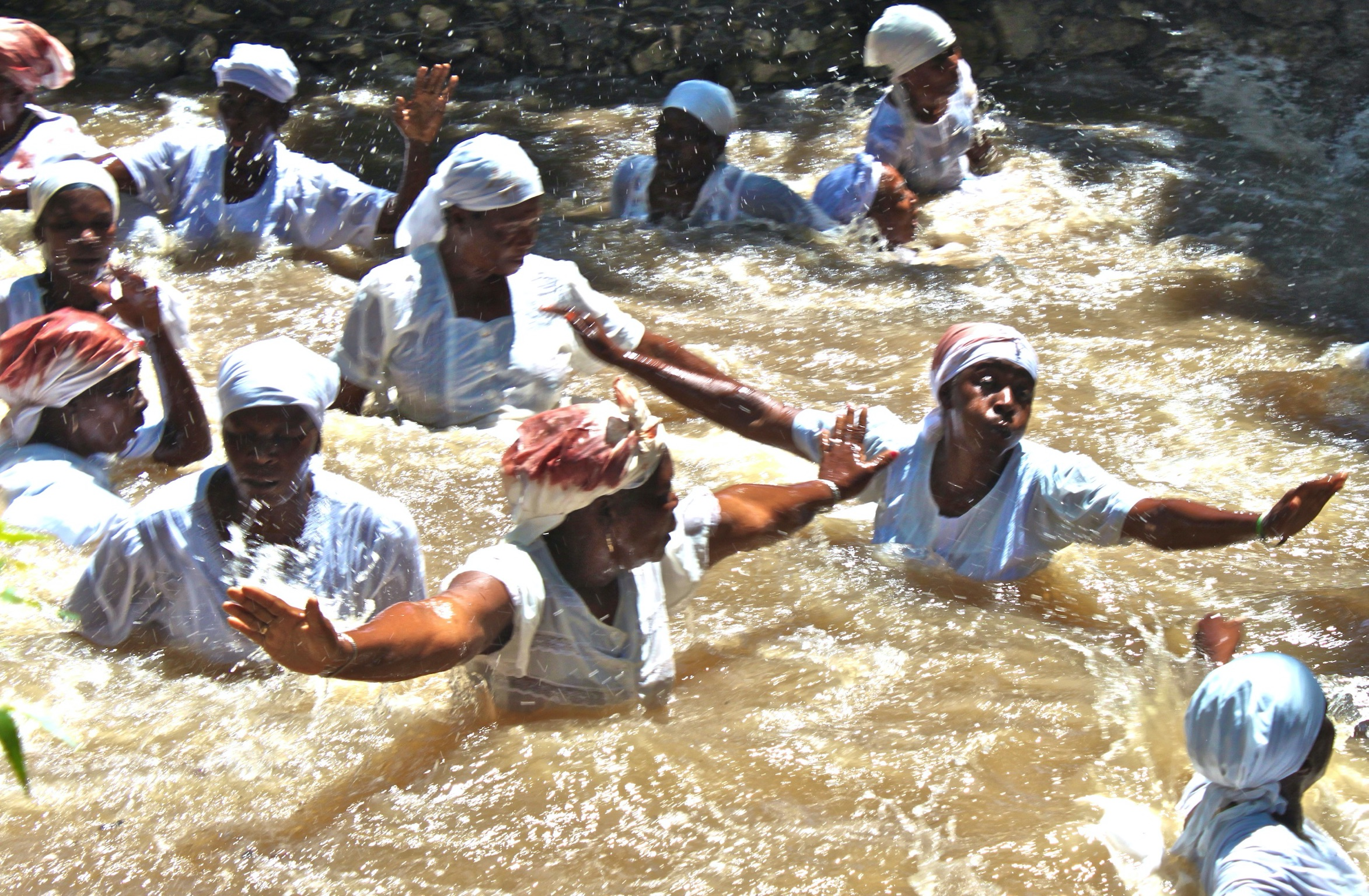
Vodouists washing in a river following a ceremony; photographed in Haiti in 2010

On the saints' days of the Roman Catholic calendar, Vodouists often hold "birthday parties" for the lwa associated with the saint whose day it is. These are marked with special altars for the celebrated lwa, as well as the preparation of their preferred food. Devotions to the Gede are particularly common around the days of the dead, All Saints (1 November) and All Souls (2 November), with celebrations largely taking place in the cemeteries of Port-au-Prince. At this festival, those devoted to the Gede dress in black and purple, with funeral frock coats, black veils, and top hats, all linking to the Gede's associations with death.

The build-up to Easter sees Rara bands, largely consisting of peasants and the urban poor, process through the streets singing and dancing. Each Rara band is considered to be under the patronage of a particular lwa, holding a contract with them that typically lasts seven years. Performing Rara is regarded as a service to the lwa, and some Rara leaders claim that a lwa instructed them to form their band. An oungan will typically be part of the Rara band and will oversee their religious obligations, for instance performing rituals during their procession, or providing members with a benyen protective bath before they perform. They may also attempt to curse or poison rival Rara bands.

=== Pilgrimage ===
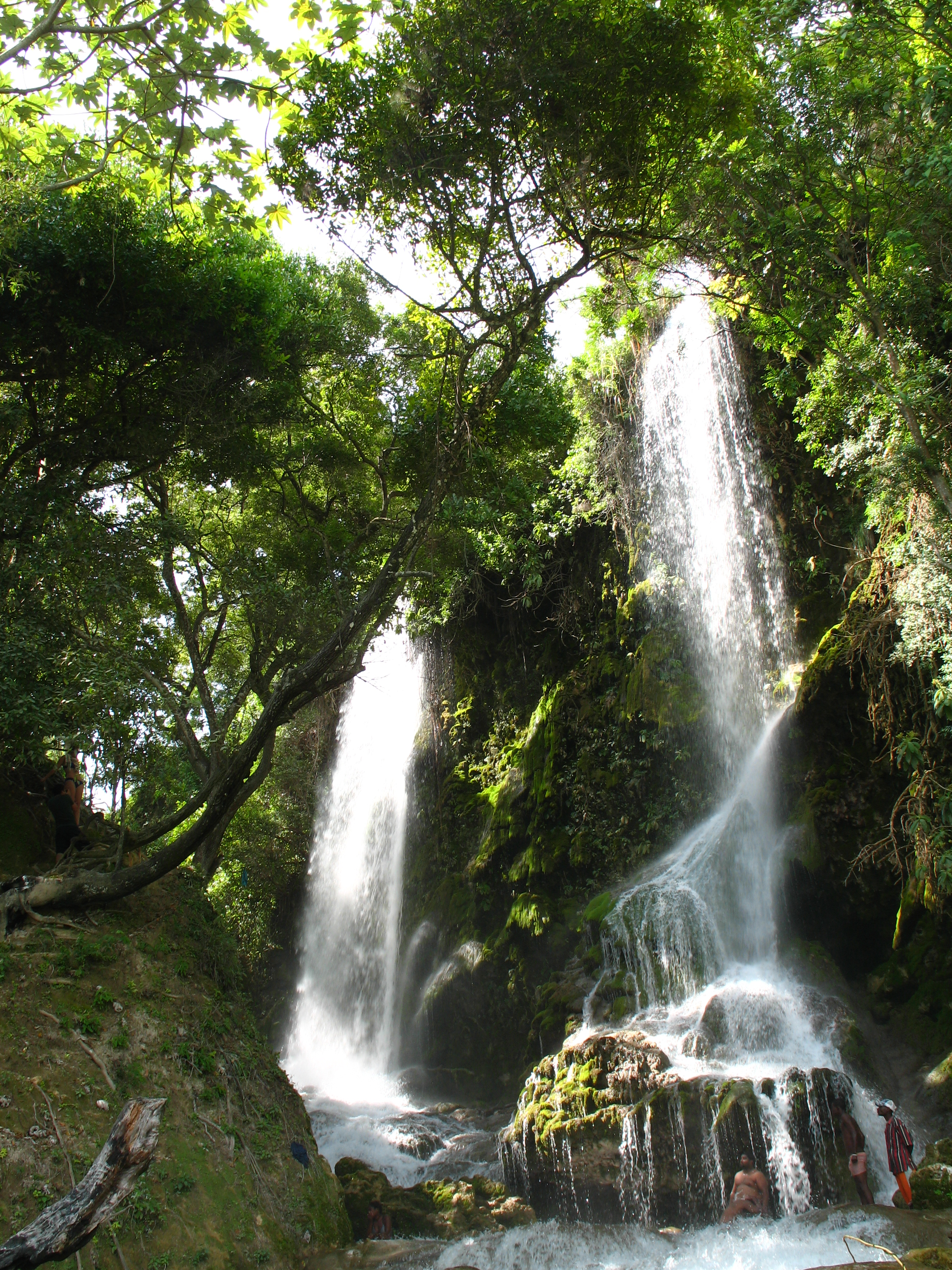
The Saut d'Eau, a popular pilgrimage site for Vodouists

Pilgrimage is part of Haitian religious culture. In July, Vodouist pilgrims visit Plaine du Nord near Bwa Caiman, where according to legend the Haitian Revolution began. There, sacrifices are made and pilgrims bathe in the twou (mud pits). The pilgrims gather before the Church of Saint Jacques; Saint Jacques represents the lwa Ogou. Another popular pilgrimage site, again typically visited in July, is Saut d'Eau ("waterfall") or Sodo, located outside the village of Ville-Bonheur where the Virgin Mary (Èzili) allegedly appeared in the 1840s. At the site, pilgrims bathe under waterfalls associated with water-spirits like Danbala.

Haitian pilgrims commonly wear coloured ropes around their head or waist; a tradition that may derive from a Bakongo custom, kanga ("to tie"), during which sacred objects were bound with rope. Haitians abroad have also established pilgrimage sites, with thousands of Haitians visiting the Church of Our Lady of Mount Carmel in East Harlem, New York City for the feast day of the Virgin, whom the Vodouists in attendance interpret as Èzili Dantò.

== History ==
=== Before the Revolution ===
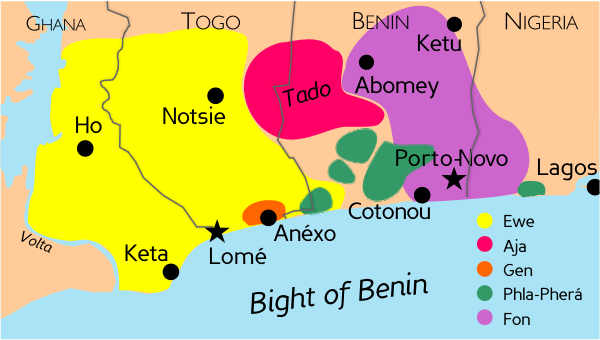
Area of West African Vodun practice, the religion with the greatest influence on Haitian Vodou

In 1492, Christopher Columbus' expedition established a Spanish colony on Hispaniola. After the island's Taíno population was decimated, European colonists began importing West African slaves as a source of labor circa 1512. Some would have been priests of African traditional religions; others would have already absorbed Roman Catholic influences, or were Muslim.

In 1697, a series of treaties led Spain to cede western Hispaniola to France, with the new French colony becoming Saint-Domingue. In the 18th century, Saint-Domingue refocused its economy around the mass export of indigo, coffee, sugar, and cocoa to Europe, resulting in the substantial import of enslaved African labor. Roman Catholicism was Saint-Domingue's official religion, with the French Code Noir of 1685 forbidding the open practice of African religions. This Code compelled slave-owners to have their slaves baptised and instructed as Roman Catholics, although many slave-owners were reluctant, not wanting their slaves to have time off for saints' days and fearing that black congregations could provide scope to foment revolt.

Enslavement destroyed the social fabric of African traditional religions, which were typically rooted in ethnic and family membership. Although certain assumptions about the nature of the universe would have been widely shared among enslaved Africans, they spoke diverse languages and had to forge common cultural practices on Hispaniola. African-derived rituals occurred in secret, usually at night; one rite was described in the 1790s by a white observer, Médéric Louis Élie Moreau de Saint-Méry. Often, Roman Catholic iconography and ritual was probably used to conceal the identity of the deities venerated, resulting in a system of correspondences between African spirits and Catholic saints. Afro-Haitians adopted other aspects of French colonial culture, with Vodou being influenced by European grimoires, commedia performances, and the Freemasonic lodges that were established in 18th-century Saint-Domingue.

=== The Haitian Revolution and the 19th century ===
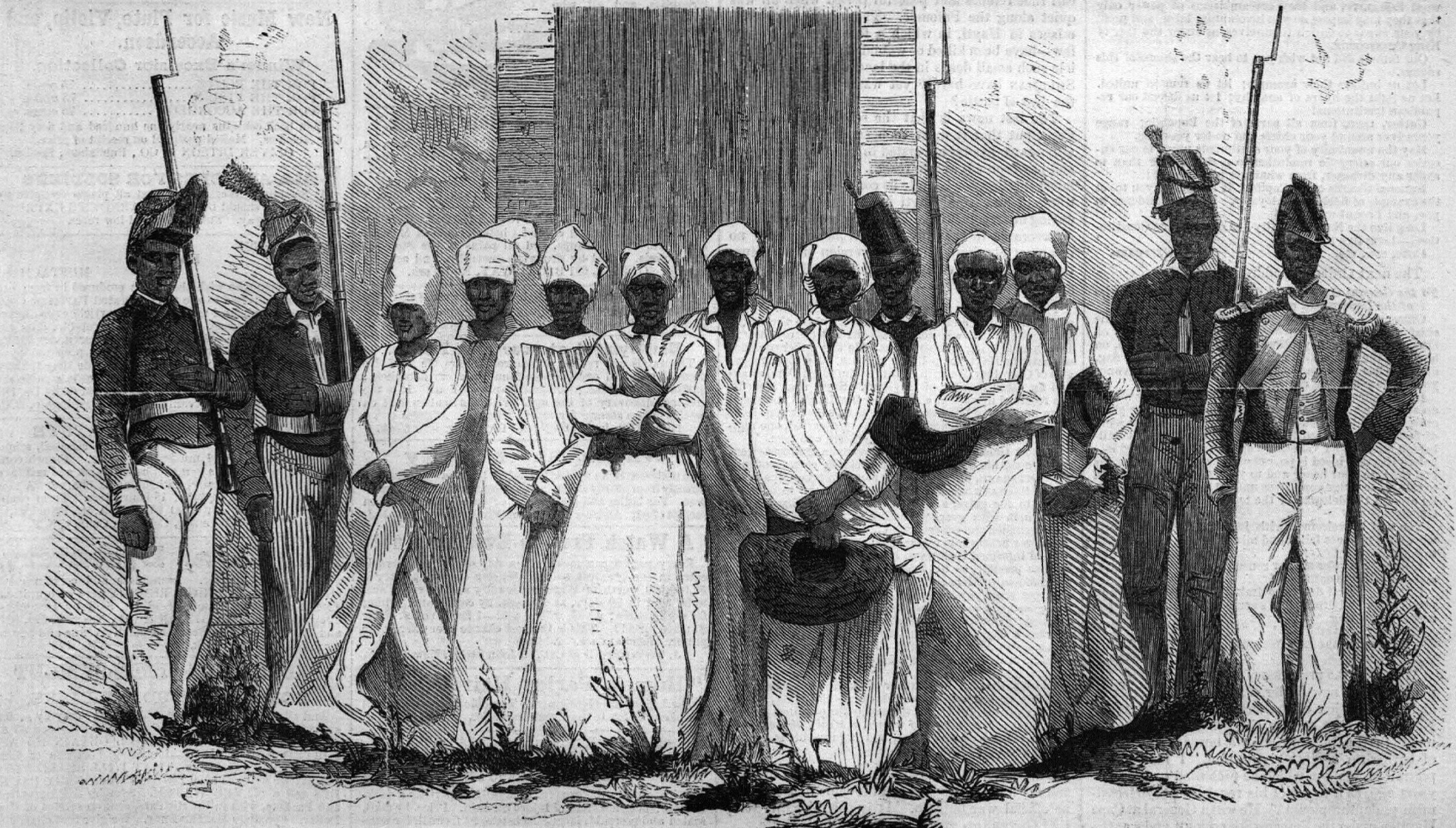
The Affaire de Bizoton of 1864. The murder and alleged cannibalization of a child by eight Vodou devotees caused a scandal worldwide.

Although historians debate the veracity of such claims, Haitian folklore commonly presents Vodou as having played a vital role in the Haitian Revolution. According to legend, the Revolution was sparked by a 1791 Vodou ritual at Bois-Caïman, while the early revolutionaries Boukman and Francois Mackandal were oungans. Amid growing rebellion, France ordered troops into the colony in 1801, but conceded defeat in 1803, with rebel leader Jean-Jacques Dessalines proclaiming Saint-Domingue to be a new republic, Haiti.

The Revolution created a society of small subsistence farmers. Haitians largely began living in lakous, or extended family compounds, which often had their own lwa rasin ("root lwa"). The Roman Catholic Church cut ties with Haiti in 1805, only returning in 1860. This absence allowed Vodou to predominate, and, with no new arrivals from Africa, the religion began to stabilise. It nevertheless faced continued opposition from Haiti's first three presidents, who feared Vodou rituals as a source of rebellion. Much attention was given to the Bizoton Affair of 1863, in which several Vodou practitioners were accused of ritually killing a child before eating it. They confessed, possibly under torture, and were executed.

=== 20th century to the present ===
The United States occupied Haiti between 1915 and 1934. This facilitated international interest in Vodou, reflected in Vodou-themed tourist shows, and in writings by Faustin Wirkus and William Seabrook. The occupation saw an increasingly positive assessment of Vodou among the indigénisme (indigenist) movement of Haiti's middle-classes, followed by professional ethnological research on the topic. Conversely, in 1941, Haiti's government launched Operation Nettoyage (Operation Cleanup), a Church-backed campaign to destroy many ounfòs. A more positive approach to Vodou followed after François Duvalier became Haiti's president; he hailed Vodou as "the supreme factor of Haitian unity", encouraged rumors about his own supernatural powers, and selected oungans as his chefs-de-sections (rural section chiefs).

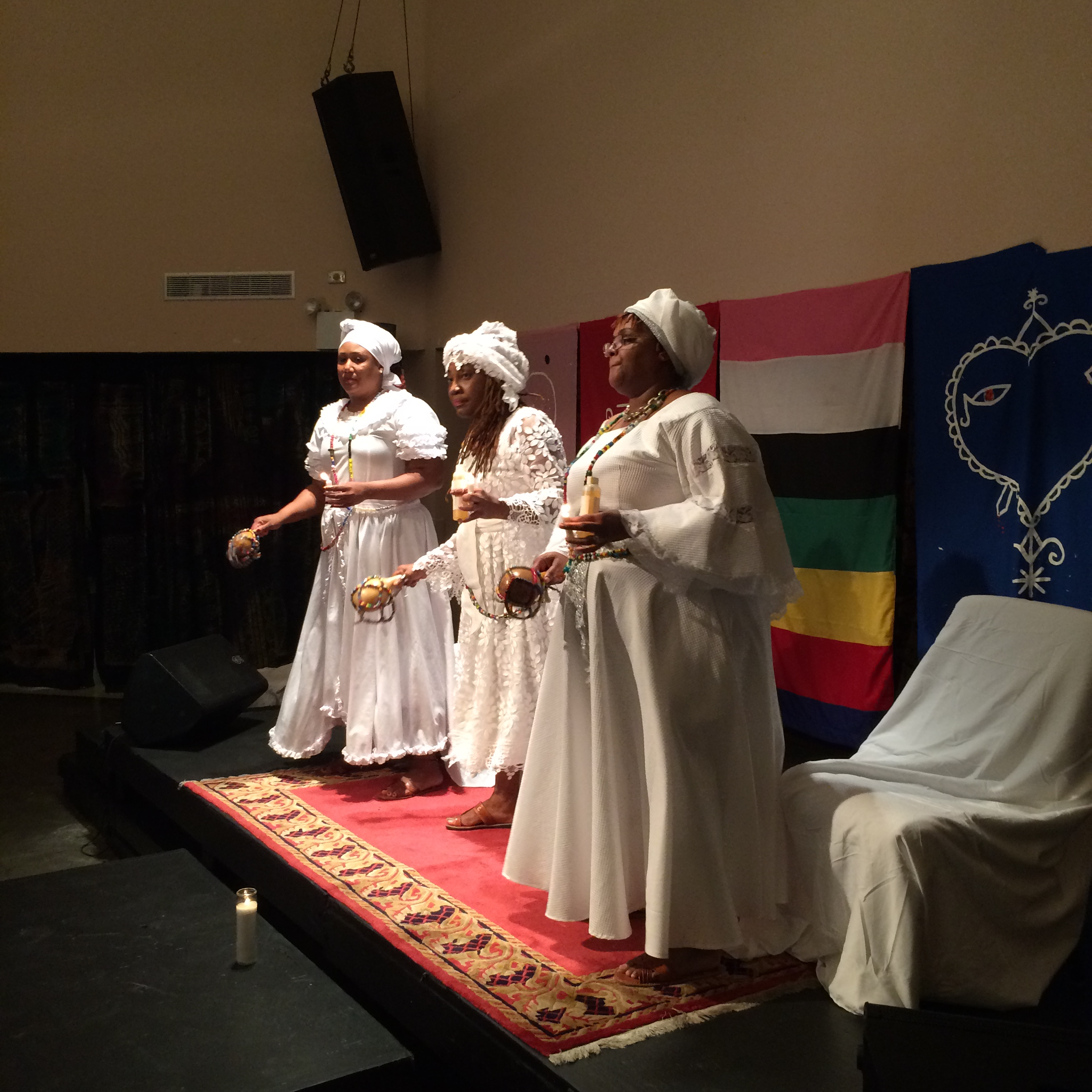
A Vodou ceremony taking place at the National Black Theatre in New York City in 2017

The latter half of the 20th century saw rising tensions between Vodouists and Haiti's growing numbers of Protestant Evangelicals. Protestant anti-Vodou campaigns contributed to attacks on Vodouists following the overthrow of President Jean-Claude Duvalier in 1986. Many Protestants also claimed that Vodou was partly to blame for the 2010 Haiti earthquake, with further mob attacks targeting Vodouists in the wake of the disaster.

Responding to growing hostility, Vodouists formed the civil rights groups Zantray and Bode Nasyonal. Haiti's 1987 constitution enshrined freedom of religion, after which President Jean-Bertrand Aristide granted Vodou official recognition in 2003. Vodou also spread abroad. The early 20th century saw growing Haitian migration take Vodou to eastern Cuba, while later migrants introduced it to the U.S. There, Vodou attracted non-Haitians, especially African Americans and Caribbean migrants, syncretized with religions like Santería and Spiritism, and contributed to the New Orleans Voodoo Revival.

== Demographics ==
Many Vodouists interpret Haiti's flag through their own theology; in this view, the blue is for Ezili Dantò, and the red for Ogou Feray.

Vodou is the majority religion of Haiti, for most Haitians practice both Vodou and Roman Catholicism. An often used joke about Haiti holds that the island's population is 85% Roman Catholic, 15% Protestant, and 100% Vodou. Even some Haitians who reject Vodou acknowledge its close associations with Haitian identity.

It is difficult to determine how many Haitians practice Vodou, largely because the country has never had an accurate census and many Vodouists will not openly admit to practicing the religion. Among the country's middle and upper-classes, for instance, many individuals publicly decry Vodou yet privately practice it. Estimates have nevertheless been made; in 1992, Desmangles put the number of Haitian practitioners at six million. Several scholars have suggested that Haitian religion could be seen as a continuum with Vodou on one end and Roman Catholicism at the other, but with most Haitians operating between the two, undergoing Roman Catholic rites of passage but turning to Vodou in times of crisis.

Vodouists learn about the religion by taking part in its rituals, with children learning by observing adults. Vodou does not focus on proselytizing; according to Brown, it has "no pretensions to the universal". It has nevertheless spread beyond Haiti; amid the Revolution, many Haitians fled to Louisiana, where their Vodou contributed to the development of Louisiana Voodoo. Since then, Vodou has spread to other Caribbean countries like the Dominican Republic, Cuba, and Puerto Rico, as well as to Western nations such as France, Canada, and the United States. Major ounfòs exist in U.S. cities like Miami, Oakland, Boston, New York City, and Washington, D.C..

== Reception and legacy ==
Various scholars describe Vodou as one of the world's most maligned and misunderstood religions. Throughout Haitian history, Christians have often presented Vodou as Satanic, while in broader Anglophone and Francophone society it has been widely associated with sorcery, witchcraft, and black magic. In U.S. popular culture, for instance, Haitian Vodou is usually portrayed as destructive and malevolent. Non-practitioners have often depicted Vodou in literature, theater, and film; in many cases, such as the films White Zombie (1932) and London Voodoo (2004), these sensationalise the religion. The lack of any central Vodou authority has hindered efforts to combat these negative representations.

Humanity's relationship with the lwa has been a recurring theme in Haitian art, and the Vodou pantheon was a major topic for the mid-20th century artists of the "Haitian Renaissance". In the late 1950s, art collectors began to show interest in Vodou ritual paraphernalia and by the 1970s an established market for this material had emerged. Exhibits of Vodou ritual material have been displayed abroad; the Fowler Museum's exhibit on "Sacred Arts of Haitian Vodou" for instance traveled the U.S. for three years in the 1990s. Vodou has appeared in Haitian literature, and has also influenced Haitian music, as with the rasin band Boukman Eksperyans, while theatre troupes have performed simulated Vodou rituals for audiences outside Haiti. Documentaries about Vodou have appeared—such as Maya Deren's Divine Horsemen (1954)—which have in turn encouraged some viewers toward a practical interest in the religion.

== See also ==
- Haitian mythology
- Haitian Vodou art
- Voodoo in popular culture
