= Glassman =

Glassman is a surname. Notable people with the surname include:

- Al Glassman, former member of Canadian band Despised Icon
- Andrew Glassman, American television producer and founder of Glassman Media
- Barry Glassman (born 1962), American state politician
- Bernie Glassman (1939–2018), American Zen Buddhist roshi
- Betty Glassman Trachtenberg (1933–2023), American college administrator
- Caroline Duby Glassman (1922–2013), American jurist
- Cynthia Glassman, American government official
- Frank Glassman (1908–1996), American football player
- Gary Glassman, American documentary filmmaker
- Greg Glassman, inventor of CrossFit
- Harry P. Glassman (1928–1981), American jurist
- Howard Glassman (born 1960), Canadian radio personality
- James K. Glassman (born 1947), American libertarian conservative editorialist, journalist and author
- Jeff Glassman, American theatrical actor
- Jon D. Glassman (born 1944), Former .S. State Dept. Official famous for writing El Salvador "White Paper" advocating U.S. intervention in Nicaragua
- Joyce Glassman, birth name of Joyce Johnson (author) (born 1935), American writer
- Newton Glassman, Canadian private equity manager
- Rick Glassman (born 1984), American actor and comedian
- Sallie Ann Glassman (born 1954), American practitioner of Vodou
- Shira Glassman, American fantasy writer
- Tetsugen Bernard Glassman (1939–2018), American roshi and pioneer in the American Zen Movement

== See also ==
- Glasman
- Justice Glassman
- Jacques Glassmann
- Rex Glassman, nickname for Rex Grossman (born 1980), American football player
