= Louis Martinié =

American vodou practitioner

Louis Martinié is an author, "internationally known" percussionist, practitioner of a multitude of religions among them being New Orleans style Voodoo, and co-author of the book New Orleans VooDoo Tarot (1992), with Sallie Ann Glassman.

He is a priest and drummer with the New Orleans Voodoo Spiritual Temple, and a primary drummer for the rituals of Priestess Miriam Chamani

He is a leader of the band of drummers known as the Krewe of Nutria, who have drummed for the ritual shows of the New Orleans Historic Voodoo Museum. He is also the editor and a founder of Black Moon Publishing.

== Bibliography ==
=== Books ===
- Agwe et Babylon: Cultus Marassa (1983)
- New Orleans VooDoo Tarot (1992) Louis Martinie' and Sallie Ann Glassman, Destiny Books ISBN 0-89281-363-6
- Voodoo at the Cafe Puce (2005) Louis Martinie' and Severina K.M. Singh. Logan, OH: Black Moon Publishing ISBN 1-890399-21-3
- Waters of Return: Aeonic VooDoo (1994) Louis Martinie', Black Moon Publishing ISBN 1-890399-03-5
- A Priest's Head, A Drummer's Hands (2010) Black Moon Publishing ISBN 978-1-890399-24-5
- Cincinnati Journal of Ceremonial Magick (1976) by Bate Cabal Associations Staff; Editor: Louis Martinie', Illustrated by Samekh 277, Black Moon Publishing, ISBN 978-1890399009

=== Journals ===
- The Practitioner, The Priest, and The Professor: Perspectives on Self-Initiation in the American Neopagan Community (With Marty Laubach and Roselinda Clemons), Journal for the Academic Study of Magic (Volume 4) 2007, edited by D. Green, S. Graf, A. Hale
- Archived articles by Louis Martinie'

== Discography ==
- Festival and Ritual Drumming: Evoking the Sacred through Rhythms of the Spirit (1993) Mishlen Linden and Louis Martinie'. Destiny Recordings ISBN 1-59477-072-7

== Interviews ==
- Living the Wiccan Life, Episode 27, Pt. 1 - Louis Martinié of the New Orleans Voodoo Spiritual Temple - Interview with Louis Martinié' by Rev. Don Lewis of the Witch School at the WinterStar Symposium (2008)
- Voodoo Drumming - Interview by Heather Kyle of Louis Martinie' and Utu (of Niagara Voodoo Shrine) and demonstration of the drumming for the "Order of Service" - recorded at the 2007 Starwood Festival: Pt. 1 , Pt. 2
