= New Orleans Voodoo Revival =

Period in New Orleans

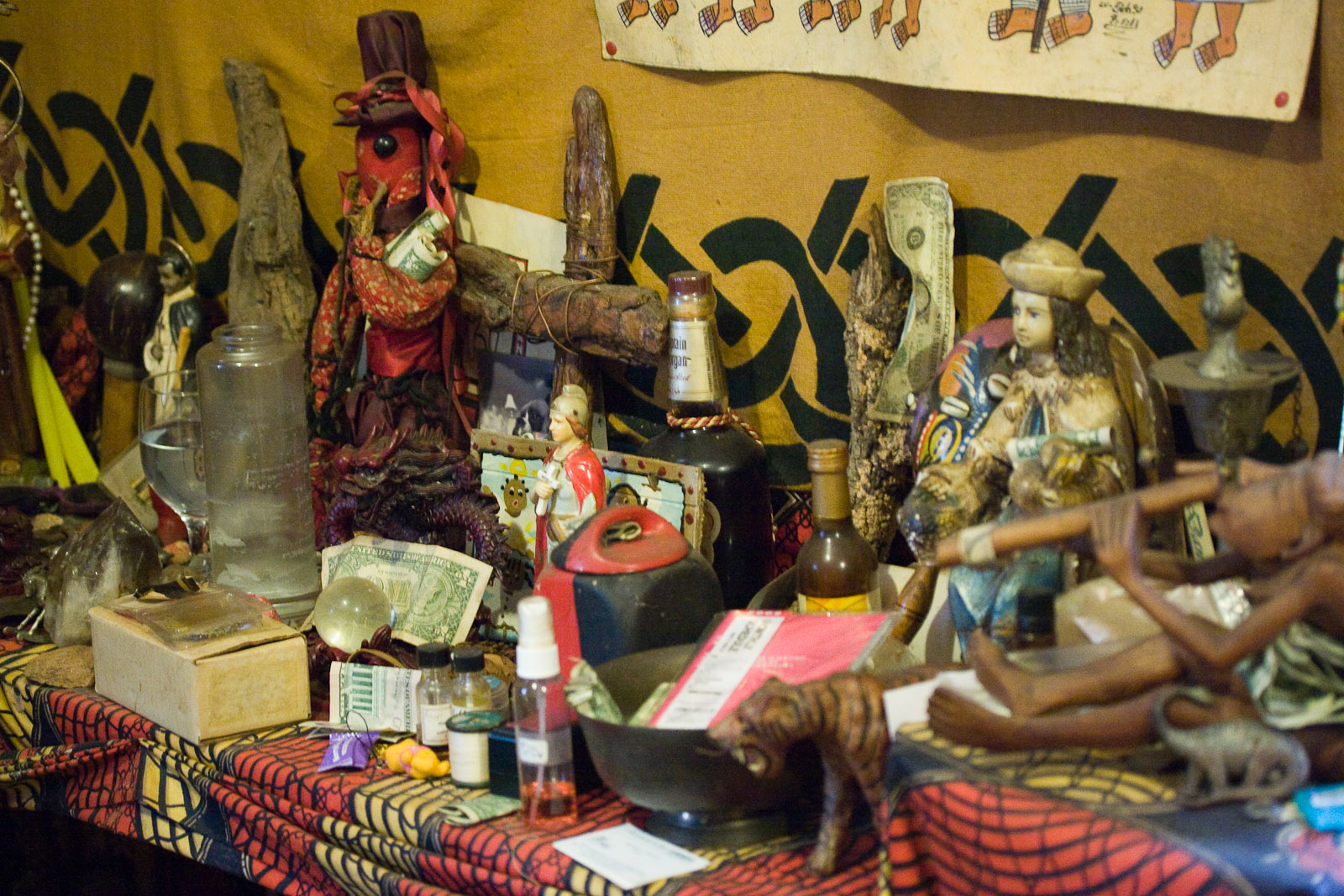
An altar used in Louisiana Voodoo, on display in the French Quarter of New Orleans

In New Orleans, Louisiana, various groups practicing African diasporic religions have established since the closing decades of the 20th century. Although usually practicing versions of Haitian Vodou or Cuban Santería, they have largely adopted the term "Voodoo" in reference to Louisiana Voodoo, the religion present in that region from the 18th to the early 20th century.

During the Atlantic slave trade of the 16th to the 19th century, West and Central Africans were forcibly transplanted to the Americas, where their traditional religions syncretized with Christianity and other non-African influences to develop new traditions, such as Haitian Vodou or Cuban Santería. In Louisiana, a tradition commonly termed Voodoo emerged and survived into the early 20th century, at which point it died out, although some vernacular traditions persevered as Hoodoo. After the 1960s, the New Orleans tourist industry increasingly used references to Voodoo to attract visitors, while a Voodoo revival took place, the practitioners of which often drew heavily on other African diasporic religions.

The New Orleans Voodoo Revival differs from historical Louisiana Voodoo in various respects. Rather than venerating the deities historically venerated in Louisiana, it often focuses attention on the lwa, spirits found in Haitian Vodou.

== History ==
In the late 20th century there was a revival of Louisiana Voodoo, creating a tradition that "more closely resembles" Haitian Vodou and Cuban Santería than the 19th-century Louisiana Voodoo that is described in historical accounts. Some 21st-century practitioners have also sought instruction from West African traditions, for instance, being initiated into West African Vodun. Author Jeffery Anderson deemed the link between the historical tradition and the revivalist practices to be "quite tenuous", stating that "today's New Orleans Voodoo" is "an emerging faith inspired by and seeking to reconstruct the older religion".

Various groups emerged; in 1990 the African American priestess Miriam Chamani established the Voodoo Spiritual Temple in the French Quarter, which venerated deities from Haitian Vodou and Cuban Santería. A Ukrainian-Jewish American initiate of Haitian Vodou, Sallie Ann Glassman, launched another group, La Source Ancienne, in the Bywater neighborhood; she also operated the Island of Salvation Botanica store. The most publicly prominent of the new Voodoo practitioners was Ava Kay Jones, a Louisiana Creole woman who had been initiated into both Haitian Vodou and Orisha-Vodu, a U.S.-based derivative of Santería. Scholar Carolyn Long believed that these groups reflected a "Voodoo revival" rather than a direct continuation of 18th and 19th century traditions; she noted that this new Voodoo typically resembled Haitian Vodou or Santería more than the 19th-century Louisiana Voodoo. These groups sought to promote understanding of their religion through websites, newsletters, and workshops.

In the 21st century, Voodoo practitioners have combined Voodoo with, for instance, elements of Judaism and the Kabbalah, or Hinduism.

== Beliefs ==
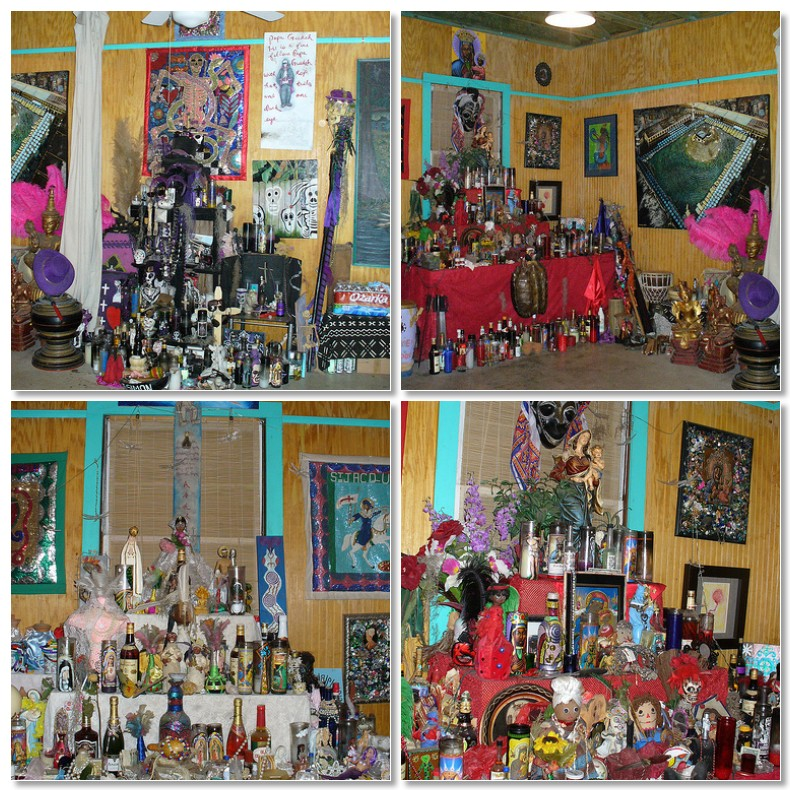
Altars constructed by Voodoo practitioner Sallie Ann Glassman in the Bywater area of New Orleans

The Voodoo revival of the late 20th century has drawn many of its deities from Haitian Vodou, where these divinities are called lwa. Among the lwa commonly venerated are Erzulie Freda Ezili la Flambo, Ogoun, Mara, and Papa Legba. These can be divided into separate nanchon (nations), such as the Rada and the Petwo. Glassman's New Orleans temple for instance has separate altars to the Rada and Petwo lwa. Each of these is associated with particular items, colors, numbers, foodstuff, and drinks. They are often considered to be intermediaries of God, who in Haitian Vodou is usually termed Le Bon Dieu.

In the 21st century, Louisiana Voodoo has been characterized as a system of ancestor worship. Communicating with the ancestors is an important part of its practice, with these ancestral spirits often invoked during ceremonies.

Writing in the 2010s, the Voodoo practitioner and poet Brenda Marie Osbey described a belief in "a somewhat distant but single deity" being part of the religion, while Rory O'Neill Schmitt and Rosary Hartel O'Neill expressed the belief that contemporary Voodoo was monotheistic. Rejecting the centrality of the saints for her 21st-century practice, Osbey has described these saints as "servants and messengers of the Ancestors." She related that, unlike in Haitian Vodou and Cuban Santería, the Roman Catholic saints retained their distinct identities rather than being equated with specific West African deities.

=== Morality, ethics, and gender roles ===
In its early 21st century form, Louisiana Voodoo accords particular respect to elders. Osbey described the religion as being "entirely within the sphere of women, whom we call Mothers."

== Practices ==
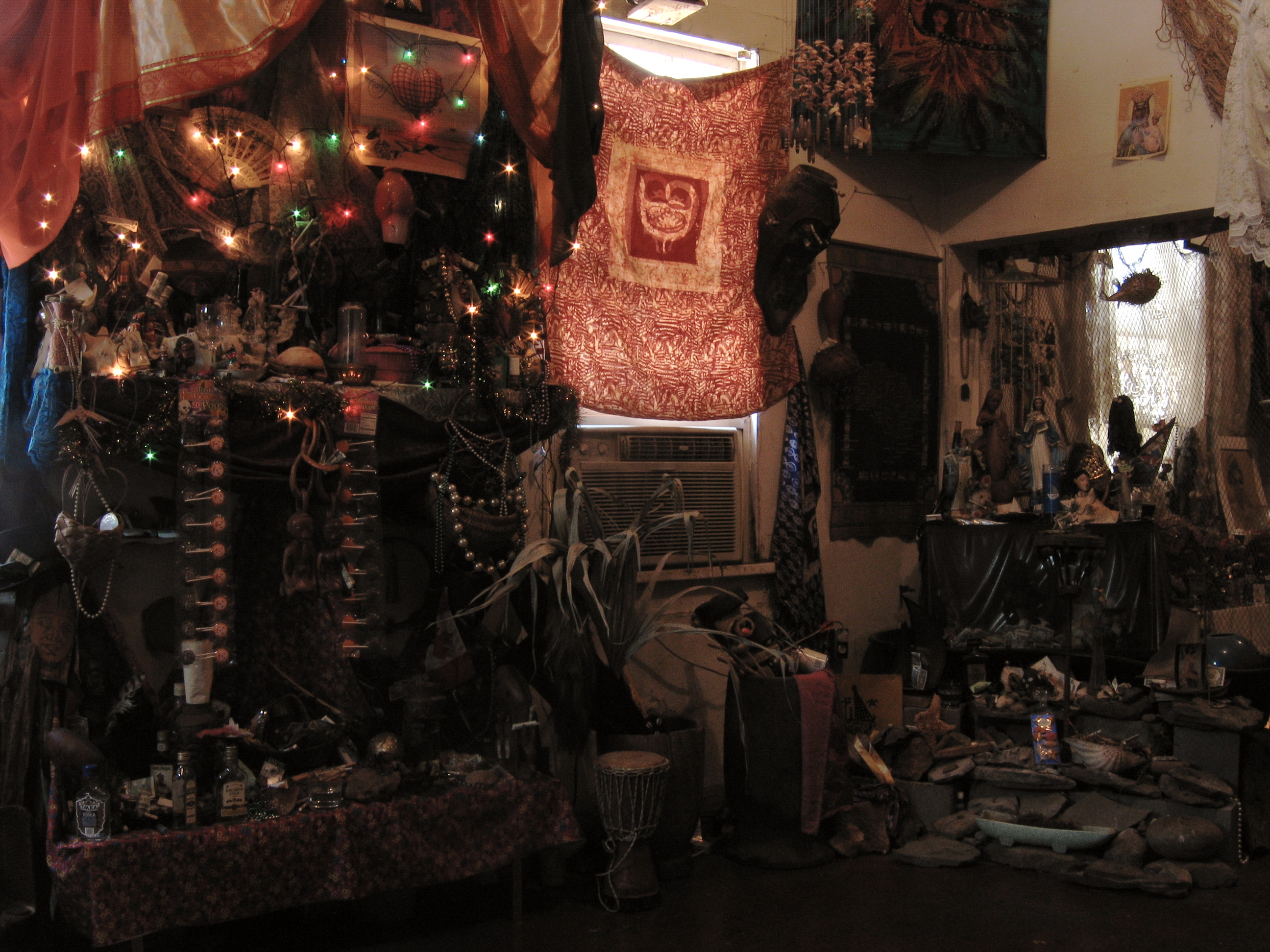
The interior of the Voodoo Spiritual Temple in New Orleans, photographed in 2005

In the 21st century, various Voodoo groups wear white clothing for their ceremonies. Influenced by Haitian Vodou, those assembled may dance around a central post, the poto mitan. Patterned flags, called drapos, may be brought out, while songs are sung in Haitian Kreyol. Drawings, called vèvè , may be made on the floor to invoke the spirits. Offerings will be given to the spirits. Contemporary Voodoo rites often entail calling spirits to enter the body of a practitioner, through which they can heal or confer blessings. The possessed individual will be called the "horse".

Practitioners sometimes performed rituals to deal with specific issues; in August 1995, Voodoo practitioners held a ritual in the Bywater area of New Orleans to try to drive away crack cocaine abuse, burglaries, prostitution, and assaults, while in 2001 the Voodoo priestess Ava Kay Jones performed a rite to drive harmful spirits away from the New Orleans Saints football team in the hope of improving their performance.

Many contemporary practitioners have their own personal altars, often located in the kitchen or living room. These altars are understood as assisting communication with ancestors, with food and drink being offered to the ancestors at them. Libations may be poured. Music is often a part of rituals.

Reflecting the fact that Louisiana Voodoo rituals historically often involved the presence of a snake; some Voodoo revivalists have incorporated snake dances into their practices. In the 21st century, the New Orleans Voodoo Spiritual Temple has had its own "temple snake."

Some 21st-century practitioners of Louisiana Voodoo do sacrifice animals in their rites, subsequently cooking and eating the carcass. It is nevertheless not a universal practice in Louisiana Voodoo; Glassman's group prohibits animal sacrifice in its rites.

Among some contemporary practitioners there is a tradition not to speak to non-adherents about Voodoo.

Healing plays a prominent role in 21st century Louisiana Voodoo. Various shops, called botanicas, exist in New Orleans to sell herbs and other material for use in these preparations.

Glassman has produced her own New Orleans Voodoo Tarot, a tarot card set for use in divination.

=== Communal festivals ===
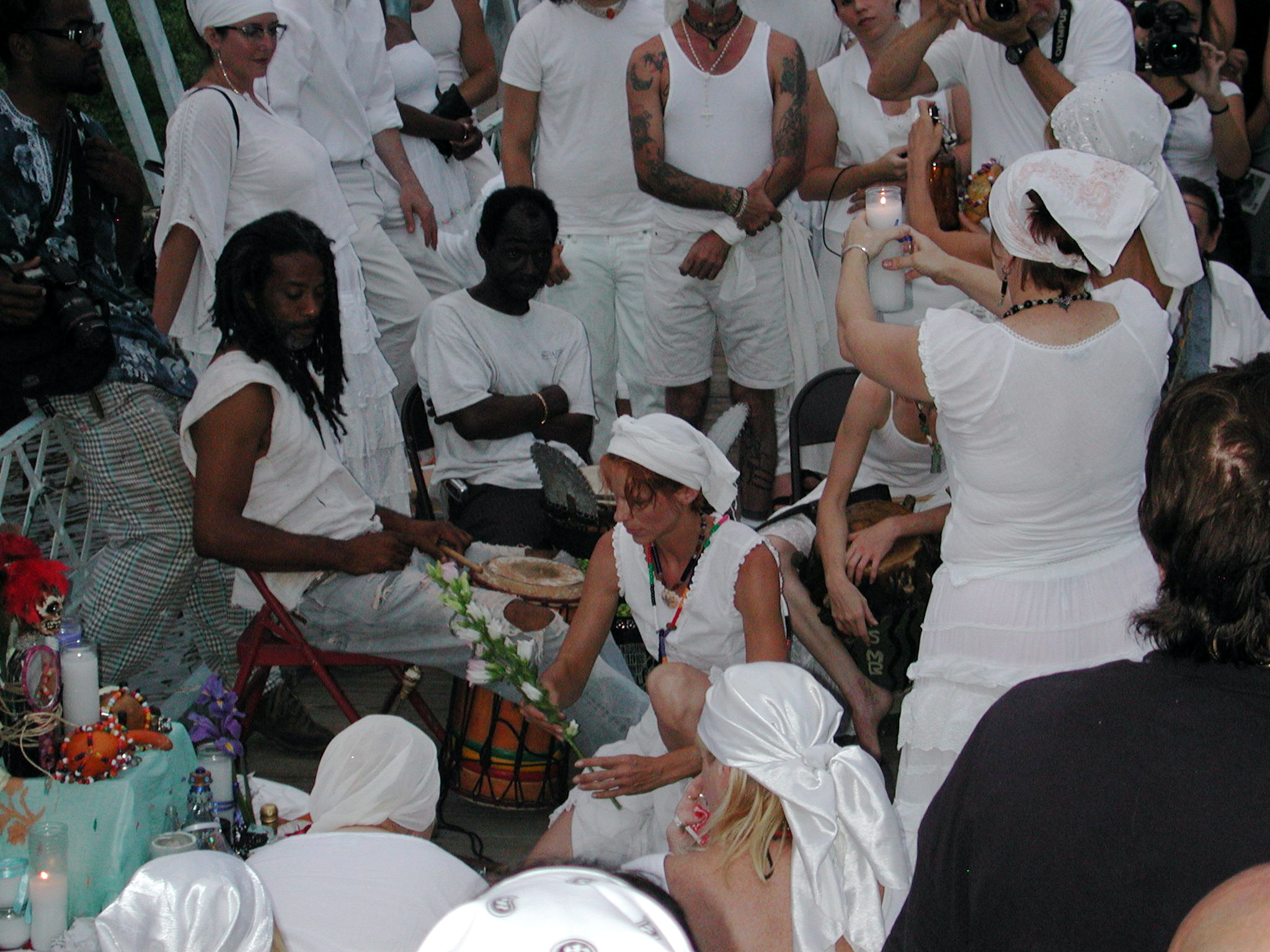
A Voodoo ritual in St. John's Bayou, New Orleans on St John's Eve 2007

A common gathering in historical Louisiana Voodoo was on the night of the 23 or 24 June, St John's Eve, with big celebrations on this date has taken place on the shores of Lake Pontchartrain during the 19th century. Some 21st-century Voodoo congregations continue to celebrate on St John's Eve; others, such as Osbey, reject the idea that St John's Eve is important in Louisiana Voodoo. Various contemporary practitioners celebrate All Saints Day (1 November) which they, following Haitian Vodou, link with the lwa Gede.

== Demographics ==
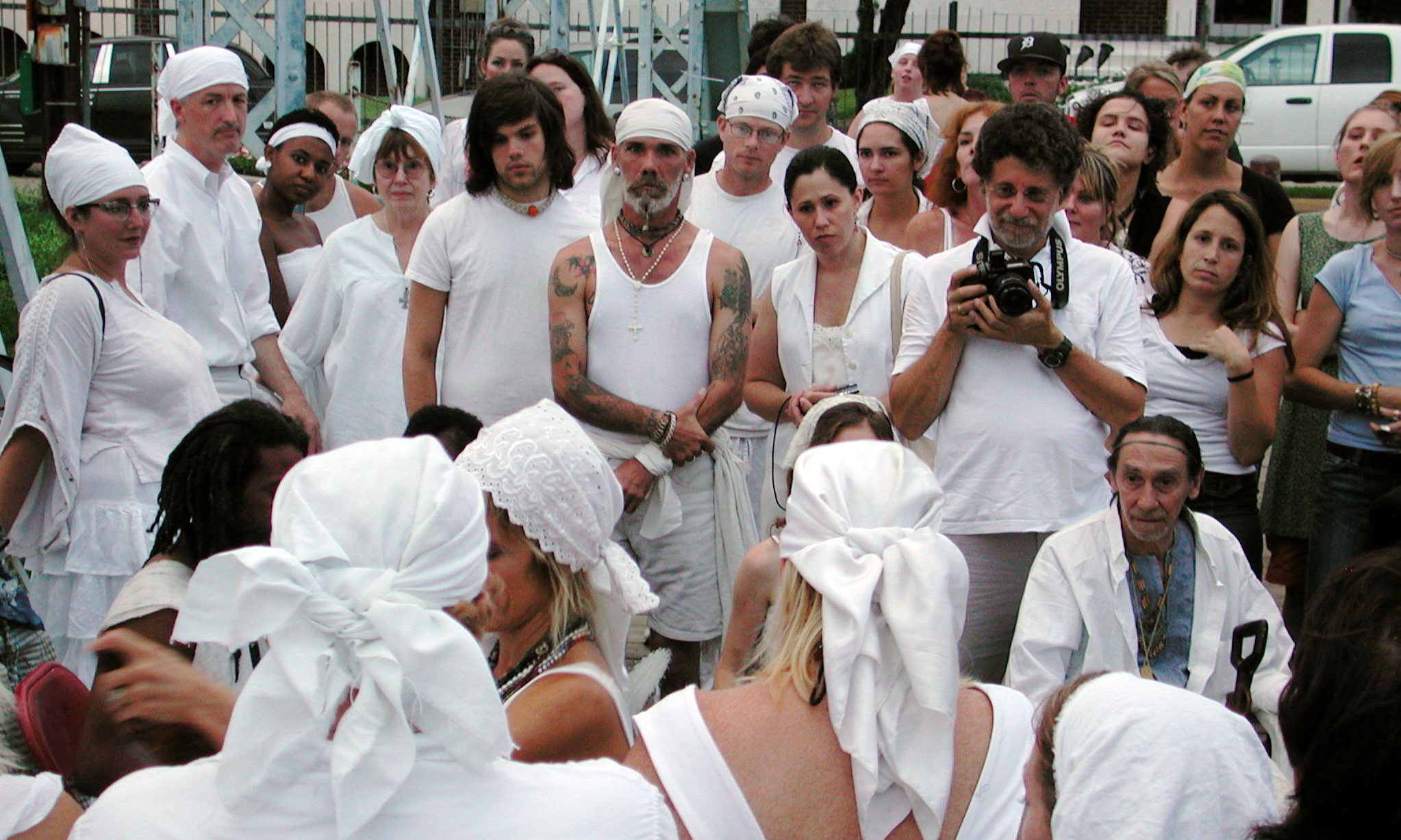
A group of Voodoo practitioners assembling at the Bayou St. John swing bridge on St John's Eve 2007

In 2014, Newsweek reported a claim—cited to "locals"—that there had been between 2,500 and 3,000 practitioners in New Orleans at the start of the 21st century, but that following Hurricane Katrina and the subsequent dispersal of much of the city's population, that number was down to under 300. Some children are born into families that already practice Louisiana Voodoo; others come to the religion on their own.

Carolyn Long noted that the "Voodoo revival" of the late 20th century had attracted many "well-educated" and middle-class Americans, both black and white. Glassman's group has been described as having a white-majority membership. In a 1995 article for The New York Times, Rick Bragg noted that many contemporary practitioners were "white people — nose and tongue piercers, middle-aged intellectuals and men with foot-long ponytails — who enjoy the religion's drumming and cultural aspects." Osbey thought that this revival was appealing, especially to "young-ish whites", because they felt it offered "something at once forbidden, magical and compelling in its dramatic appeal"; in her view they were not real practitioners of Louisiana Voodoo because they do not descend from the ancestral spirits that the religion venerates.
