= Glazman =

Glazman is a surname. Notable people with the surname include:

- Daniel Glazman (born 1967), French software developer
- Josef Glazman (1913–1943), Lithuanian Jewish resistance leader
- Leonid Glazman, Ukrainian-American theoretical physicist
- Roman Glazman, Russian-American physicist and oceanographer

== See also ==
- Glasman
- Glassman
