= Glasman =

Glasman is a surname. Notable people with the surname include:

- Baruch Glasman (1893-1945), Yiddish novelist, short story writer, and essayist
- Maurice Glasman, Baron Glasman (born 1961), English academic and peer
- Yaakov Glasman, rabbi and communal leader

== See also ==
- Glassman
- Glazman
