= Justice Glassman =

Justice Glassman may refer to:

- Caroline Duby Glassman (1922–2013), associate justice of the Maine Supreme Judicial Court
- Harry P. Glassman (1928–1981), associate justice of the Maine Supreme Judicial Court
