= History of Haitian Vodou =

The religion of Haitian Vodou emerged on the island of Hispaniola from the 15th and 16th centuries.

== Before the Revolution ==
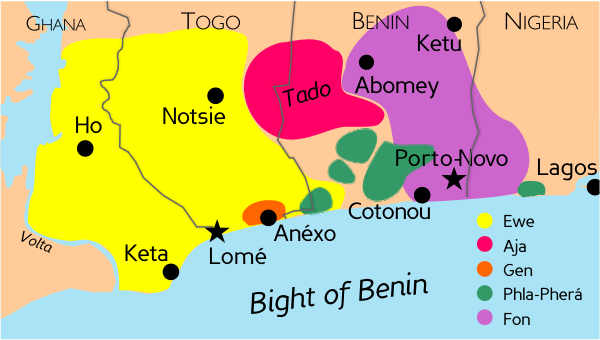
Area of West African Vodun practice, the religion with the greatest influence on Haitian Vodou

In 1492, Christopher Columbus' expedition established a Spanish colony on Hispaniola. A growing European presence decimated the island's Indigenous Taíno population, both through introduced diseases and exploitation as laborers. The European colonists then turned to imported West African slaves as a new source of labor; Africans first arrived on Hispaniola circa 1512. Most of the enslaved were prisoners of war. Some were probably priests of traditional religions, helping to transport their rites to the Americas. Others were probably Muslim, although Islam exerted little influence on Vodou, while some probably practiced traditional religions that had already absorbed Roman Catholic iconographic influences.

By the late 16th century, French colonists were settling in western Hispaniola; Spain recognized French sovereignty over that part of the island, which became Saint-Domingue, in a series of treaties signed in 1697. Moving away from its previous subsistence economy, in the 18th century Saint-Domingue refocused its economy around the mass export of indigo, coffee, sugar, and cocoa to Europe. To work the plantations, the French colonists placed a renewed emphasis on importing enslaved Africans; whereas there were twice as many Africans as Europeans in the colony in 1681, by 1790 there were eleven times as many Africans as Europeans. Ultimately, Saint-Domingue became the colony with the largest number of slaves in the Caribbean.

Roman Catholicism was the official religion of Saint-Domingue. The Code Noir issued by King Louis XIV in 1685 forbade the open practice of African religions on the colony. This Code compelled slave-owners to have their slaves baptised and instructed as Roman Catholics; the fact that the process of enslavement led to these Africans becoming Christian was a key way in which the slave-owners sought to morally legitimate their actions. However, many slave-owners took little interest in having their slaves instructed in Roman Catholic teaching; they often did not want their slaves to spend time celebrating saints' days rather than laboring and were also concerned that black congregations could provide scope to foment revolt.

Enslavement destroyed the social fabric of African traditional religions, which were typically rooted in ethnic and family membership. Although certain cultural assumptions about the nature of the universe would have been widely shared among the enslaved Africans, they came from diverse linguistic and ethno-cultural backgrounds and had to forge common cultural practices on Hispaniola. According to Desmangles, over the course of the 18th century Vodou gradually emerged as "a composite of various African ethnic traditions", merging diverse practices into a more cohesive form.

African religions had to be practiced secretly, with Roman Catholic iconography and rituals probably used to conceal the true identity of the deities venerated. This resulted in a system of correspondences between African spirits and Roman Catholic saints. Afro-Haitians adopted other aspects of French colonial culture; Vodou drew influence from European grimoires, commedia performances, and Freemasonry, with Masonic lodges having been established across Saint-Domingue in the 18th century. Vodou rituals took place in secret, usually at night; one such rite was described during the 1790s by a white man, Médéric Louis Élie Moreau de Saint-Méry. Some enslaved Afro-Haitians escaped to form Maroon groups, which often practiced Vodou.

== The Haitian Revolution and the 19th century ==
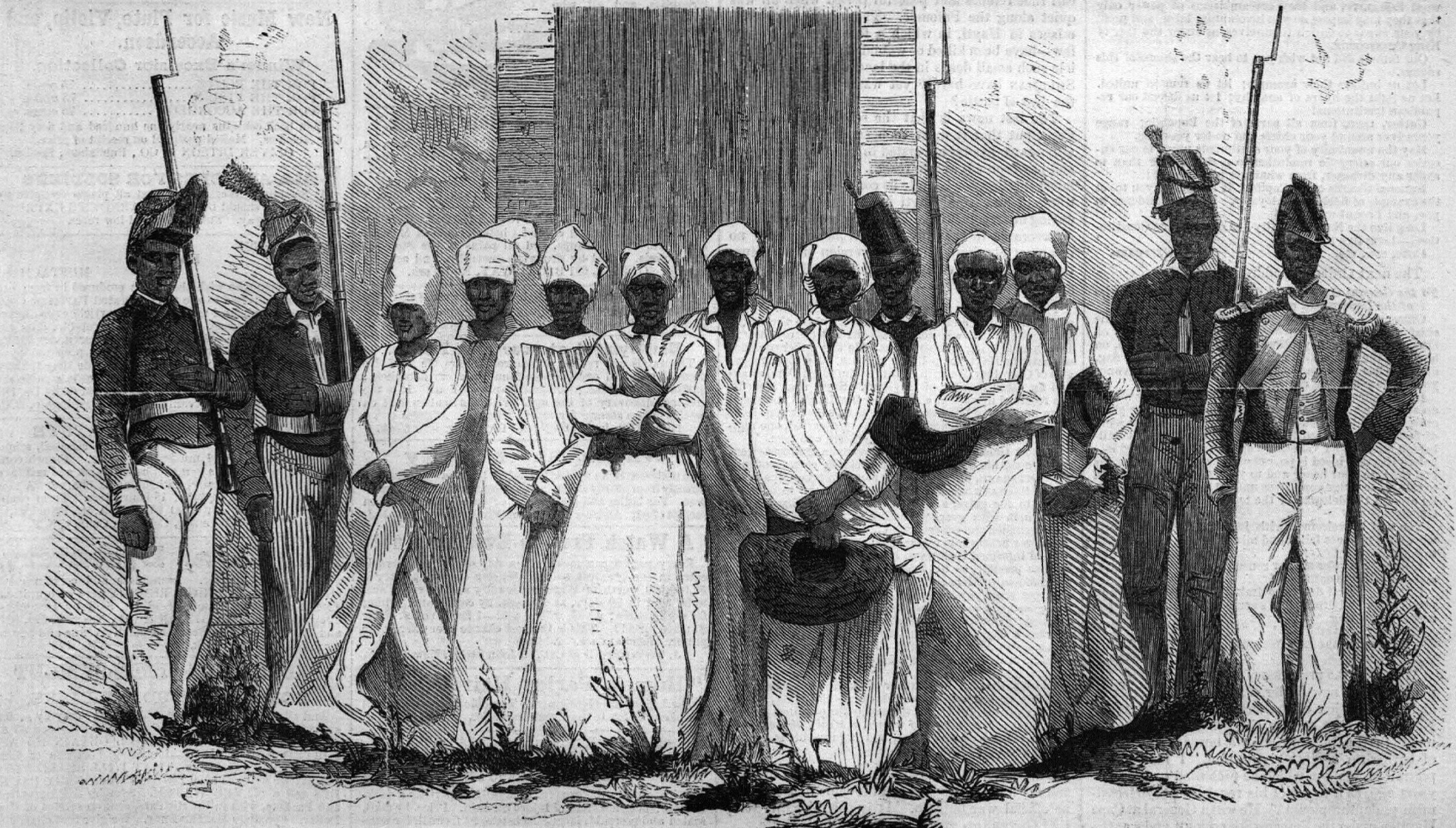
The Affaire de Bizoton of 1864. The murder and alleged cannibalization of a child by eight Vodou devotees caused a scandal worldwide and was taken as proof of the evil nature of Vodou.

In Haitian lore, Vodou is often presented as having played a vital role in the Haitian Revolution, although scholars debate the extent to which this is true. According to legend, a Vodou ritual took place in Bois-Caïman on 14 August 1791 at which the participants swore to overthrow the slave owners before massacring local whites and sparking the Revolution. Although a popular tale in Haitian folklore, it has no historical evidence to support it. Moreover, two of the revolution's early leaders, Boukman and Francois Mackandal, were reputed to be powerful oungans. Amid growing rebellion, the French Emperor Napoleon Bonaparte ordered troops into the colony in 1801, but in 1803 the French conceded defeat and the rebel leader Jean-Jacques Dessalines proclaimed Saint-Domingue to be a new republic named Haiti.

The Revolution broke up the large land-ownings and created a society of small subsistence farmers. Haitians largely began living in lakous, or extended family compounds, which enabled the preservation of African-derived Creole religions. These lakous often had their own lwa rasin (root lwa), being intertwined with concepts of land and kinship. Many Roman Catholic missionaries had been killed in the Revolution, and after its victory Dessalines declared himself head of the Church in Haiti. Protesting these actions, the Roman Catholic Church cut ties with Haiti in 1805; this allowed Vodou to predominate in the country. Many churches left abandoned were adopted for Vodou rites, continuing the syncretization between the two systems. At this point, with no new arrivals from Africa, Vodou began to stabilise, transforming from "a widely-scattered series of local cults" into "a religion". The Roman Catholic Church re-established its formal presence in Haiti in 1860.

Haiti's first three presidents sought to suppress Vodou, using police to break-up rituals which they feared as a source of rebellion. In 1847, Faustin Soulouque became president; he was sympathetic to Vodou and allowed it to be practiced more openly.

In the Bizoton Affair of 1863, four men and four women were accused of ritually killing a child before eating it in a Vodou ritual. The affair received extensive attention in popular media. Historical sources suggest the individuals were tortured prior to confessing to the crime, after which they were executed.

== 20th century to the present ==
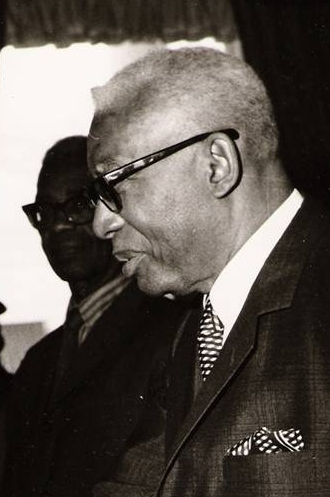
Haitian president François Duvalier called Vodou "the supreme factor of Haitian unity".

The United States occupied Haiti between 1915 and 1934, although it faced armed resistance from Haitian peasants, many of them Vodouists. American occupation encouraged international interest in Vodou, something catered for in the sensationalist writings of Faustin Wirkus, William Seabrook, and John Craige, as well as in Vodou-themed shows for tourists. The period also saw the growing influence of the Roman Catholic Church, and in 1941 the Church backed Operation Nettoyage (Operation Cleanup), a government campaign to expunge Vodou, during which many ounfòs were destroyed. Violent responses from Vodouists led President Élie Lescot to abandon the Operation.

During the occupation, the indigénisme (indigenist) movement developed among Haiti's middle classes, later transmogrifying into the international Négritude movement. These encouraged a more positive assessment of Vodou and peasant culture, a trend supported by the appearance of professional ethnological research on the topic from the 1930s onward. Church influence in Haiti was curtailed by François Duvalier, the country's president from 1957 to 1971. Although he restored Catholicism as the state religion, Duvalier was widely perceived as a champion of Vodou, calling it "the supreme factor of Haitian unity". He utilized it for his own purposes, encouraging rumors about his own supernatural powers, and selecting oungans as his chefs-de-sections (rural section chiefs).

After Duvalier's son and successor, Jean-Claude, was overthrown in 1986, there were attacks on Vodouists perceived to have supported the Duvaliers, partly motivated by Protestant anti-Vodou campaigns; practitioners called this violence the Dechoukaj ('uprooting'). Two groups, the Zantray and Bode Nasyonal, were formed to defend the rights of Vodouists and hold rallies. Haiti's 1987 constitution enshrined freedom of religion, after which President Jean-Bertrand Aristide granted Vodou official recognition in 2003, thus allowing Vodouists to officiate at civil ceremonies such as weddings and funerals.

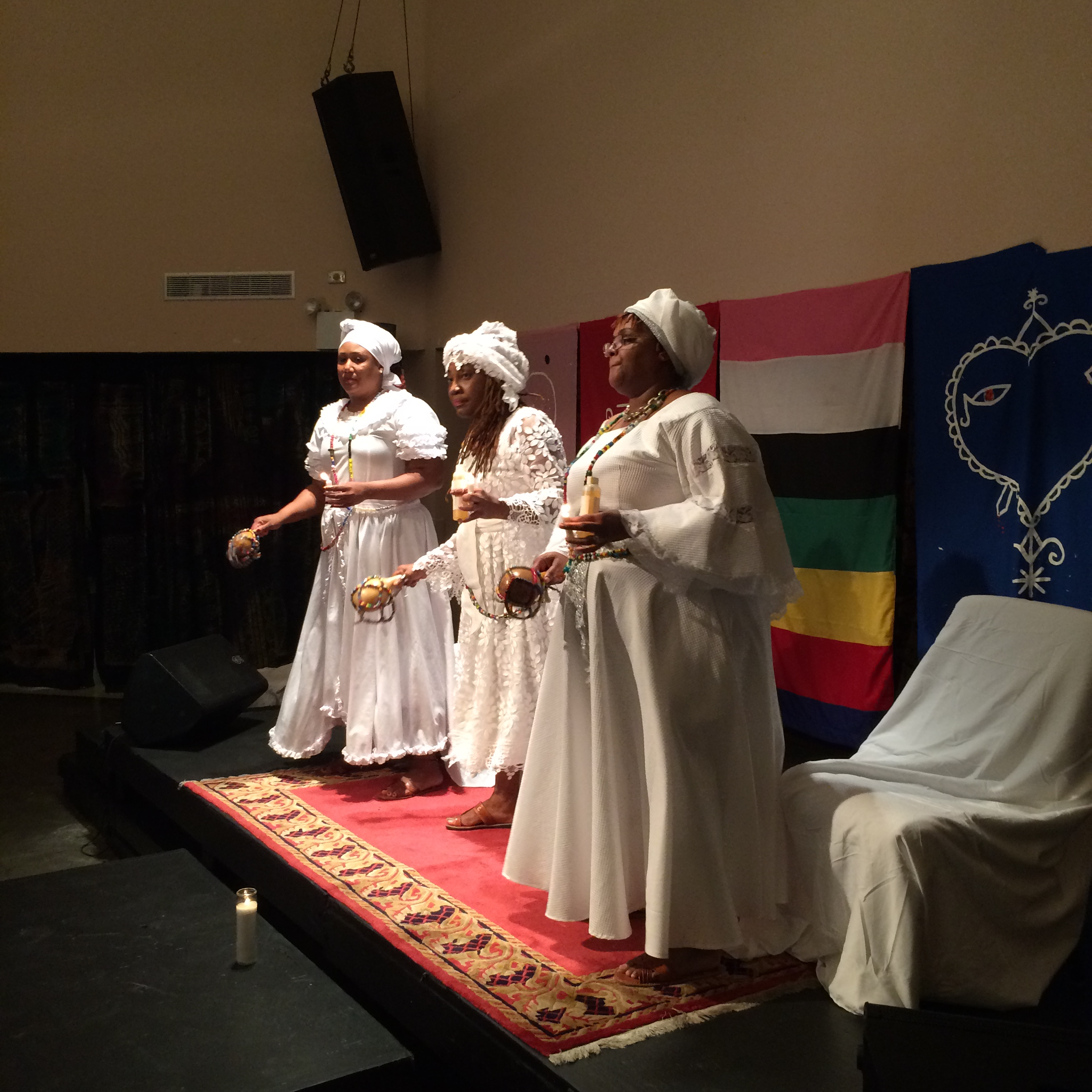
A Vodou ceremony taking place at the National Black Theatre in New York City in 2017

The latter half of the 20th century saw the substantial growth of evangelical Protestantism in Haiti, generating tensions with Vodouists. These Protestants regard Vodou as Satanic, and unlike the Roman Catholic authorities have generally refused to compromise with its practitioners. The 2010 Haiti earthquake fuelled conversion from Vodou to Protestantism, with many Protestants claiming that the earthquake was punishment for the sins of the Haitian population, including their practice of Vodou. Mob attacks on Vodouists followed in the wake of the earthquake, and again following the 2010 cholera outbreak.

The first three decades of the 20th century saw growing Haitian migration to eastern Cuba, introducing Vodou to the island. From 1957, many Haitians emigrated to escape Duvalier, taking Vodou with them. In the U.S., Vodou has attracted non-Haitians, especially African Americans and Caribbean migrants, and has syncretized with other religions like Santería and Spiritism. During the latter half of the 20th century, those seeking to revive New Orleans Voodoo initiated practices that brought the religion closer to Haitian Vodou or Santería than it had been early in that century.
