= Sculpt =

Sculpt may be:

- a verb meaning 'to sculpture'
- the name of a 2016 film
