= Sculpt (film) =

2016 film directed by Loris Gréaud

Sculpt is a 2016 American science fiction film scripted and directed by Loris Gréaud.

== Synopsis ==
Sculpt depicts an international market organized around shapes and experiences. In this world, thought recording is the object of a global market that thrives on a quest for moments of pure intensity, beautiful experience, thought, and obsession.

The movie recounts how this ecosystem, equipped with traders, middlemen, buyers, collectors, and producers is structured, and how this elite group creates experiences. No one suspects what is woven behind those objects as its counterpoint is organized in parallel: a black market of impure experiences, and a violent and dystopian underworld.

The movie follows the thoughts of a man whom viewers know little. He researches the concept of what experiencing beauty, thought, or obsession can be, without regard for the risks that subjects experience. He is convinced that he can enact the rules of this new world.

== Project ==
Sculpt was produced for the Los Angeles County Museum of Art (LACMA). It is Loris Gréaud’s first major exhibition project on the US west coast and his first feature-length film. LACMA CEO Michael Govan, said, “Gréaud is rethinking cinema in form, content, and its relationship to audience.”

For the premiere, LACMA’s Bing Theater was reconfigured for a single audience member at a time. Each screening was turned into a one-person experience, with the movie effectively watching its visitor as it is watched. Screenings took place due to a generous loan from Voodoo Queen Priestess Miriam Chamani, who permitted its distribution solely at LACMA. The film is on loan for an unspecified time.

== Distribution ==
A series of bootlegs and stolen clips from the movie occasionally reappear via the black market, during illegal screenings throughout the world, and as far as the Dark Net.

== Cast ==
- Willem Dafoe
- Charlotte Rampling
- Abel Ferrara
- The Residents
- Michael Lonsdale
- Pascal Greggory
- Claude Parent
- Betty Catroux
- Voodoo Queen Priestess Miriam Chamani
