= New Orleans Historic Voodoo Museum =

New Orleans Voodoo Museum
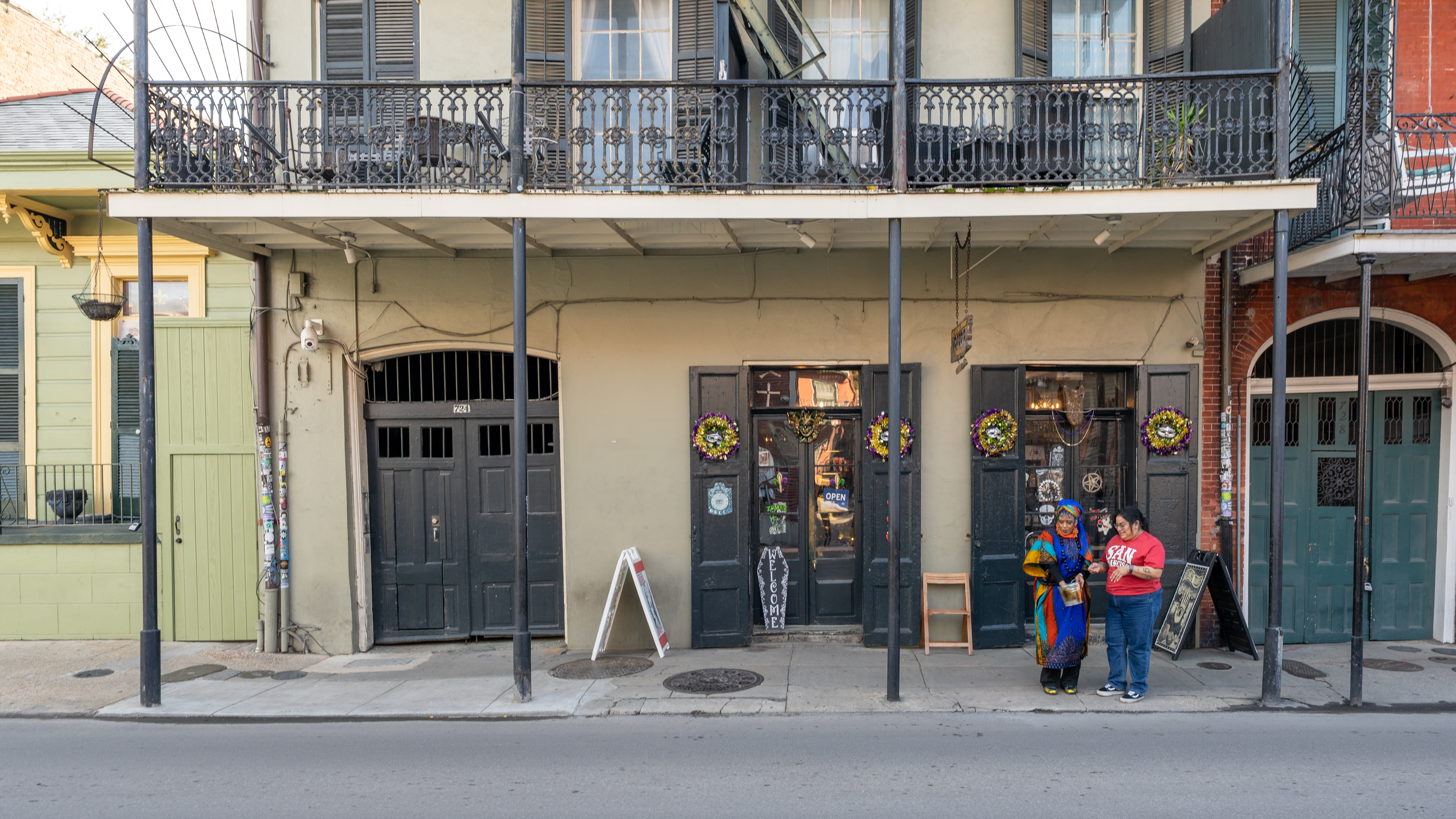
- Established: 1972
- Location: 724 Dumaine St, New Orleans, Louisiana, US
- Coordinates: 29.959880°N 90.063870°W
- Type: Religious museum, art museum, history museum
- Website: voodoomuseum.com

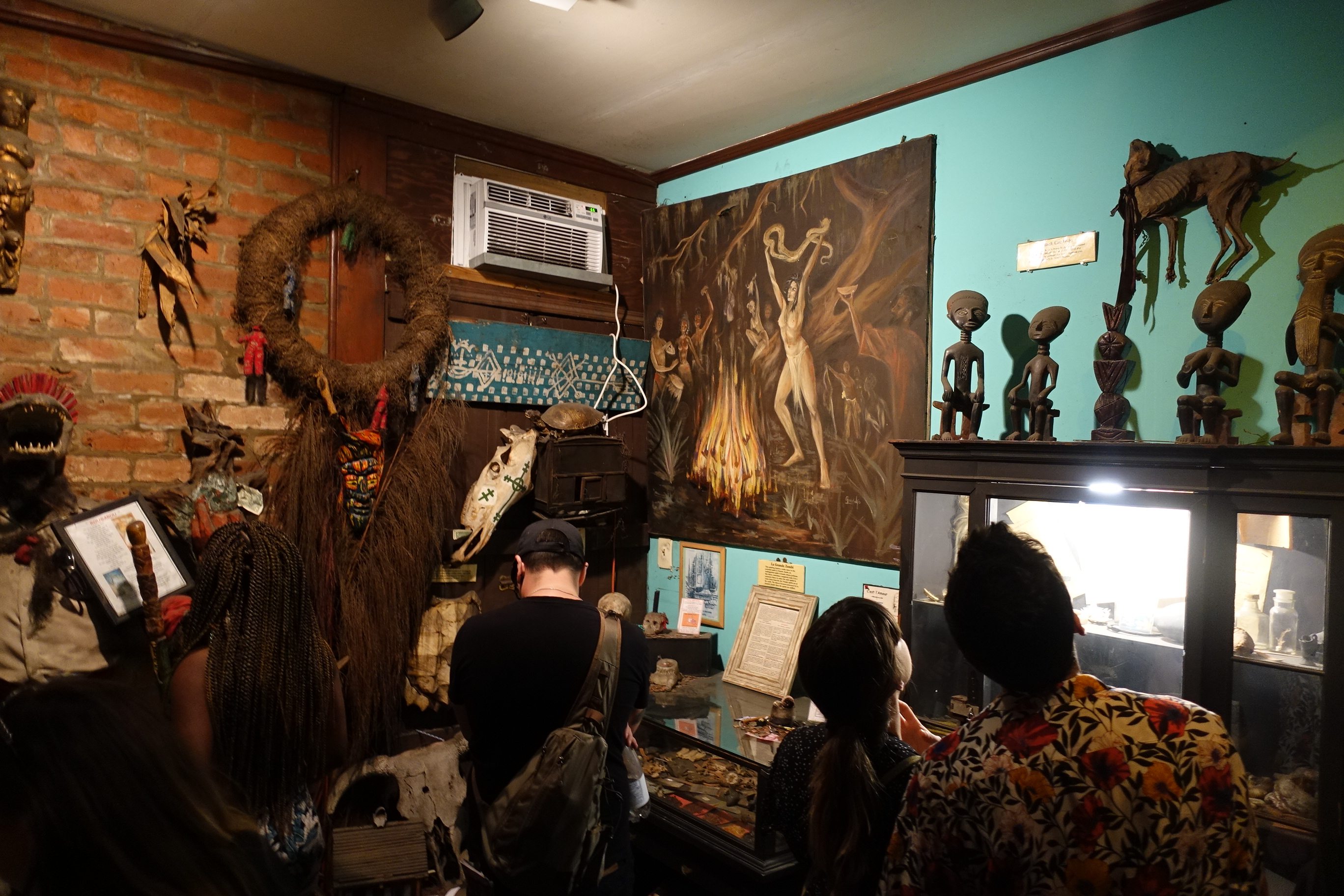
New Orleans Historic Voodoo Museum, interior view

New Orleans Historic Voodoo Museum is a voodoo museum in New Orleans, United States. Its exhibits focus on mysteries, history, and folklore related to the African diaspora religion of Louisiana Voodoo. It is situated between Bourbon and Royal Streets in the centre of the French Quarter. Although only a small museum, consisting of two rooms, it is one of few museums in the world dedicated entirely to Vodou art. There is a voodoo priest on site giving readings. Separately, the museum also hosts walking tours to the Marie Laveau tomb in the Saint Louis Cemetery and the Congo Square.

The New Orleans Historic Voodoo Museum was established in 1972 and quickly became a center where folklore, Voodoo, zombies, history and culture came together in the heart of the French Quarter. The mysterious and eclectic nature of the museum was echoed by its founder, Charles Massicot Gandolfo. Charles, affectionately known as Voodoo Charlie, set about gathering an assortment of artifacts which focus on mysteries, history, and folklore related to the African diaspora religion of Louisiana Voodoo.

Despite its modest size, it remains one of the only museums in the world dedicated entirely to Voodoo art, culture, and religion.

The museum boasts original works of art by celebrated local artists such Herbert “Coon” Singleton, which include altars, wishing stumps, masks, and killer sticks. Original paintings by Voodoo Charlie can also be found throughout the museum, depicting scenes of rituals, Voodoo priestesses, and Louisiana folklore.

Visitors can also experience the elaborate Voodoo flags or banners, created by renowned Haitian artist, Joseph Oldof Pierre. The Voodoo flags are one of the most spectacular Haitian art forms. They are traditionally the work of practicing vodou priests and their followers and are displayed in the vodou sanctuaries as well as ceremonies. The flags are made of shiny silk fabrics to which have been sewn a brilliant mosaic of sequins and beads, and typically contains 18,000 to 20,000 sequins.

Other highlights of the museum include the Main Altar, where visitors may leave offerings and prayers to their deities of choice, and the wooden kneeling board, which according to legend, belonged to Voodoo queen, Marie Laveau herself.

In the Gris Gris Room, visitors will find a recreation of the Rougarou, standing side by side with Baron Samedi- two essential figures in Louisiana Voodoo and folklore.

There you will also find ceremonial masks from Central American, fertility statues from the Ahsanti tribe and “Passport” masks used by tribes to travel regionally.

Despite the museum's 50 plus years of history, it remains an ever-changing and developing hub of Louisiana culture for both tourists and locals alike. There is a voodoo priest on site giving readings and a gift shop full of educational information, souvenirs, and curiosities.

The New Orleans Historic Voodoo Museum is situated between Bourbon and Royal Streets in the heart of the French Quarter.
