= Baruch Glasman =

Yiddish novelist (1893–1945)

Glasman in 1943

Baruch Glasman (Yiddish: ברוך גלאזמאן, Russian: Барух Глазман; 1 December 1893 – 1 June 1945) was a Yiddish novelist, short story writer, and essayist. He was born in the miasteczko of Kapitkevichi, Mozyrsky Uyezd, Minsk Governorate, Russian Empire, in a family of craftsmen. From 1906 he lived in Kyiv, studied at yeshivas, as well as at the gymnasium. In 1911, he emigrated to the USA. He worked in a factory, house painter, attended night school. Glasman's first works were published in Yiddish, performed in 1913. He was published in almost all major American and European newspapers and magazines of his time (including Soviet ones). Glasman received a B.A. from Ohio State University in 1918, after which he served in the U.S. Army (1918–19). From 1924 to 30, he lived in Poland, where he toured, lecturing to audiences on the subject of Yiddish literature in America. Glasman was the first American-Jewish writer to visit the USSR in 1924, spent more than a year here, and upon returning, published a book in which he describes the life of working people in the USSR with great sympathy. In 1930, he returned to New York, where he remained until his death in 1945. He wrote his works in Yiddish and in English. The main theme of his work is the life of Jewish emigrants in America. His work is characterized by the image of a Jew surrounded by various nationalities, as well as a tendency to identify social contradictions in contemporary American Jewry.

== Works ==
=== Works in Yiddish ===
- 1921 באגינען : נאוועלען
- 1923 אויף א האר : נאוועלן
- 1925 שטיינוועבס : נאוועלען
- 1927 אינם ראד
- 1927 אויף דער פעלדער פון דזשארדזשיא
- 1927 אויף אן אינזל : ראמאן
- 1928 פארטונקלט גאלד
- 1928 סטעפ און ישוב: בילדער פון ש רייזע איבער די יידישע קאלאניעס פון סאוועט־רוסלאנד און אוקרינע
- 1928 אויף יענער זייט אקעאן
- 1935 אנטרונענע : פינף דערציילונגען
- 1937 לענדער און לעבנס : די געשיכטע פון א משפחה אין אמעריקע און אין סאוועט-רוסלאנד : ראמאן אין צוויי בענד און פיר טיילן
- 1940 אין גאלדינעם זומפ : נאוועלע אין צוויי טיילן
- 1946 ברויט : ראמאן

=== Stories in English ===
- "Tarnished Gold" 1933
- "Rabbi in Dixie" 1942
- "In the Crucible" 1945
- "Quiet Words"

== Notes ==
- Glasman's books
