= Roman Glazman =

Roman Evsey Glazman
- Glazman, 1986
- Born: Roman Evsey Glazman; 26 June 1948 (age 76); St. Petersburg, Russia
- Died: 24 April 2006 (aged 57); Altadena, California, U.S.
- Citizenship: Subject of Russia during the former Soviet Union (1948–1979); Stateless (1979–1985); Citizen of the United States (1985–2006)
- Education: Russian State Hydrometeorological University (B.S., M.S., 1971); Shirshov Institute of Oceanology (M.S., 1977); GSO, University of Rhode Island (Ph.D., 1985)
- Spouses: Tatyana Zueva (m. 1971; div. 1978) Irena Summ (m. 1979; div. 1993)
- Awards: NASA/JPL 20 years of Service Recognition Award (2006)
- Scientific career
- Fields: Physics, Oceanography
- Institutions: University of Rhode Island (Kingston, RI) (1980–1986); NASA/Jet Propulsion Lab (1986–2006); Caltech (visits, 1986–2005)
- Thesis: A Mathematical Model of Breaking Wave Statistics (1985)
- Academic advisors: Melvin Stern

Roman Evsey Glazman (June 26, 1948 – April 24, 2006) was a Russian American physicist and oceanographer.

== Early life and education ==
Roman E. Glazman was born in St. Petersburg, Russia, on June 26, 1948, in a secular Jewish family. He became a citizen of the United States on October 28, 1985, and completed his PhD in Ocean Engineering at the University of Rhode Island in 1985.

== Career ==
Glazman's scientific research was the study of ocean and atmosphere. He began working at NASA's Jet Propulsion Laboratory in La Cañada Flintridge and Pasadena, California.

Glazman published more than 40 works in oceanography in scientific journals and completed over 60 research studies presenting at International Scientific Conferences, including OCEANS Conference, Geoscience and Remote Sensing International Symposium (IGARSS), Wormley Conference, American Geophysical Union Conference (AGU), International Association for Physical Sciences of the Ocean, International Union of Geodesy and Geophysics.

Glazman conducted exploratory expeditions in the Bering Sea and the North Pacific Ocean off the coast of Kamchatka and Japan, the Arctic, as well as the Barents Sea off the coast of Finland. He took measurements of the depths and salinity of oceans, of the wind forces, pressures and surface temperatures, by experimentation equipped with vessel technology available in the 1970s.

The topics in which Glazman made contributions include wave dynamics, capillary- and inertia-gravity waves, nonlinear waves and turbulence, Rossby waves, sea level measurements, sea surface geometry, magnetic field at sea surface, wind generated wave dynamics, adsorbed film and oscillations.

== Selected publications ==
- Glazman, Roman E.; Greysukh, Alexander (1993). "Satellite altimeter measurements of surface wind". Journal of Geophysical Research. 98 (C2): 2475–2483. Bibcode:1993JGR....98.2475G. doi:10.1029/92JC02659.
- Glazman, Roman. "Long internal waves studies with applications to large-scale ocean transport and improvement of altimeter measurements". NASA Jet Propulsion Laboratory. Archived from the original on 2011-08-13.
- Glazman, Roman E. (1991). "Fractal Nature Of Surface Geometry In A Developed Sea". In Schertzer, D.; Lovejoy, S. (eds.). Non-Linear Variability in Geophysics. Kluwer Academic Publishing. pp. 217–227. ISBN 978-9401074667.
- Glazman, Roman E. (1994). "A Cascade Model Of Wave Turbulence With Applications To Surface Gravity And Capillary Waves". In Vicsek, T.; Shlesinger, M. (eds.). Fractals in Natural Sciences. World Scientific Publishing Company. pp. 219–227. ISBN 978-9810216245. OCLC 31978082.
- Glazman, Roman E. (1992). "Wave Spectra of Developed Seas". In Fitzmaurice, N.; Gurarie D. (eds.). Nonlinear Waves and Weak Turbulence. Springer. pp. 45–68. ISBN 978-0817636678.
- Glazman, Roman E. (1995). "Scale-dependent Ocean Wave Turbulence". In Molchanov, S.A.; Woyczynski, W. A. (eds.). Stochastic Models in Geosystems. Springer. pp. 97–114. ISBN 978-1461385028.
