= Jeff Glassman =

American actor

- Born: Chicago, Illinois
- Occupation: experimental theatre artist

Jeff Glassman is a theatre artist, actor, and composer of movement from Chicago, living in Urbana, Illinois. From 1971 to 1986, he was a founding member of the United Mime Workers experimental theatre collective and toured in the United States, Eastern and Western Europe, Mexico and Cuba. He innovated several different ways of organizing, composing and notating movement and speech for theatre. This includes ways of composing movement and speech separately in time and space involving a three-dimensional grid system. He has taught "Inventing Systems for Theatre and Music" at The Evergreen State College.

Continuously since 1991 he has collaborated extensively with movement-based theatre artist Lisa Fay through originating ideas, techniques and new performance works. They invent ways for disengaging normal relations of speech to gesture, for separating characters into parallel time-place frames of reference, and for bringing the elements back together in novel arrangements. They tour often as the "Lisa Fay and Jeff Glassman Duo" and "Fay|Glassman Performance" in the US and South Korea and conduct performance residencies.
