= New Orleans Voodoo Spiritual Temple =

Religious organization in U.S.

Coordinates: 29°57′59.1″N 90°3′46.5″W

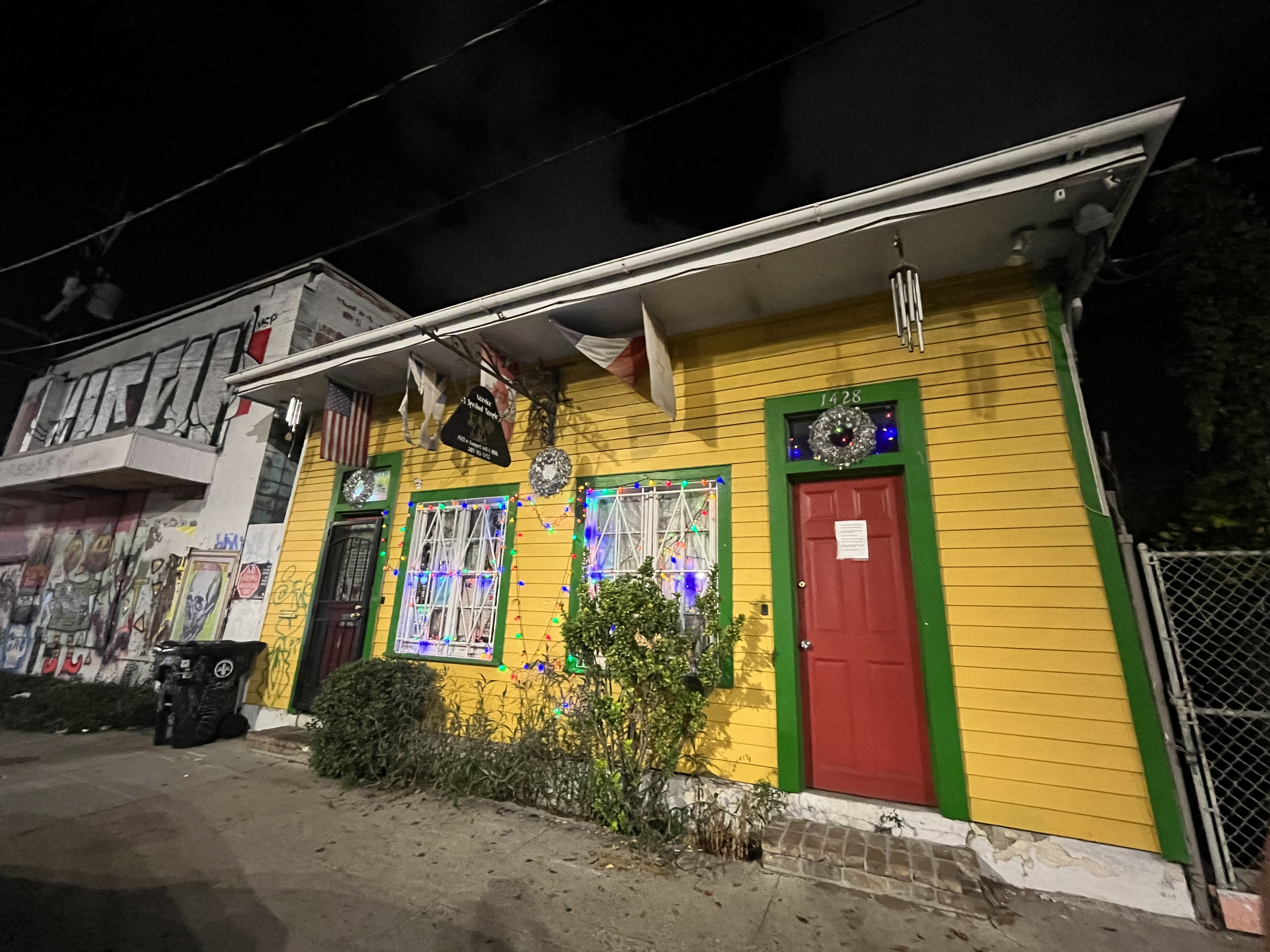
New Orleans Voodoo Spiritual Temple

The New Orleans Voodoo Spiritual Temple was established in New Orleans, Louisiana, in May 1990 by Priest Oswan Chamani and Priestess Miriam Chamani.

== Background ==
Over the years the Temple has grown in its knowledge of Voodoo in relation with World Religions, and serves many people throughout America and the World. The Temple follows a unique version of Voodoo that combines elements of other spiritual paths with traditional practices. It has become known through television and movie production, and is visited by representatives of universities, anthropologists, and researchers in African-based religion. The Temple has a troupe of sacred drummers called the Krewe of Nutria led, in part, by Louis Martinie', who have played for the New Orleans Voodoo Museum, and at various local functions. It is located at 1428 North Rampart Street down the road from Historic Congo Square Park where African slaves held their rituals every Sunday evening in the Seventeen through Eighteen Hundreds.
