= Louisiana Voodoo =

African diasporic religion in Louisiana

Louisiana Voodoo, (Note: French: Vaudou louisianais, Spanish: Vudú de Luisiana, Louisiana Creole: Voudou Lalwizyàn) also known as New Orleans Voodoo, was an African diasporic religion that existed in Louisiana and the broader Mississippi River valley between the 18th and early 20th centuries. It arose through a process of syncretism between the traditional religions of West and Central Africa, Haitian Vodou and Catholicism. No central authority controlled Louisiana Voodoo, which was organized through autonomous groups.

From the early 18th century, enslaved West and Central Africans—the majority of them Bambara and Bakongo—were brought to the French colony of Louisiana. There, their traditional religions syncretized with each other and with the Catholic beliefs of the French. This continued as Louisiana came under Spanish control and was then purchased by the United States in 1803. In the early 19th century, many migrants fleeing the Haitian Revolution arrived in Louisiana, bringing with them Haitian Vodou, which contributed to the formation of Louisiana Voodoo. Practiced primarily by black people, but with some white involvement, Voodoo spread up the Mississippi River to Missouri. Although the religion was never banned, its practice was restricted through laws regulating when and where black people could gather. Growing government opposition in the mid-19th century brought multiple arrests and prosecutions, while increased press attention directed greater attention to prominent Voodoo practitioners like Marie Laveau. Voodoo died out in the early 20th century, although some of its practices survived through hoodoo.

Information about Voodoo's beliefs and practices comes from various historical records, but this material is partial and much about the religion is not known. Historical records reveal the names of various deities who were worshiped in Voodoo. Prominent among them were Blanc Dani, the Grand Zombi, and Papa Lébat, whose identities derived from various African divinities. These were venerated at altars and offered animal sacrifices; several sources refer to the involvement of live snakes in rituals. Spirits of the dead and Catholic saints also played a prominent role. Each Voodoo group was independent and typically led by a priestess or less commonly a priest. Membership of these groups was provided through an initiation ceremony. Major celebrations occurred at Saint John's Eve (23 or 24 June), which in the 19th century was marked by large gatherings on the shores of Lake Pontchartrain. Also playing an important part of Voodoo practice was the production of material charms, often known as gris-gris, for purposes such as healing and cursing.

Louisiana Voodoo has long faced opposition from non-practitioners, who have characterized it as witchcraft and devil-worship, negative attitudes that have resulted in many sensationalist portrayals of the religion in popular culture. From the 1960s, the New Orleans tourist industry increasingly used references to Voodoo to attract visitors, while the 1990s saw the start of a Voodoo revival, the practitioners of which drew heavily on other African diasporic religions such as Haitian Vodou and Cuban Santería.

== Definitions ==
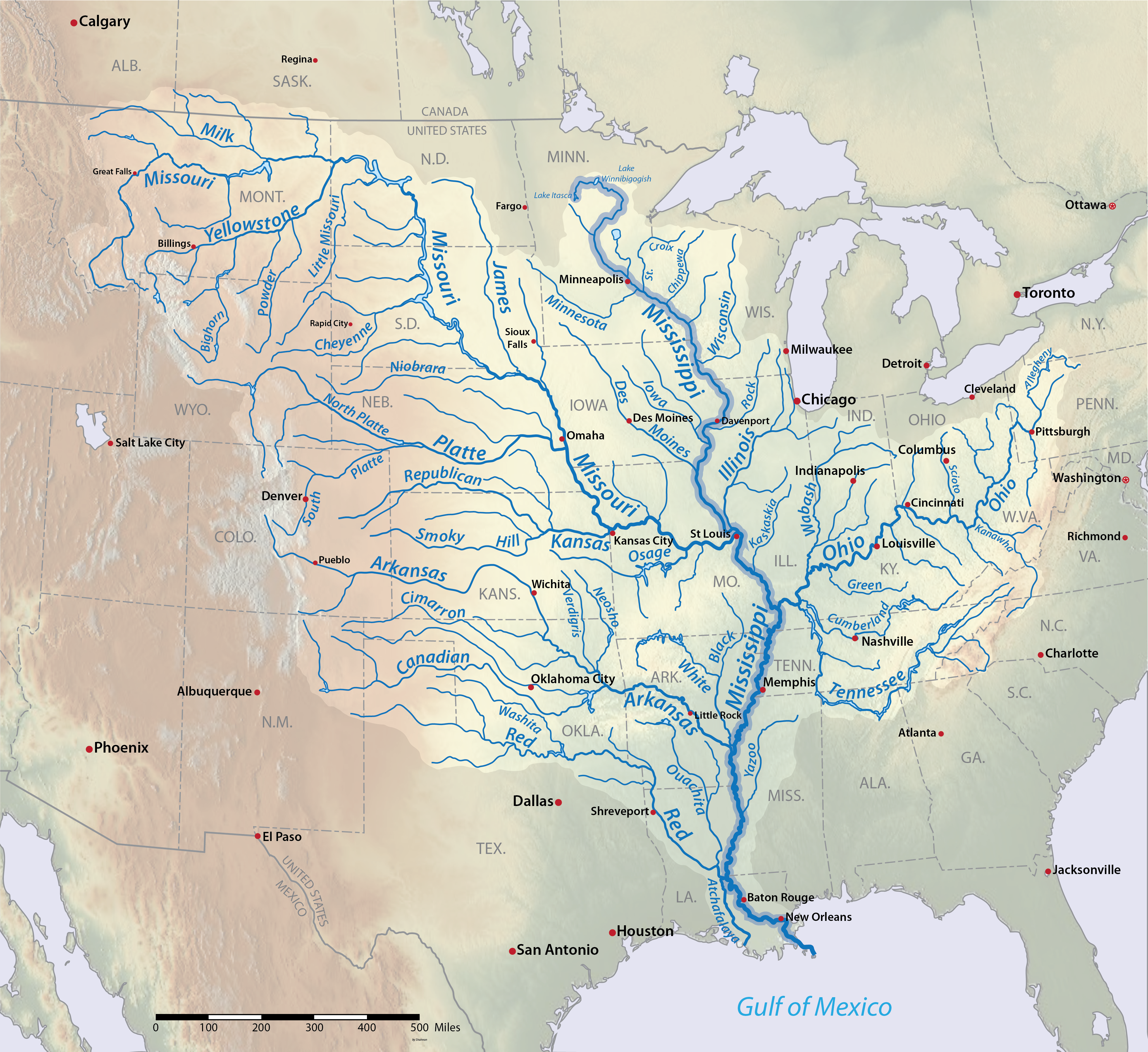
The Mississippi River Valley, along which Louisiana Voodoo was found

Louisiana Voodoo was a religion, and more specifically an "African diasporic religion", a native African American religion, and a creole religion. Louisiana Voodoo has also been referred to as New Orleans Voodoo, and—in some older texts—Voodooism. The scholar Ina J. Fandrich described it as the "Afro-Creole counterculture religion of southern Louisiana".

Louisiana Voodoo emerged along the Mississippi River valley, and especially in the city of New Orleans, during the 18th and early 19th centuries before dying out in the early 20th century. It was informed heavily by the traditional African religions brought to the region, predominantly from West Central Africa and Senegambia, but also took influence from the Native Americans of the Mississippi River Valley, French and Spanish settlers, Anglo-Americans, and Haitian migrants bringing with them Haitian Vodou.

The historical record for Voodoo is fragmentary, with much information about the religion being lost and not recoverable. It was a largely oral tradition, with its followers often being illiterate or uninterested in committing information about their practices to writing. It had no formal creed, nor a specific sacred text, and had no unifying organized structure or hierarchy. Practitioners often adapted Voodoo to suit their specific requirements, in doing so often mixing it with other religious traditions. Throughout its history, many Voodoo practitioners also practiced Catholicism and integrated Catholic elements into their practice of Voodoo. In turn, the Catholic Church largely ignored Voodoo throughout much of the 18th and early 19th centuries. The prominent 19th-century Voodoo priestess Marie Laveau for instance regularly attended Mass at a Catholic church, and was close friends with the Catholic Friar Antonio de Sedella, who worked with her in ministering to the sick.

=== Etymology and terminology ===
The term Voodoo derives ultimately from vodu, a term meaning "spirit" or "deity" among the Fon and Ewe languages of West Africa. Although the spelling Voodoo is now the most popular way of referring to the Louisiana religion, variant spellings have been used over the years, including Voudou and Vaudou. In modern scholarship, the spelling Voodoo is sometimes used for the Louisiana practice to distinguish it from Haitian Vodou. When the religion was active, its practitioners often referred to themselves as Voodoos, although elsewhere they have been called Voodooists.

A related term is hoodoo, which may originally have been largely synonymous with Voodoo. The historian Jeffrey Anderson noted that the distinction between the two terms is "blurry" and "depends[s] heavily on who explains them". Some Voodoo practitioners evidently called what they did hoodoo; in 1940, one practitioner was recorded as saying that "Voodoo means the worker, hoodoo the things they do". The historian Katrina Hazzard-Donald noted that in parts of Louisiana, hoodoo and Voodoo would have been "viewed as indistinguishable in many respects by outsiders and believers alike." Attempting to clarify things, by the 21st century there was a general scholarly consensus that the terms Voodoo and hoodoo should be used to describe two distinct phenomena. Thus, the term hoodoo has come to describe "the brand of African American supernaturalism found along the Mississippi", meaning the use of charms and spells, often to heal or to harm, that need not make any reference to deities. In this, hoodoo differs from the specific religion, with its priesthood and organised deity worship, that is characterized by the term Voodoo.

== Beliefs ==
=== Deities ===
Although it displayed its own spiritual hierarchy, Louisiana Voodoo had no formal theology. Many practitioners of Voodoo did not see their religion as being in intrinsic conflict with the Catholicism that was dominant along the Mississippi River, and thus practiced both religions. Despite this, there was no clear evidence of the Christian God being incorporated into the Voodoo pantheon. Anderson suggested that Voodooists may have seen the worship of God as something that was best done in a Christian church.

Tout, tout, pays blanc — Danié qui commandé
Danié qui commandé ça!
Danié qui commandé

— A song used among Louisiana field hands, recorded in 1885, that probably related to Blanc Dani

The names of Louisiana Voodoo's deities were recorded in various 19th-century sources. These deities seem to derive predominantly from spirits venerated around the Bight of Benin. In contrast to Haitian Vodou, there is no evidence that these were divided into groups known as nanchon (nations). One of the most important deities was Blanc Dani, also known as Daniel Blanc or Monsieur Danny. The earliest records of him date from 1880, and it is probable that he derives from Dan or Da, a deity venerated by the Fon and Ewe people and whose worship centred largely around Ouidah (in modern Benin). In West Africa, Dan is associated with the color white and this may explain suggestions from the Louisiana material that Blanc Dani was perceived as a white man.

Although there are no specific references to Blanc Dani being a serpent, the prominence of snakes within Louisiana Voodoo might have been an allusion to Blanc Dani, for Dan is often associated with snakes in both West Africa and in his Haitian form, Damballa. Another recorded name, Dambarra Soutons, may be an additional name for Blanc Dani. A similar figure, Grandfather Rattlesnake, appeared in the 19th-century folklore of African-American Missourians and may also be a development of the same West African character.

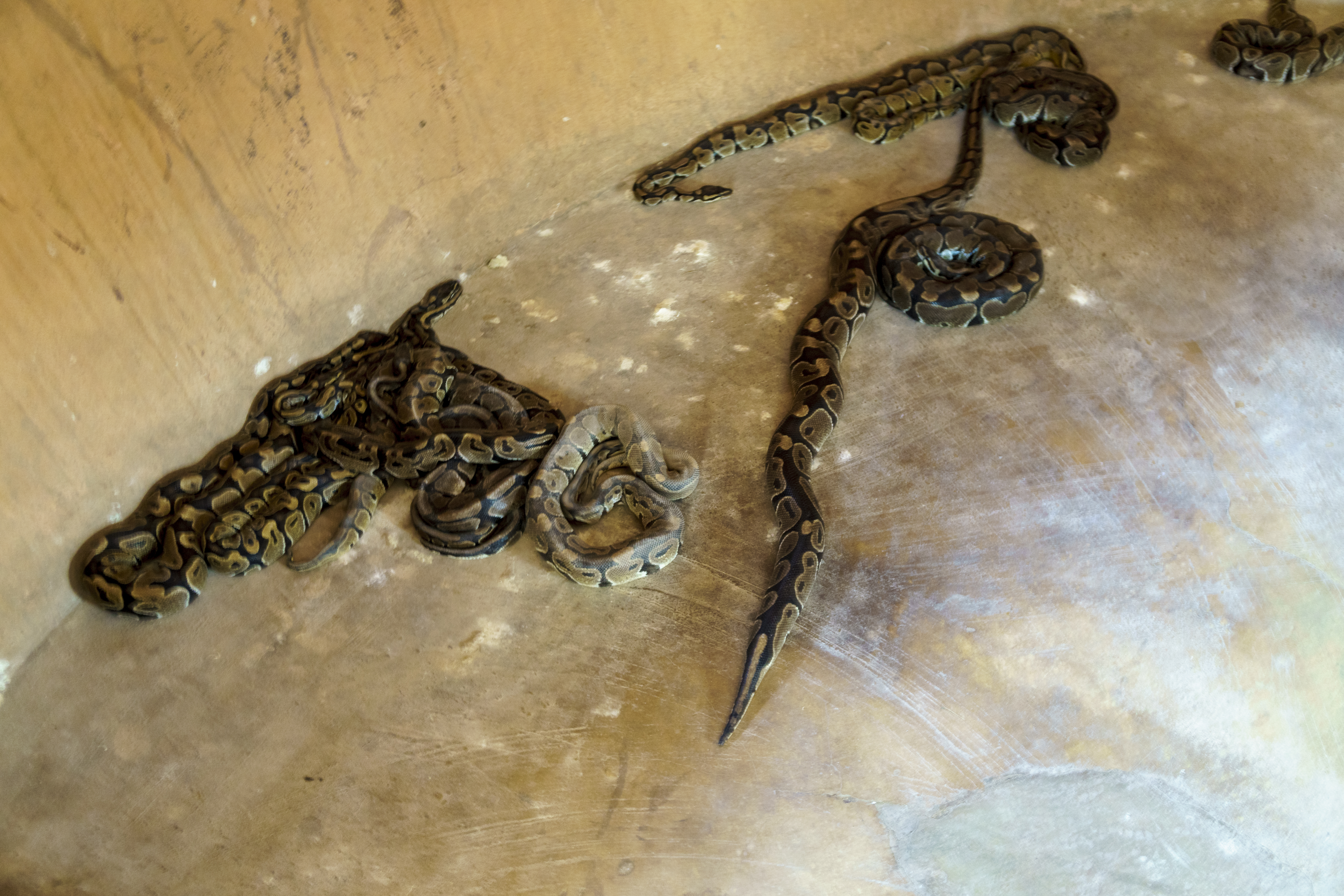
The use of live snakes in Louisiana Voodoo may relate to the West African association between snakes and the deity Dan; the latter is evident at the Temple of the Pythons in Ouidah (pictured)

It is also possible that Blanc Dani was ultimately equated with another deity, known as the Grand Zombi, whose name meant "Great God", „Great Soul“ or "Great Spirit;" the term Zombi derives from the Kongo Bantu term nzambi (god). Another prominent deity was Papa Lébat, also called Liba, LaBas, or Laba Limba, and he was seen as a trickster as well as a doorkeeper; his name stems from the Yoruba deity Legba, with Fandrich suggesting that he was the only one of these New Orleans deities with an unequivocally Yoruba origin.

Monsieur Assonquer, also known as Onzancaire and On Sa Tier, was associated with good fortune in Louisiana Voodoo. His name may suggest an origin in the Yoruba figure Osanyin. Another Louisiana character, Monsieur Agoussou or Vert Agoussou, was associated with love. Vériquité was a spirit associated with the causing of illness, while Monsieur d'Embarass was linked to death. Charlo was a child deity. The names of several other deities are recorded, but with little known about their associations, including Jean Macouloumba, who was also known as Colomba; Maman You; and Yon Sue. There was also a deity called Samunga, called upon by practitioners in Missouri when they were collecting mud.

==== Ancestors and saints ====
The spirits of the dead played a prominent role in Louisiana Voodoo during the 19th century. The prominence of these spirits of the dead may owe something to the fact that New Orleans' African American population was heavily descended from enslaved Bakongo people, whose traditional religion placed strong emphasis on such entities. The importance of the dead is also suggested by the significance that was accorded to graveyard soil by Voodoo practitioners, something that also bears parallels in the religions of West Central Africa. In Louisiana, the term zombi—probably derived from the Kikongo term nzambi—was historically often used to describe a ghost or spirit, or sometimes also a wizard or ritual specialist.

As Africans arrived in Louisiana, they adopted Catholicism and so various West African deities became associated with specific Catholic saints. Papa Lébat was for instance linked to Saint Peter, and Mama You to the Virgin Mary. These linkages were largely forged by similarities between the corresponding figures; Papa Lébat was, for instance, seen to open the way for practitioners, while Saint Peter is traditionally portrayed holding keys. Interviews with elderly New Orleanians conducted in the 1930s and 1940s suggested that, as it existed in the closing three decades of the 19th century, Voodoo primarily entailed supplications to the saints for assistance. Among the most popular was Saint Anthony of Padua; this figure is also the patron saint of the Bakongo, a likely link to the heavily Bakongo-descended population of New Orleans. These correspondences between Catholic saints and African-derived deities are similarly evident in many other African diasporic religions.

=== Morality, ethics, and gender roles ===
Louisiana Voodoo was dominated by women, with the prominent role held by its priestesses leading various commentators to label it matriarchal. The feminist theorist Tara Green defined the term "Voodoo Feminism" to describe instances whereby African American women drew upon both Louisiana Voodoo and conjure to resist racial and gender oppression that they experienced.

Fandrich suggested that Voodoo offered women the opportunity to venerate female deities and witness role models for female leadership that were not offered by other religions in Louisiana at the time. Michelle Gordon believed that the fact that free women of color dominated Voodoo in the 19th century represented a direct threat to the perceived ideological foundations of "white supremacy and patriarchy."

== Practices ==
Present knowledge of Voodoo ceremonies is limited. There are no surviving systematic or detailed accounts of small-scale rituals, and the better recorded accounts of Voodoo ceremonies are restricted primarily to New Orleans rather than other areas of the Mississippi River Valley. From these accounts, it is apparent that rituals often took place in private homes, sometimes in a room set aside for ceremonial purposes. In other cases, they occurred outdoors, as in Congo Square or Saint John's Bayou.

=== Initiation and leadership ===
Voodoo was an initiatory religion and various accounts of initiation ceremonies survive, with the emphasis on initiation showing strong similarities with practices from Sub-Saharan Africa. Fees would often be charged for initiation, something that is common among African traditional religions and African diasporic traditions. Given that various extant African diasporic religions feature multiple degrees or progressive initiations through which a person can pass, Anderson suggested that a similar process might have been evident in Louisiana Voodoo. One Voodoo specialist, King Alexander, for instance reported that there were four degrees in the religion.

For Voodoo's leaders, the tradition provided both a religion and a career. There are various references to these leaders charging people to attend their rituals. Some Voodoo leaders were able to achieve significant economic success through their activities; Marie Laveaux for instance was wealthy enough to become a slave-owner. Leaders seemed to have worn distinctive clothing during ritual.

=== Altars and offerings ===
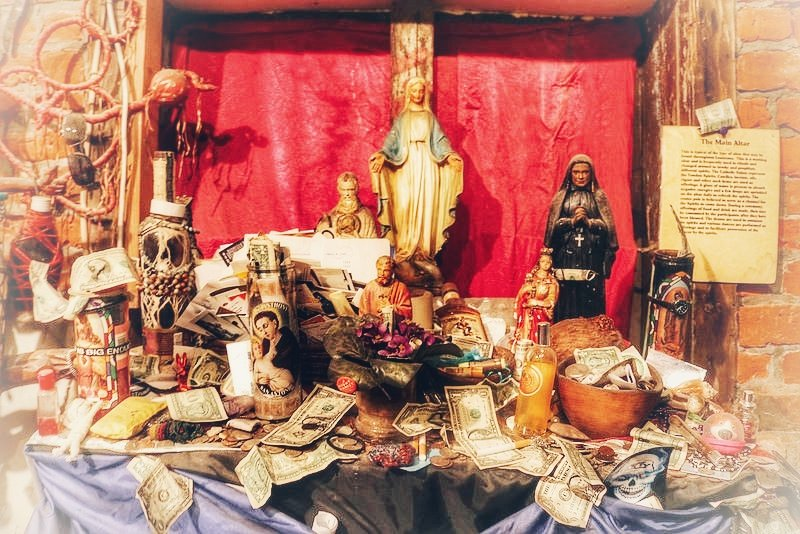
A modern recreation of a Voodoo altar, on display for tourists in Dumaine Street in New Orleans' French Quarter

When practitioners had a room set aside for their ceremonies, it sometimes contained an altar which would include bowls of stones and prints of Roman Catholic saints. Historical records describe the altars created by famous 19th-century Voodoo priestess Marie Laveau in her home; Long noted that these descriptions resemble those of altars used in Haitian Vodou. On being arrested, reports were also made describing the altar of the 19th-century Voodoo priestess Betsey Toledo, indicating that it was decorated with pictures of Catholic saints and apostles.

Sacrifice was a recurring element of Louisiana Voodoo as it was historically practiced, as it continues to be in Haitian Vodou. Although there is little proof that human sacrifice took place in Louisiana Voodoo, persistent rumors claimed that white children were being abducted and killed during some of its rites.

Plates of food may be left out, encircled in a ring of coins. Candles also featured in Louisiana Voodoo rituals, potentially through the influence of Catholicism and Haitian Vodou. Their prominent use in Voodoo contrasted with the apparent absence of candles in "the old black belt Hoodoo tradition" elsewhere in North America.

Laveau used to hold weekly services, which were called parterres.

Many historical Voodoo rituals involved the presence of a snake; Marie Laveau was for instance described as communing with a snake during her ceremonies. Fandrich described the use of a living snake, probably representing the Gran Zombi, as "the trademark of New Orleanian Voodoo".

=== Gris-Gris and healing ===
Charles Gandolfo's painting, Gris-Gris, an imagined portrayal of Voodoo ritual objects for his New Orleans Historic Voodoo Museum

Charms, created to either harm or help, were called gris-gris. This term derives from West Africa, where related words are widespread among many ethnic and linguistic groups, for instance with the Mande word gerregerys. In North America, the term gris-gris was restricted to the lower Mississippi River Valley and a strip along the Gulf of Mexico near the river's mouth. In the Mississippi River Valley, references to gris-gris first date from the 1750s. Another term, Zinzin, sometimes referring to positive charms, derives from the Bamana language. Another term, Wanga, was more commonly used for harmful charms in Voodoo and probably derives from West Central Africa, where the terms oganga and nganga were used for priests in Kikongo.

Some gris-gris comprised animal body parts; a gris-gris created in 1773, and which was reportedly intended to kill someone, was made from the gall and heart of an alligator. A common charm for protection or luck would consist of material wrapped up in red flannel and worn around the neck. Brick dust was also a distinctive feature in the ritual practices of the lower Mississippi River Valley. There are early 20th-century accounts of brick dust being used for washing floors of a business to increase custom, or to scrub a doorstep to protect the household from curses. The brick dust used was red, a color which in much of Africa is associated with the spirit world.

Touchstone believed that gris-gris that caused actual harm did so either through the power of suggestion or by the fact that they contained poisons to which the victim was exposed. One example of a Voodoo curse was to place an object inside the pillow of the victim. Another involves placing a coffin (sometimes a small model; sometimes much larger) inscribed with the victim's name on their doorstep. In other instances, Voodoo practitioners sought to hex others by placing black crosses, salt, or mixtures incorporating mustard, lizards, bones, oil, and grave dust on a victim's doorstep. To counter these hexes, some people cleaned their doorstep or sprinkled it with powdered brick.

Despite its name, the idea of the Voodoo doll has little to do with either Louisiana Voodoo or Haitian Vodou; it derives from the European tradition of poppets. It is possible that the act of inserting pins into a human-shaped doll to cause harm was erroneously linked to African-derived traditions due to a misunderstanding of the nkisi nkondi of Bakongo religion.

=== Communal festivals ===
Communal festivals were also part of Mississippi River Voodoo, with two dates appearing to have been important: All Saints Day (1 November) and Saint John's Eve (23 or 24 June). Of these, we know less about how Voodoo practitioners marked All Saints Day. By the late 19th century, large celebrations marking Saint John's Eve were being held on the shores of Lake Pontchartrain, having become a festival marked by feasting and associated with water. The purpose of the Saint John's Eve ritual is unclear, but to some extent it may have been a celebration of spring. Its focus on the lake as a location may be related to rituals focusing around water than can be found in both West Africa and Haiti.

== History ==
=== French and Spanish Louisiana ===
Much mystery surrounds the origins of Louisiana Voodoo, with its history often being embellished with legend. French settlers arrived in Louisiana in the 1660s, and in 1682 France claimed all lands drained by the Mississippi River and its tributaries. In 1719, the first enslaved Africans were brought to the colony, a group of around 450 people from the port at Ouidah. The religions of the West African slaves combined with elements of the folk Catholicism practiced by the dominant French and Spanish colonists to provide the origins of Louisiana Voodoo. Records of African traditional religious practices being practiced in Louisiana go back to the 1730s, when Antoine-Simon Le Page du Pratz wrote about the use of gris-gris. In 1763 the Spanish Empire took control and remained in power until 1803. Under Spanish rule, Louisiana's economy grew and increasing numbers of enslaved Africans were imported to work on the plantations. The Spanish period also saw the emergence of a class of free people of color, from whom much of Voodoo's leadership would derive.

No one African ethnic group contributed the bulk of beliefs for what became Voodoo. Many of the earliest slaves came from the Bight of Benin and were often Ewe, Fon, and Yoruba, whose traditional religions would prove important influences over Louisiana Voodoo. By the second half of the 1720s Africans imported from Ouidah were being outnumbered by those from Senegambia; these included members of the Bambara, Mandinka, Wolof, and Fula peoples, who practiced a mix of traditional religions and Islam. After the Spanish took control, increasing numbers of slaves were imported from West-Central Africa, many being Bakongo. The Bakongo traditional religion had already absorbed Christian elements, having been exposed to Catholicism from the late 15th century. Bakongo people became the dominant ethnicity in Louisiana, resulting in what Fandrich called a "Kongolization of New Orleans's African American community".

In the Mississippi River Valley, Native American groups like the Natchez, Caddo, and Choctaw remained present throughout the colonial period and into the 19th century, where they operated as trading partners of the Europeans. Close contact between Africans and Native Americans may have helped to preserve African traditional beliefs due to a shared view of the world as being populated by spirits. Certain indigenous plants that were used by the Natives, like sassafras and devil's shoestring, were incorporated into Louisiana's African-derived herbal lore.

Under the French and Spanish colonial governments, Voodoo did not experience strong persecution; there are no records of the Catholic Church waging "anti-superstition campaigns" against the religion in Louisiana. Voodoo was largely tolerated by the authorities throughout the 18th century and there was only one recorded case of Voodoo practitioners being prosecuted during the colonial period. This was the Gris-Gris Case of 1773, in which a group of enslaved men was arrested, accused of making poisonous gris-gris and plotting to kill their master and plantation owner. In this case, it seems that it was the act of rebellion against the slave-owners, rather than the practice of Voodoo, that principally concerned the authorities.

=== 19th Century ===
In 1803, the United States took control of Louisiana through the Louisiana Purchase. This resulted in a large influx of Anglo-Americans into the region. These Anglo-Americans often had some familiarity with African-derived traditions, such as the John Canoe festivities on the Atlantic coast and the Pinkster celebrations in New York, but were unaccustomed to a fully developed African-derived religion with its own deities and priests. They thus often regarded Voodoo as an exotic and primitive superstition. The Anglo-American influx also brought new influences to Voodoo as well as increased attention, including a surge in 19th and early 20th-century newspaper coverage.

The start of the 19th century also saw the Haitian Revolution, whereby African-descended populations in the French Caribbean colony of Saint-Domingue overthrew the French colonial government and established an independent republic, Haiti. As a result of the upheaval, between 15,000 and 20,000 Francophone migrants from Saint-Domingue arrived in the Mississippi River Valley, including those of African, European, and mixed descent. Many would have been familiar with, or actively involved in, Haitian Vodou and their arrival in continental North America likely reinforced and influenced Louisiana Voodoo. Further influences on the Louisiana religion likely came from Spiritualism, which had emerged in northeastern parts of the U.S. during the 1840s; the Spiritualist term "séance" would come to be applied to various Voodoo ceremonies.

According to legend, the first meeting place of the Voodoo practitioners in New Orleans was at an abandoned brickyard in Dumaine Street. Those meetings here faced police disruption and so future meetings took place largely in Bayou St. John and along the shores of Lake Pontchartrain. The religion probably appealed to members of the African diaspora, whether enslaved or free, who lacked recourse to retribution for the poor treatment they received through other means. Voodoo probably spread out from Louisiana and into African American communities throughout the Mississippi River Valley, as there are 19th-century references to Voodoo rituals in both St. Louis and St. Joseph in Missouri; the latter the most northernmost known outpost of the religion. Fandrich suggested that the 1820s and 1830s might have represented the "heyday" of Voodoo, during New Orleans' economic boom.

==== Growing persecution ====
Betsey Toledano, a stout and intelligent free colored woman, appeared as high priestess and chief spokeswoman on the occasion. She contended with no lack of words or weakness of argument, that she had a perfect right to hold the meetings of the Voudou society in her house, if she thought to do so—that the society was a religious African institution, which had been transmitted to her, through her grandmother, from the ancient Congo Queens—that the performances and incantations, though mysterious, were not immoral—and that, for herself, she gloried in being a priestess to an order so venerable and advantageous as was the order of Voudous.

— Daily True Delta coverage of the Betsey Toledano court case, 1850.

Voodoo was never explicitly banned in Louisiana. However, amid establishment fears that Voodoo may be used to foment a slave rebellion, in 1817 the Municipal issued an ordinance preventing slaves from dancing on days other than on Sundays and in locations other than those specifically designated for that purpose. The main location permitted was New Orleans' Congo Square. In the early part of the 19th century, newspapers articles began denouncing the religion. Growing hostility from municipal authorities resulted in various arrests of Voodoo practitioners in the 1850s and 1860s, all of whom were women. These arrests also resulted in much press coverage of the tradition.

In April 1850, eight women were arrested and fined for taking part at a Voodoo ceremony in Dauphine Street. In June, 17 women — including the high priestess Betsey Toledano —were arrested for engaging in a Voodoo dance ceremony in Saint Bernard Street, ostensibly because enslaved people, free blacks, and whites were all present together, in contravention of the law. The following month, Toledano and her group were again arrested after a police raid on her Conti Street home. That same month, a group of women were arrested for performing a ceremony near the lake; they subsequently sought to sue the police, claiming disruption of their legal right to religious assembly. By representing themselves in court, these women revealed they were aware of their legal right to free exercise of religion under the First Amendment to the United States Constitution.

During the American Civil War, the Union Army occupied New Orleans and sought to suppress Voodoo. In one instance, the Union authorities broke up a ceremony of free blacks who they arbitrarily accused of trying to use Voodoo powers to aid the Confederacy. In 1863, women were arrested at a Voodoo dance ceremony in Marais Street; a crowd of over 400 women turned up outside the courtroom, and the charges were subsequently dropped. Repression of Voodoo intensified following the Civil War; the 1870s onward saw white writers display an increased concern that Voodoo rituals were facilitating the interaction between black men and white women. That decade saw large gatherings at Lake Pontchartrain on St John's Eve, including many onlookers and reporters; these declined after 1876. In the 1880s and 1890s, the New Orleans authorities again clamped down on Voodoo. Voodoo was used as evidence to bolster the white elite's claim that Africans were inferior to Europeans and thus bolster their belief in the necessity of legalized segregation.

Various practitioners set up shops selling paraphernalia and charms. They also began exploiting the commercial opportunities of the religion by staging ceremonies that charged entry.

==== Prominent figures ====
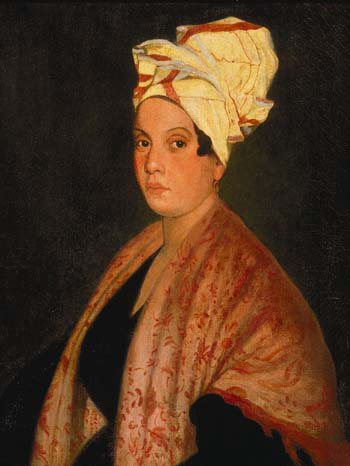
Frank Schneider's painting Portrait of a Creole Woman with Madras Tignon, circa 1915, after an earlier work by George Catlin. This has been interpreted as a possible portrayal of Voodoo priestess Marie Laveau

Free women of color dominated the leadership of Voodoo in New Orleans during the 19th century. Among the fifteen "voodoo queens" in neighborhoods scattered around 19th-century New Orleans, Marie Laveau was known as "the Voodoo Queen", the most eminent and powerful of them all. Her religious rite on the shore of Lake Pontchartrain on St. John's Eve in 1874 attracted some 12,000 black and white New Orleanians. Although her help seemed non-discriminatory, she may have favored enslaved servants: Her most "influential, affluent customers...runaway slaves...credited their successful escapes to Laveau's powerful charms". Both her mother and grandmother had practiced Voodoo; she was also baptized a Catholic and attended mass throughout her life.

Laveau worked as a hairdresser, but also assisted others with the preparation of herbal remedies and charms. She died in 1881. Her influence continues in the city. In the 21st century, her gravesite in the oldest cemetery is a major tourist attraction; believers of Voodoo offer gifts here and pray to her spirit. Across the street from the cemetery where Laveau is buried, offerings of pound cake are left to the statue of Saint Expedite; these offerings are believed to expedite the favors asked of the Voodoo queen. Saint Expedite represents the spirit standing between life and death. The chapel where the statue stands were once used only for holding funerals. Marie Laveau continues to be a central figure of Louisiana Voodoo and of New Orleans culture. Gamblers shout her name when throwing dice, and multiple tales of sightings of the Voodoo Queen have been told.

Another of the most prominent practitioners of the mid-19th century was Jean Montanée or "Dr John", a free black man who sold cures and other material to various clients, amassing sufficient funds to purchase several slaves. He alleged that he was a prince from Senegal who had been taken to Cuba and there freed before coming to Louisiana.

=== Decline and extinction ===
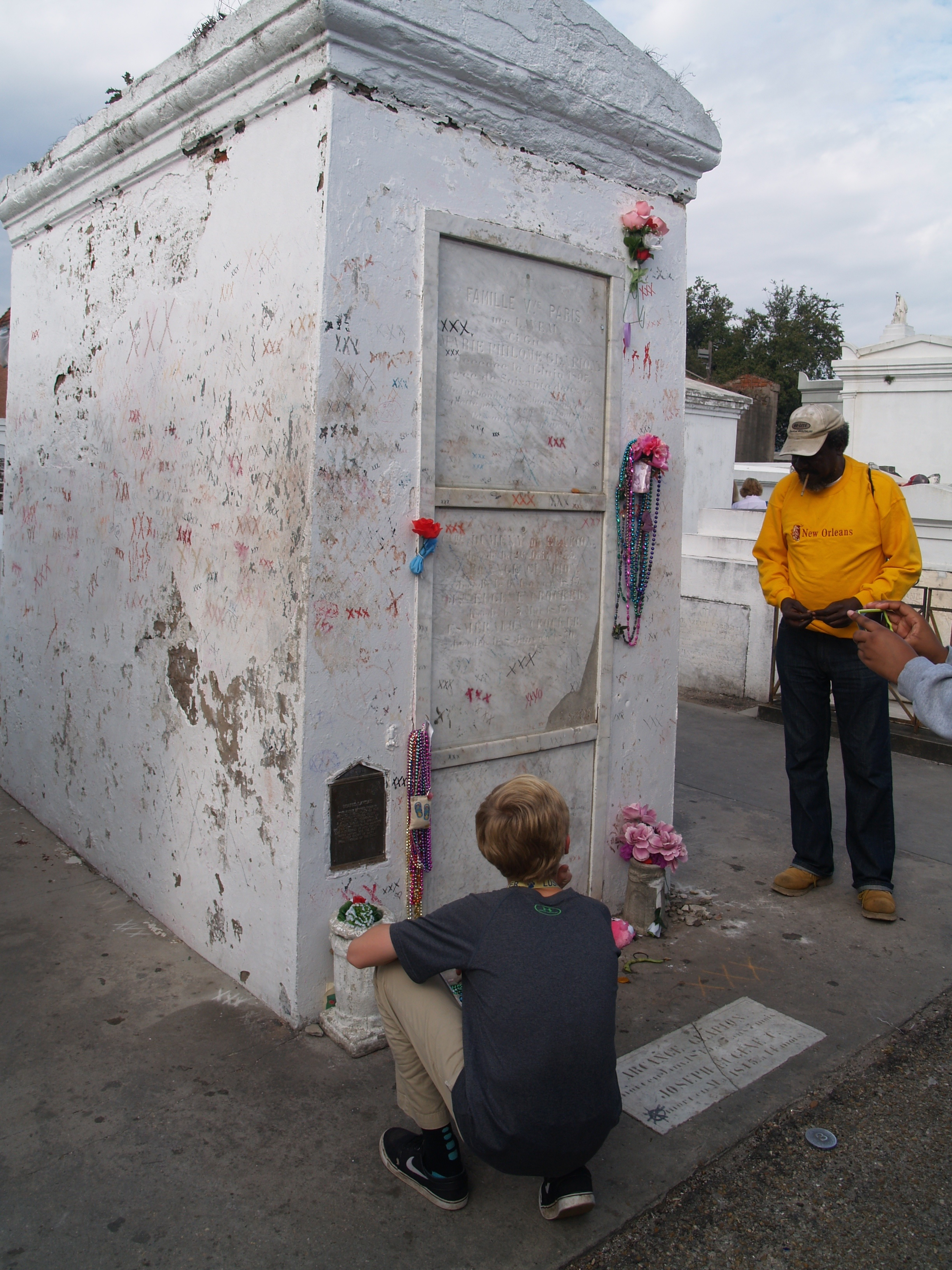
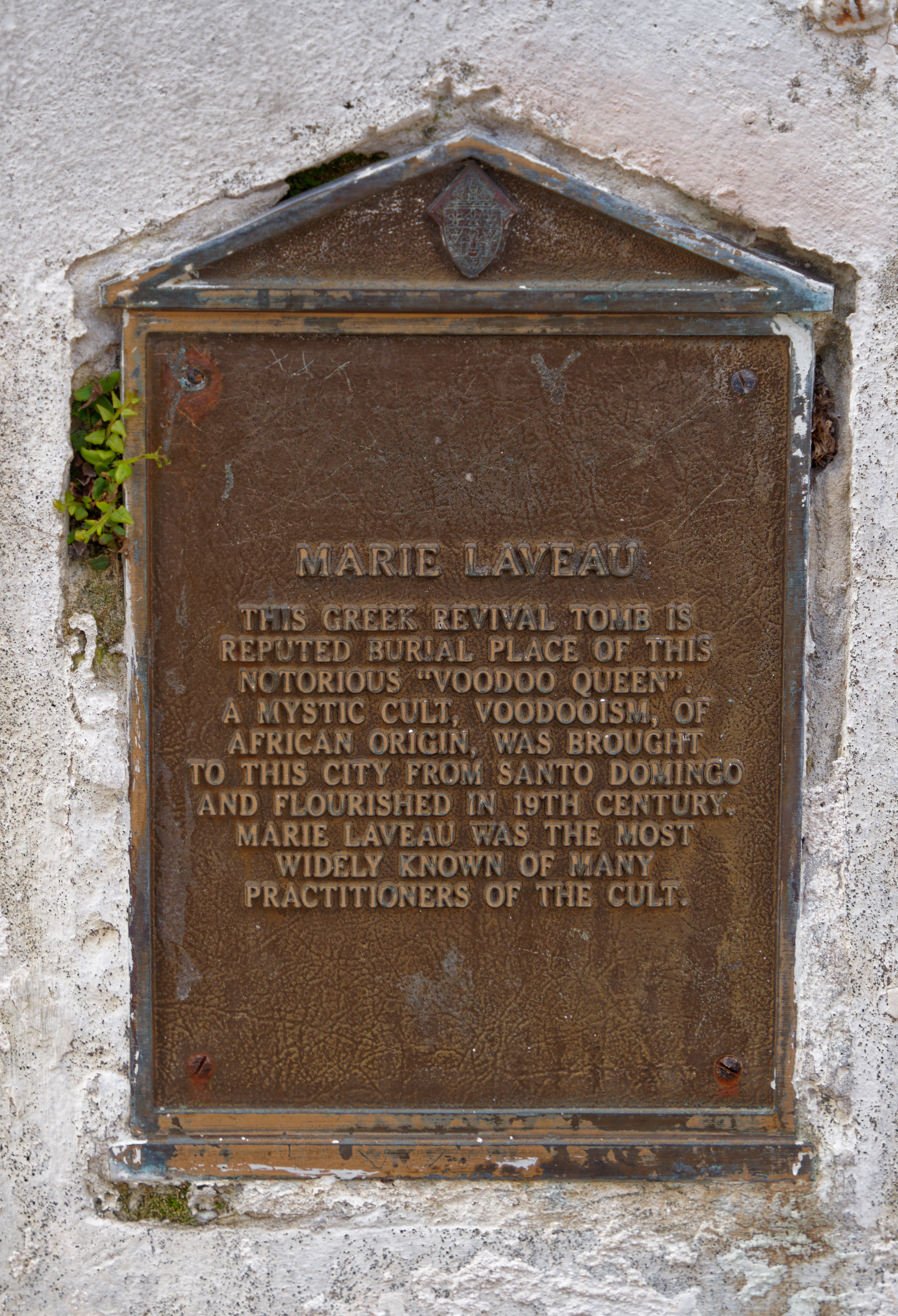
One of the most prominent figures in 19th-century Voodoo was Marie Laveau, whose alleged tomb remains a visitor attraction

Anderson argued that Voodoo remained a vibrant religion into the late 19th century, at which it went into decline. The last significant evidence for Voodoo as a living tradition in the Upper Mississippi Valley was from a late 19th-century article by Mary Alicia Owen. By the early 20th century, there were no longer any publicly prominent Voodoo practitioners active in New Orleans, and after the early 1940s there was no more evidence that Voodoo was being actively practiced. According to the historian Carolyn Morrow Long, "Voodoo, as an organized religion, had been thoroughly suppressed by the legal system, public opinion, and Christianity."

In the late 1930s and early 1940s, the first serious attempts to document Voodoo's history were made. As part of the government's Works Progress Administration, the Federal Writers' Project financed fieldworkers to interview seventy elderly black New Orleanians regarding their experience with Voodoo as it existed between the 1870s and 1890s; many recounted tales of Marie Laveau. This interview material was used as a partial basis for the journalist Robert Tallant's Voodoo in New Orleans; first published in 1946, it engaged in sensationalist coverage although came to be regarded as the pre-eminent work on the subject throughout the century.

As Voodoo, a communal religion devoted to worshiping deities and ancestors, declined, a belief in both benevolent and malevolent supernaturalism, coupled with various practices to control and influence events, survived, often being termed hoodoo. In New Orleans, hoodoo displayed greater Catholic influences than similar African American folk practices elsewhere in the southern states. Specialists in hoodoo, known as "doctors" or "workers", often worked out of their homes or shops providing gris-gris, powders, oils, perfume, and incense to clients. Such practices concerned the Anglo-Protestant elite, with regulations being introduced to restrict various healing and fortune-telling practices in the city, resulting in many hoodoo practitioners being convicted, and either fined or imprisoned, in the first half of the 20th century.

Elements of Voodoo were incorporated into the black Spiritual churches whose teachings drew upon Catholicism, Spiritualism, and Pentecostalism. These Spiritual churches shared some of Voodoo's practices, including an emphasis on healing and on obtaining advice from spirits, and similarly shared a clear Catholic influence. Despite this, Afro-Creole Spiritualists often drew a firm distinction between their practices and Voodoo. Some commentators have argued that Voodoo survived in the form of the Spiritual church movement. Anderson argued against the notion that Voodoo transformed into the Spiritual Churches, stressing the fact that key elements of Voodoo are absent from these organisations.

== Demographics ==
Anderson suggested that Louisiana Voodoo had involved "a substantial segment of the Mississippi River valley's population". In 1873, the Times Picayune estimated that there were about 300 dedicated practitioners of Voodoo in New Orleans, with about a thousand looser adherents. Anderson suggested that the majority of both Voodoo practitioners and leaders were women. Most Voodoo priestesses, and a significant proportion of the religion's followers, were free women of color. Anderson thought that the female dominance reflected the fact that women could be priestesses in many African traditional religions, and potentially because in Louisiana, women were disproportionately highly represented among freed persons of color, having been freed from slavery by their white lovers.

Fandrich believed that Voodoo had "widespread support" in 19th-century New Orleans, principally among women of color. Fandrich noted that historical accounts suggest that Voodoo groups were "consistently racially integrated", comprising members of various racial groups. The 19th-century police raids that arrested Voodoo practitioners consistently caught up white women, and oral accounts recorded in the 1930s and 1940s suggest that many of Marie Laveau's followers and clients had been white. The 19th-century accounts suggest that white involvement was always a minority in Voodoo.

== Reception and legacy ==
Like New Orleans itself, Louisiana Voodoo has long evoked both "fascination and disapproval" from the Anglo-dominated American mainstream. Louisiana Voodoo has gained negative connotations in wider American society, being linked to witchcraft and hexing; Protestant groups, including those present among the black New Orleanian population, have denounced Voodoo as devil worship. During the 19th century, many Anglo-Protestant arrivals to New Orleans also considered Voodoo a threat to public safety and morality; white writers in the late 19th century often expressed concern about the opportunities for miscegenation provided by Voodoo ceremonies, especially the presence of white women near to black men. By the late 20th century, it was gaining increasing recognition as a legitimate religion of the African diaspora.

=== Tourism ===
A sign for the New Orleans Historic Voodoo Museum, an attraction catering to tourist interest in Voodoo

The civil rights movement of the 1950s and 1960s marked a new period in which the New Orleans tourist industry increasingly recognized African American culture as an integral aspect of the city's heritage. From the 1960s onward, the city's tourist industry increasingly referenced Louisiana Voodoo as a means of attracting visitors. In 1972, Charles Gandolfo established the tourist-oriented New Orleans Historic Voodoo Museum. In New Orleans' French Quarter, as well as through mail-order catalogs and later the Internet, salespeople began selling paraphernalia that they claimed was associated with Voodoo.

Several companies also began providing walking tours of the city, pointing out locations alleged to have a prominent role in the history of Voodoo, and in some cases staging Voodoo rituals for paying onlookers. One company, Voodoo Authentica, began organizing an annual Voodoofest in Congo Square each Halloween, involving various stalls selling food and paraphernalia and a public Voodoo ceremony.

=== Revivalist movements ===
The closing decades of the 20th century saw a resurgence of people claiming to practice Voodoo in New Orleans, a phenomenon reflecting some survivals from earlier practices, some imports from other African diasporic traditions, and some consciously revivalist approaches. Long believed that these groups reflected a "Voodoo revival" rather than a direct continuation of 18th and 19th century traditions; she noted that this new Voodoo typically resembled Haitian Vodou or Santería more than the 19th-century Louisiana Voodoo. Anderson deemed the link between the historical tradition and the revivalist practices to be "quite tenuous", stating that "today's New Orleans Voodoo" is "an emerging faith inspired by and seeking to reconstruct the older religion".

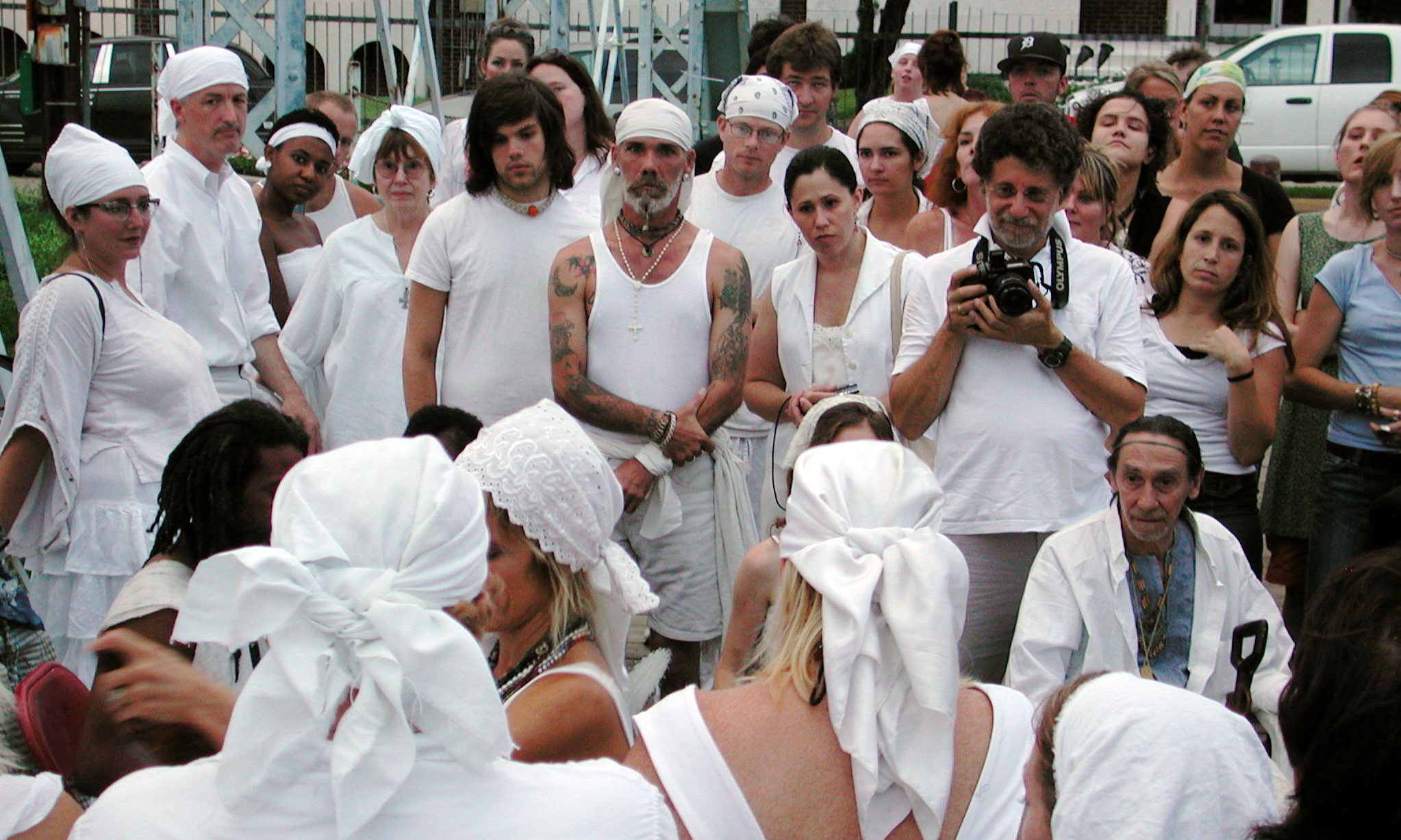
A group of Voodoo revivalists assembling at the Bayou St. John swing bridge on St John's Eve 2007

This revival was established through the efforts of several different groups. In 1990, the African American Miriam Chamani established the Voodoo Spiritual Temple in New Orleans' French Quarter, which venerated deities from Haitian Vodou and Cuban Santería. A Ukrainian-Jewish American initiate of Haitian Vodou, Sallie Ann Glassman, launched another group, La Source Ancienne, in the Bywater neighborhood; she also operated the Island of Salvation Botanica store. The most publicly prominent of the new Voodoo practitioners was Ava Kay Jones, a Louisiana Creole woman who had been initiated into both Haitian Vodou and Orisha-Vodu, a U.S.-based derivative of Santería.

These revivalists promoted their religion through websites, newsletters, and workshops. Long noted that the "Voodoo revival" had attracted many "well-educated" and middle-class Americans, both black and white. Glassman's group has been described as having a white-majority membership.

=== In popular culture ===
Sensationalist portrayals of Voodoo have featured in a range of films and popular novels. The 1987 film Angel Heart connected Louisiana Voodoo with Satanism; the 2004 film The Skeleton Key evoked many older stereotypes although made greater reference to the actual practices of Louisiana Voodoo. The 2009 Disney film The Princess and the Frog, which is set in New Orleans, depicted the characters of Mama Odie and Doctor Facilier as practitioners of Voodoo, being used for good and evil respectively. Characters practicing Louisiana Voodoo were also incorporated into the 2013 U.S. television series American Horror Story: Coven.

Voodoo also influenced popular music, as seen in songs like Jimi Hendrix's "Voodoo Chile" and Colin James' "Voodoo Thing". The New Orleans singer Mac Rebennack took on the stage name of Dr. John after the 19th-century Voodoo practitioner and made heavy use of Voodoo terminology and aesthetics in his music; his first album, released in 1968, was titled Gris-Gris.
