= Harry P. Glassman =

American judge

Harry Paul Glassman (February 21, 1928 – May 15, 1981) was an American lawyer, academic, and jurist.

Born in New York City, he served in the United States Army. He received his bachelors and law degrees from University of California, Berkeley and practiced law in California. He then received his master's degree from the University of Virginia. In 1962, he became a professor of law at the University of Maine School of Law. In 1972, he was appointed a Maine superior court judge and then in 1979, Glassman was appointed associate justice of the Maine Supreme Judicial Court serving until his death. His wife was Caroline Duby Glassman who also served on the Maine Supreme Judicial Court.
