= Sallie Ann Glassman =

American writer

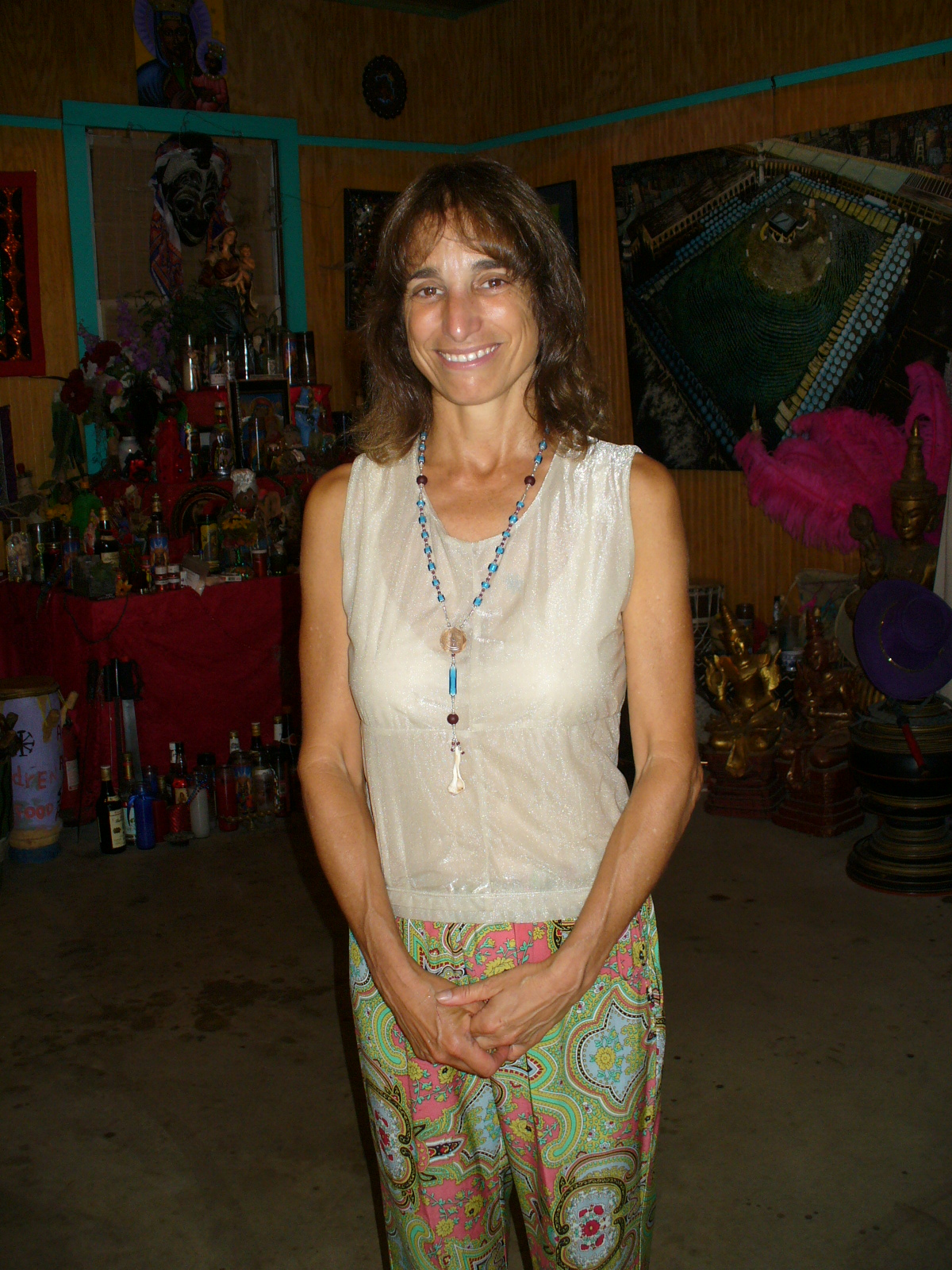
- Glassman in 2009
- Born: 1954 (age 71–72); Kennebunkport, Maine, U.S.
- Writing career
- Subjects: Vodou, tarot
- Notable work: The New Orleans Voodoo Tarot

Sallie Ann Glassman (born 1954) is an American practitioner of Vodou, a writer, and an artist. She was born in Kennebunkport, Maine, and is a self-described "Ukrainian Jew from Maine", and a former member of Ordo Templi Orientis.

Glassman has been practicing Vodou in New Orleans since 1977. In 1995, she became one of few white Americans to have been ordained via the traditional Haitian initiation. She owns the Island of Salvation Botanica, an art gallery with both religious supplies, and Haitian and local artworks. Glassman has been called one of New Orleans' "most visible practitioners" of vodou.

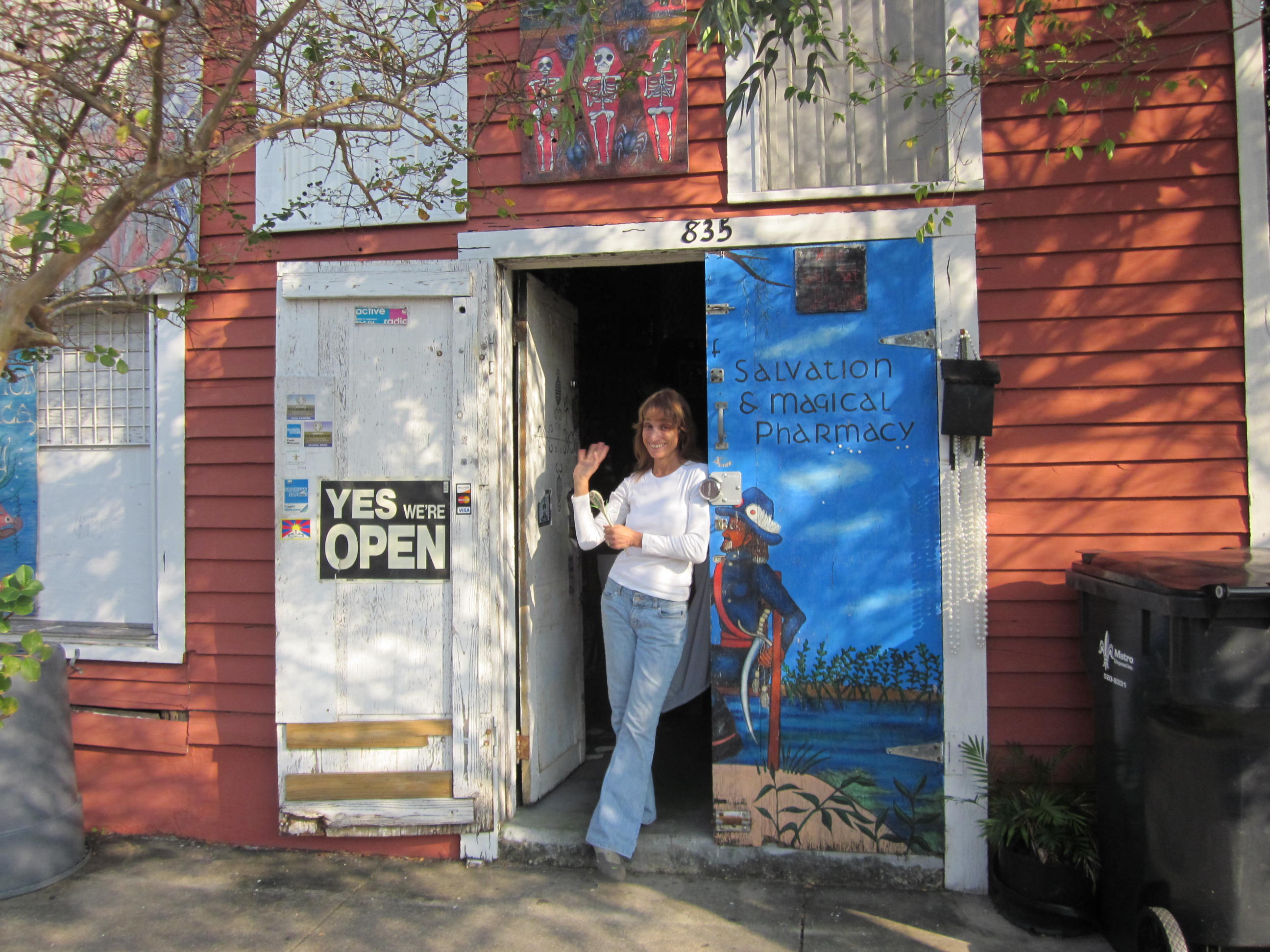
Glassman at the doorway of the original location of Island of Salvation Botanica on Piety Street in the Bywater neighborhood of New Orleans; the Botanica has since moved to larger quarters in the New Orleans Healing Center on St. Claude Avenue in Faubourg Marigny.

== Art ==
Glassman's art is both esoteric and syncretic. She has produced two major non-traditional tarot packs: the Enochian Tarot, which is derived from the Enochian magical system of Elizabethan magician Doctor John Dee, and the New Orleans Voodoo Tarot, which replaces the standard four tarot suits with depictions of the spirits of the major strands of Vodou (Petro, Congo, Rada) and Santería practices.

In 1992, Glassman published a set of tarot cards called the New Orleans Voodoo Tarot. The cards depict black people, which was unusual for the time. The cards feature prominent Orisha divinities (Obatala, Oshun, Ogun, Yemaya, and Shango), classical Haitian Vodou spirits (Damballah-Wedo, Ezili-Freda, and Guede), and priests of Louisiana Voodoo such as Marie Laveau and Dr. John.

The tarot cards came with a book co-written with Louis Martinié, an advocate for New Orleans style Voodoo in the spectrum of New World religious practices.

== Media ==
Glassman was mentioned in a 1995 article in The New York Times, and in a 2003 MSNBC interview, she claimed she cured her own cancer using Vodou in 2003.

She appeared in the 2006 film Hexing a Hurricane. Her New Orleans Voodoo Tarot was also an influence on the first album by the band Sun God.

== Bibliography ==
- Martinié, Louis; Glassman, Sallie Ann (1992). The New Orleans Voodoo Tarot. Destiny Books. ISBN 0-89281-363-6.
- Schueler, Gerald; Schueler, Betty; Glassman, Sallie Ann (2000). Enochian Tarot. Llewellyn Publications. ISBN 1-56718-620-3.
- Glassman, Sallie Ann (2007). Vodou Visions: An Encounter With Divine Mystery (2nd ed.). Island of Salvation Botanica. ISBN 978-0-9794554-0-7.
