= Caroline Duby Glassman =

American judge

- Glassman taking the oath of office in 1983

Associate Justice of the Maine Supreme Judicial Court
- In office 1983–1997
- Nominated by: Joseph E. Brennan; John McKernan Jr.
- Preceded by: Gene Carter
- Succeeded by: Leigh Saufley

Personal details
- Born: Caroline Duby; September 13, 1922 Baker, Oregon
- Died: July 10, 2013 (aged 90) Portland, Maine
- Spouse(s): Harry P. Glassman (1953-1981; his death; 1 child)
- Education: Eastern Oregon University; Willamette University College of Law

Caroline Duby Glassman (September 13, 1922 – July 10, 2013) was an American attorney and former jurist in the state of Maine. A native of Oregon, she completed college and law school in that state before moving to Portland, Maine, where she practiced law with her husband Harry P. Glassman. In 1983, she became the first woman to serve on the Maine Supreme Judicial Court.

== Early life ==
Caroline Duby was born on September 13, 1922, to Caroline Marie (née Colton) and Charles Ferdinand Duby in the Eastern Oregon city of Baker (now Baker City). Her great-grandmother on her father's side had been part of the Nez Perce tribe of Native Americans, with her father also of French heritage. Duby grew up in Eastern Oregon where she attended the public schools in Baker and neighboring Keating. After high school she enrolled at Eastern Oregon College of Education (now Eastern Oregon University) in La Grande.

In 1941, she graduated from the school with honors and an associate degree. Caroline then entered law school at Willamette University College of Law in Salem, Oregon, where she was one of only two women at the school. Both her father and the dean discouraged her from attending the school. She roomed off-campus with her other female classmate after the school consented, but only upon gaining permission from each student's parents. The two boarded together until the other dropped out after two years. Caroline graduated from Willamette summa cum laude in 1944 with a bachelor of laws degree.

== Legal career ==
After passing the Oregon bar in 1944, she began practicing law in Salem for the Salem Title Insurance Company. She worked there from 1944 until 1946, and then moved to California where she became an associate of Melvin Belli in San Francisco in 1952. In 1953, she married Harry Paul Glassman in San Francisco, and they had a son, Max. She continued working for Belli until 1960 when the family moved to Maine.

From 1967 to 1968 she lectured at the University of Maine School of Law. Caroline Glassman returned to practicing law in 1969 as a sole practitioner, and continued until 1974 when she joined the law firm of Glassman & Potter in Portland, Maine. She continued with the firm until 1979 when she joined Glassman, Beagle & Ridge. Her husband Harry served on the Maine Supreme Judicial Court from 1979 until his death in 1981. Glassman served as the president of the Cumberland Bar Association in 1982 and was on the state bar association's board of governors from 1982 to 1983.

=== Judicial career ===
On July 7, 1983, Maine Governor Joseph E. Brennan nominated Glassman to replace Gene Carter on the Maine Supreme Judicial Court. She was confirmed by the Maine State Senate on August 4, in a unanimous vote. Glassman was sworn into office on August 30 as the 93rd justice in the court's history and became the first woman to ever serve on what is that state's highest court.

While on the bench, she received several honorary degrees, including from the University of New England in 1985, Bowdoin College in 1986, Husson College in 1989, and finally in 1994 from her alma mater, Willamette University College of Law. In 1990, Maine Governor John McKernan Jr. nominated Glassman for a second seven-year term on the court, and she was once again confirmed by the state senate. In early 1997 she announced she would not seek a third term, but hoped her replacement would be another woman. Glassman sought retirement before she felt burnt out and in order to become more involved in community activities that the rules of judicial conduct would otherwise prohibit. She left the bench on September 1, 1997.

== Later life ==
After leaving the bench she was involved with the Russian American Rule of Law Commission between Maine and the Russian city of Archangel. The women's section of Maine's bar association created the Caroline Duby Glassman Award in 1993. She lived in Portland, Maine. Glassman died on July 10, 2013, at the age of 90 at the Maine Medical Center in Portland.

== See also ==
- List of female state supreme court justices

Legal offices
Preceded by Gene Carter	Associate Justice of the Maine Supreme Judicial Court; 1983 – 1997	Succeeded by Leigh Saufley
