= Miriam Chamani =

American Louisiana Voodoo practitioner (born 1943)

- Born: September 10, 1943; Jackson, Mississippi
- Died: 16 August 2026 (aged 82)
- Other name: Mary Robin Adams
- Known for: Voodoo Priestess, Founder of the New Orleans Voodoo Spiritual Temple

Priestess Miriam Chamani (born September 10, 1943; Mary Robin Adams, Jackson, Mississippi, died August 16, 2026) was the Mambo (Mother/Priestess) and co-founder of the New Orleans Voodoo Spiritual Temple.

== Biography ==
Raised in Mississippi, Chamani said she has had visions and mystical experiences since childhood. She became a Christian at age eleven, and would often go off by herself to pray and talk to the spirits. In 1975, after living in New York and then Chicago she became interested in the Spiritual church, and left the Baptist faith in which she'd been raised. During this time, she also worked as an operating room technician in a Chicago hospital.

In 1982 Chamani was ordained a bishop in the "Angel Angel All Nations Spiritual Church". In 1989 she met Oswan Chamani; they were married in 1990, and would go on to found the New Orleans Voodoo Spiritual Temple together. After his death on March 6, 1995, Miriam Chamani continued her husband's Belizan Vodou and herbalism traditions, in addition to her own spiritualist practices. She continues many of the inclusive trends of Black Christian Spiritualism, seeking to serve all peoples regardless of race or belief. She is presently married to environmentalist Allen Villeneuve.

Chamani has been featured in numerous documentaries and articles. She appeared in The New York Times in articles about Voodoo and events in New Orleans, as well as features in Spin Magazine, in movies, and on PBS and commercial TV in America, England and Japan. She was invited by actor Nicolas Cage to perform a blessing ceremony during his wedding to Lisa Marie Presley, after hiring her as a consultant for his directorial debut film Sonny.

On Halloween 1999, a local radio station asked her to perform a ceremony outside the Superdome to help the New Orleans Saints win against the Cleveland Browns (which was interrupted by harassment from a Browns fan dressed as a dog). She claims to have had better results helping the Spurs win the NBA championship in 2004.

== Death ==
Louis Martinié, New Orleans artist and drummer for the New Orleans Voodoo Spiritual Temple reported that Priestess Miriam passed on Sunday, August 16, 2026 on a Facebook post.

== New Orleans Voodoo Spiritual Temple ==
The Temple was established in 1990 by Priest Oswan Chamani and Miriam Chamani. It is located in the French Quarter next to Congo Square, and its rituals are directly connected to those performed on Congo Square by Marie Laveau and Doctor John.

== Partial discography ==
- Voodoo - (2004) CD recorded at the Voodoo Spiritual Temple. Jose Suescun Music Distribution
