= List of Haitian artists =

This page provides a list of Haitian artists. People on this list were either born in Haiti or possess Haitian citizenship. Due to Haitian nationality laws, dual citizenship is now permitted by the Constitution of Haiti, therefore people of Haitian ancestry born outside of the country are not included in this list, unless they have renounced their foreign citizenship or have resided extensively in Haiti and made significant contributions to Haitian government or society. The list includes both native born and naturalized Haitians, as well as permanent foreign residents who have been recognized internationally for artistic reasons. If not indicated here, their birth in Haiti and notability are mentioned in their main article.

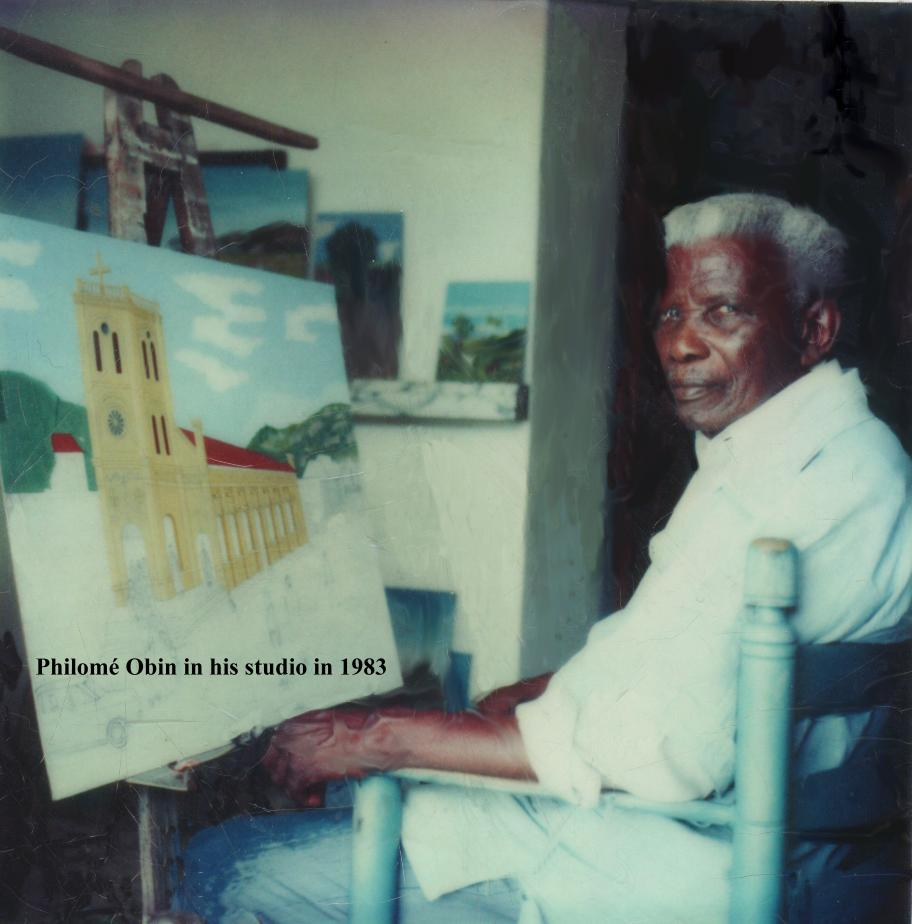
Painter, Philomé Obin

A master painter and main contributors to the Saint Soleil art movement, Levoy Exil

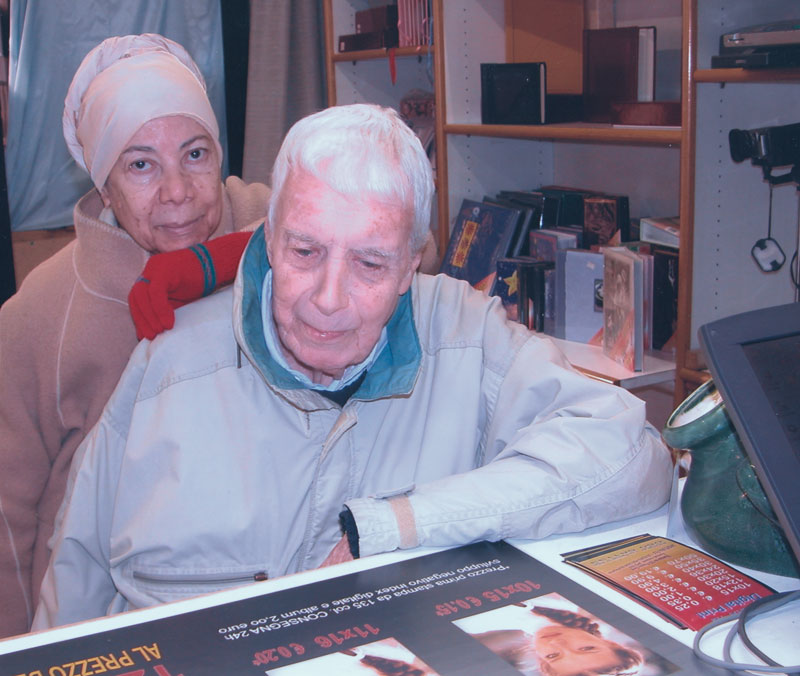
Jacqueline Nesti Joseph with her husband, Victor

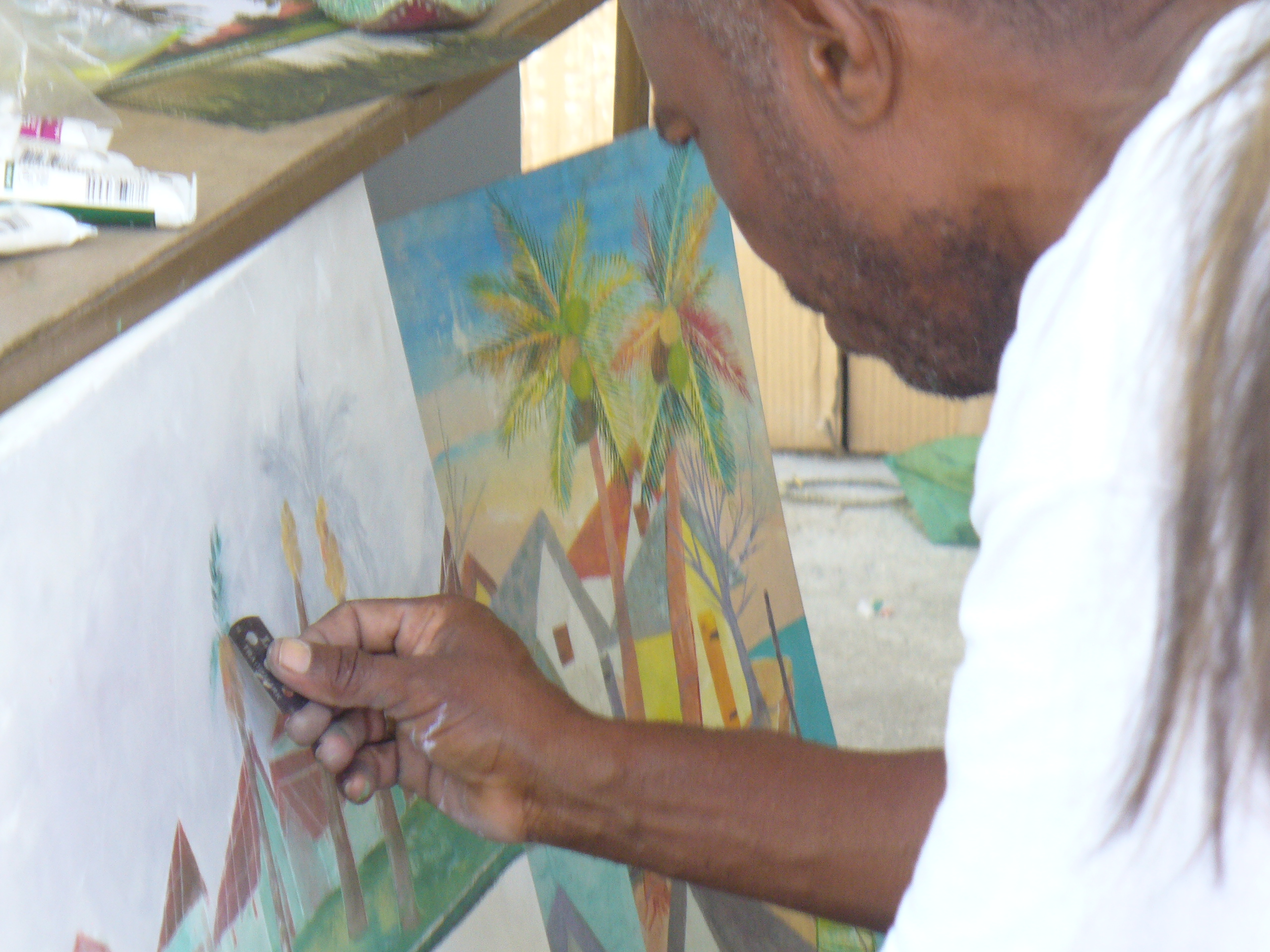
Nicolas Dreux using razor blade to create a fine oil painting

== A ==
- Gesner Abelard (born 1922) – painter and sculptor
- Gabriel Alix (1930–1998) – painter
- Ralph Allen – painter
- Jackson Ambroise (born 1952) – painter
- Sergine André (born 1969) – painter
- Montas Antoine (1926–1988) – painter
- Arijac (born 1937) – painter
- Gesner Armand (1936–2008) – painter
- Georges Auguste (1846–1935) – painter

== B ==
- Castera Bazile (1923–1966) – painter
- Thony Belizaire (1955–2013) – photographer and photojournalist
- Rigaud Benoit (1911–1986) – one of the three or four most highly prized Haitian artists
- Wilson Bigaud (1931–2010) – painter
- Roland Blain (1934–2005) – painter
- Serge Moléon Blaise (born 1951) – painter
- Gérald Bloncourt (1926–2018) – painter and photographer
- Ludovic Booz (1940–2015) – painter and sculptor
- Maurice Borno (1917–1955) – painter
- Jean-Baptiste Bottex (1918–1979) – painter
- Seymour Etienne Bottex (1922–1998) – painter
- Henry-Robert Brésil (1952–1999) – painter
- Murat Brierre (1938–1988) – one of Haiti's principal metal sculptors
- Bourmond Byron (1920–2004) – painter

== C ==
- Widline Cadet (born 1992) – photographer
- Laurent Casimir (1928–1990) – artist
- Jean-Claude Castera (born 1939) – painter
- Dieudonné Cédor (1925–2010) – painter
- Ralph Chapoteau (born 1954) – painter
- Charles Frédéric Chassériau (1802–1896) – chief architect of Marseille and Algiers
- Etienne Chavannes (born 1939) – painter
- Myrland Constant (born 1968) – textile artist

== D ==
- Claude Dambreville (born 1934) – writer and painter
- Villard Denis (1940-2004) – painter and poet
- Rose-Marie Desruisseau (1933-1988) – painter
- Philippe Dodard (born 1954) – graphic artist and painter
- Roland Dorcely (1930–2017) – painter
- Nicolas Dreux (born 1956) – painter
- Abner Dubic (born 1944) – painter
- Gervais Emmanuel Ducasse (1903–1988) – painter
- Préfète Duffaut (1923–2012) – painter
- Edouard Duval-Carrié (born 1954) – painter and sculptor

== E ==
- Levoy Exil (born 1944) – major contributor to the Saint Soleil art movement

== F ==
- Gérard Fombrun (1927–2015) – sculptor

== G ==
- Jacques Gabriel (1934–1988) – painter
- Paul Gardère (1944–2011) – visual artist
- Jean-Claude Garoute (1935–2006) – painter and sculptor
- Jackson Georges (born 1974) – painter
- Max Gerbier (born 1951) – painter
- Jacques-Enguerrand Gourgue (1930–1996) – one of Haiti's most renowned painters of the 20th century
- Alexandre Grégoire (1922–2001) – painter
- Adler Guerrier (born 1975) – photographer

== H ==
- Georges Hector (1939–1990) – painter
- Edith Hollant (born 1938) – photographer and painter
- Hector Hyppolite (1894–1948) – painter

== J ==
- Eugène Jean (1714–1734) – painter
- Jean-Baptiste Jean (1953–2002) – painter
- Nehemy Jean (born 1931) – painter and graphic artist
- Eric Jean-Louis (born 1957) – painter
- Jean-René Jérôme (1942–1991) – painter, and considered one of Haiti's greatest artists
- Serge Jolimeau (born 1952) – sculptor
- Antonio Joseph (1921–2016) – painter, sculptor, and screen-printer
- Jacqueline Nesti Joseph (born 1932) – painter
- Leonel Jules (born 1953) – painter
- André Juste (born 1957) – sculptor

== L ==
- Gisou Lamothe (1935–2020) – painter and sculptor
- Lyonel Laurenceau (born 1942) – painter
- Peterson Laurent (1888–1958) – painter
- Luckner Lazard (1928–1998) – painter and sculptor
- André LeBlanc (1921–1998) – renowned comic book artist

== M ==
- Stevenson Magloire (1963–1994) – painter
- Andrée Malebranche (1916–2013) – painter
- Albert Mangonès (1917-2002) – architect
- Madsen Mompremier (born 1952) – painter

== N ==
- Marie-José Nadal-Gardère (1931–2020) – painter and sculptor

== O ==
- Charles Obas (born 1927) – painter
- Philomé Obin (1892–1986) – painter

== P ==
- Francis Paraison (1958–2003) – painter
- Salnave Philippe-Auguste (1908–1989) – painter, joined Le Centre d'Art in 1960.
- Prosper Pierre-Louis (1947–1997) – artist, painter; and one of the main contributors to the local school of the Saint Soleil art movement
- Guerdy J. Préval (born 1950) – painter and essayist
- Barbara Prézeau-Stephenson (born 1965) – painter, sculptor, land art

== R ==
- Samuel Roker (born 1953) – painter

== S ==
- Louisiane Saint Fleurant (1924–2005) – artist and painter
- Petion Savain (1906-1973) – prolific painter
- Galland Semerand (1953–2019) – painter and architect
- Micius Stephane (1912–2012) – painter

== T ==
- Hervé Télémaque – surrealist painter, curator
- Sacha Thébaud (1934–2004) – aka "Tebó", artist, sculptor, architect, furniture designer and known for encaustics in international contemporary fine art
- François Turenne des Pres (1907–1990)

== W ==
- Edouard Wah (1939–2003) – painter

== Bibliography ==
- Schutt-Ainé, Patricia; Staff of Librairie Au Service de la Culture (1994). Haiti: A Basic Reference Book. Miami, Florida: Librairie Au Service de la Culture. ISBN 978-0-9638599-0-7.
