= List of Dominican Republic women artists =

This is a list of women artists who were born in Dominican Republic or whose artworks are closely associated with that country.

== B ==
- Firelei Báez (born 1981), Dominican-born American artist known for intricate works on paper and canvas, as well as large scale sculpture; born in Santiago de los Caballeros and lives in New York City.
- Sonia Báez-Hernández (born 1958), Dominican-born Puerto Rican interdisciplinary artist.
- Ada Balcácer (born 1930), multidisciplinary visual artist, whose artistic production ranges from painted works, textile designs, murals, and printmaking; born in Santo Domingo

== C ==
- Lizania Cruz (born 1983), Dominican-born American visual artist, designer and participatory artist

== G ==
- Zenobia Galar (born 1958), painter
- Iliana Emilia García (born 1970), Dominican-born, American visual artist and sculptor
- Scherezade García (born 1966), Dominican-born American painter, printmaker, and installation artist
- Hulda Guzmán (born 1964), figurative painter

== H ==
- Quisqueya Henríquez (born 1966), Cuban-born Santo Domingo-based multidisciplinary artist

== L ==
- Clara Ledesma (1924–1999), Dominican-born American painter

== N ==
- Elsa Núñez (born 1943), abstract artist, painter; born in Santo Domingo

== P ==
- Raquel Paiewonsky (born 1969), Dominican painter of Lithuanian descent
- Olivia Peguero (born 1961), Dominican-born American contemporary landscape and botanical painter and sculptor

== R ==
- Belkis Ramírez (1957–2019), printmaker and installation artist

== S ==
- Amaya Salazar (born 1951), painter
- Julia Santos Solomon (born 1956), multidisciplinary artist including work in illustration, drawing, painting, sculpture, fashion design, landscape, and mural painting

== T ==
- Rosa Tavarez (1939–2023), painter and engraver

== W ==
- Delia Weber (1900–1982), painter, teacher, poet, film actress, and feminist
- Celeste Woss y Gil (1891–1985), painter, educator, and feminist activist

== See also ==
- List of people from the Dominican Republic
- List of artists from the Dominican Republic
