= Leonel =

Leonel is a given name. Notable people with the name include:

- Leonel Altobelli (born 1986), Argentine footballer
- Leonel Álvarez (born 1965), former Colombian football defensive midfielder
- Leonel Bastos or Lionel Bastos, singer, songwriter and music producer
- Leonel Beaudoin or Léonel Beaudoin (1924–2021), Canadian politician and insurance agent
- Leonel Brizola (1922–2004), Brazilian politician
- Leonel Campos, baseball player
- Leonel Cárcamo (born 1965), retired Salvadoran football player
- Leonel Conde, retired Uruguayan football goalkeeper
- Fernando Leonel Cortés (born 1988), Mexican football striker
- Leonel Cubas (died 2007), football player from El Salvador
- Leonel da Silva Araujo, also known as Leonel (born 1986), football player
- Léonel de Moustier (1882–1945), French businessman and politician
- Leonel Fernández (born 1953), Dominican lawyer, academic, President of the Dominican Republic from 1996 to 2000, and from 2004 to 2012
- Leonel Galeano (born 1991), Argentine football defender
- Leonel García of Sin Bandera, a Latin pop duo based in Mexico
- Leonel Grave de Peralta (born 1976), Cuban activist and dissident
- Leonel Guevara (born 1983), Salvadoran footballer
- Álvaro Leonel Ramazzini Imeri (born 1947), bishop of the Catholic Church in Guatemala
- Leonel Jules, Contemporary Canadian painter from Montreal, Quebec, originally from Haiti
- Leonel Kaplan (born 1973), Argentine trumpet player
- Leonel Liberman (born 1972), former footballer
- Leonel Manzano (born 1984), American cross-country and track and field athlete
- Leonel Mário d'Alva (born 1935), São Toméan politician
- Leonel Marshall Steward, Sr. (born 1954), Cuban former volleyball player
- Leonel Martiniano de Alencar, Baron of Alencar (1832–1921), Brazilian lawyer and diplomat, ambassador of Brazil
- Leonel Medeiros or Lionel Medeiros (born 1977), retired Portuguese footballer
- Leonel Mena (born 1982), Chilean Midfielder
- Leonel Cota Montaño (born 1958), Mexican politician
- Leonel Moreira (born 1990), Costa Rican football player
- Leonel Moura (born 1948), conceptual artist
- Leonel Munder (born 1988), male beach volleyball player from Cuba
- Leonel Noriega (born 1975), Guatemalan football midfielder
- Leonel Núñez (born 1984), Argentine football striker
- Leonel Olmedo (born 1981), Mexican footballer
- Leonel Paulo (born 1986), Angolan basketball player
- Leonel Pernía (born 1975), Argentine racing driver
- Leonel Pilipauskas (born 1975), Uruguayan footballer
- Leonel Pontes (born 1972), Portuguese football coach
- Leonel Power (1370–1445), English composer of the late Medieval and early Renaissance eras
- Leonel Godoy Rangel (born 1950), Mexican lawyer, politician and former Governor of Michoacán
- Leonel Reyes (born 1976), Bolivian football midfielder
- Leonel Ríos (born 1983), Argentine football midfielder
- Leonel Rocco (born 1966), former Uruguayan footballer
- Leonel Herrera Rojas (born 1978), former Chilean footballer
- Leonel Romero (born 1987), Peruvian football defender
- Leonel Saint-Preux (born 1985), Haitian footballer
- Leonel Sánchez (1936–2022), former professional football player
- Leonel Sharp (1559–1631), English churchman and courtier, royal chaplain, archdeacon of Berkshire
- Leonel Herrera Silva (born 1971), former Chilean footballer
- Leonel "Bebito" Smith (1909–2000), Cuban multiple gold medalist swimmer at the 1926 Central American Games in Mexico City
- Leonel Suárez (born 1987), male decathlete from Cuba
- Leonel Vangioni (born 1987), Argentine football left-winger
- António Leonel Vidigal or Toni Vidigal (born 1975), retired Portuguese professional footballer
- Leonel Vieira (born 1969), Portuguese film director
- Leonel Vielma (born 1978), Venezuelan football defender
- Luciano Leonel Cuello (born 1984), Argentine boxer in the Light Middleweight division
- Marcos Leonel Posadas (born 1938), Mexican politician
- Marvin Leonel Esch (1927–2010), politician from the U.S. state of Michigan
- Sergio Leonel "Kún" Agüero del Castillo or Sergio Agüero (born 1988), Argentine footballer

== See also ==
- Laionel
- Leonela
- Lionel (disambiguation)
- Lyonel
