= Jean-René =

Jean-René is a French masculine given name. Notable people with the name include:

- Jean-René Akono (born 1967), Cameroonian volleyball player
- Jean René Allard (1930–2020), a former politician in Manitoba, Canada
- Jean-René Asseline (died 1813), French bishop and theologian
- Jean René Baroux (1922–1992), a veteran of the second world war and writer
- Jean René Bazaine (1904–2001), a French painter
- Jean-Rene Belizar (born 1988), Sint Maarten cricketer
- Jean-René Bernaudeau (born 1956), a French former professional road bicycle racer
- Jean-René Cazalets, French neuroscientist
- Jean-René Cazeneuve (born 1958), French politician
- Jean René Constant Quoy (1790–1869), a French zoologist
- Jean-René Cruchet (1875–1959), a French pathologist
- Jean-René Farthouat (1934–2020), French lawyer
- Jean-René Fournier (born 1957), Swiss politician
- Jean-René Fourtou (born 1939), French business executive
- Jean René Gauguin (1881–1961), a French/Danish sculptor
- Jean-René Germanier (born 1958), Swiss politician
- Jean-René Huguenin (1936–1962), French writer
- Jean-René Jérôme (1942–1991), a Haitian painter and sculptor
- Jean-René Lecerf (born 1951), a French politician and a member of the Senate of France
- Jean-René Ledru (born 1947), French former rugby league player
- Jean-René Lemoine (born 1959), Haitian director and playwright
- Jean-René Lisnard (born 1979), a professional tennis player from Monaco
- Jean-René Marsac (born 1954), a member of the National Assembly of France
- Jean René Moreaux (1758–1795), French commander
- Jean-René Saulière (1911–1999), French writer
- Jean-René Seurin (1900–1981), French sprinter
- Jean-René Sigault (born 1738), French surgeon
- Jean-René Toumelin (1942–2022), French sporting director
- Jean-René Van der Plaetsen (born 1962), French journalist ad writer
