= Moses Ros =

Dominican-American architect, sculptor, painter, printmaker and muralist

- Born: Moses Ros–Suárez; 1958 (age 67–68); United States
- Education: Pratt Institute
- Occupations: Architect, sculptor, painter, printmaker, muralist

Moses Ros–Suárez (born 1958) is a Dominican–American architect, sculptor, painter, printmaker and muralist who lives and works in New York City.

His work combines African, African American, Latino, and Caribbean identities. His art often includes text in both English and Spanish and features figures evoking Indians, conquerors and urban characters in places like the streets of New York or the beaches of Dominican Republic.

== Early life and education ==
Ros was born in the United States to Dominican parents. Ros received a bachelor's degree in architecture from the Pratt Institute and is a licensed architect in the state of New York. He incorporates his knowledge of architecture into his numerous sculptural designs for community centers, daycare facilities, and other public spaces.

== Career ==
His work is influenced by several art movements such as pop-art, French realism, abstraction and post-modern expressionism. It has a social and human context in its reflection of urban narratives of his contemporary times.

His printed collages combine recycled packaging and marketing materials of food and hygiene brands that blend the New York experience and his memories of childhood.

Ros is a member of the ArteLatAm, a collective of Latin American artists living in New York

He is also a co-founder of the Dominican York Proyecto GRÁFICA (DYPG) Collective, which includes the artists Carlos Almonte, Pepe Coronado, René de los Santos, Iliana Emilia García, Reynaldo García Pantaleón, Scherezade García, Alex Guerrero, Luanda Lozano Miguel Luciano, Chiqui Junior Mendoza, and Rider Ureña.

== Exhibitions ==
He has had one-person exhibitions at museums in the United States and the Caribbean, including the Bronx Museum of the Arts, the Yeshiva University Museum in New York, the Paterson Museum in New Jersey, and el Instituto de Cultura y Arte in Santiago, Republica Dominicana.

== Public art ==
Ros has created large-scale public art commissions for the City of New York and other urban centers in the United States. Awarded commissions for public sculpture include the New York Department of Cultural Affairs, the Bronx Council for the Arts, and the New York City Housing Authority, as well as for stained-glass windows for the Metropolitan Transit Authority.

Ros designed a large-scale stained-glass window titled Patriasana which is located at the Fordham Road station, Bronx, New York.

He created Love Supreme, a site-specific large-scale paper art installations in the windows of Fordham Plaza and was inspired by the Black Lives Matter movement.

Ross was commissioned by the Sugar Hill Children's Museum of Art & Storytelling to create a mural as a symbol of a protest for social justice. His work depicted three themes of social justice: class, race, and power.

He designed Unity Bridge as part of the exhibition River Rising at Starlight Park in the Bronx, New York. The work, which incorporates ceramic artworks created at the Bronx River Art Center, celebrates the cultural and artistic expression of the surrounding community.

== Collections ==
- Smithsonian American Art Museum
- Hood Museum of Art, Hanover, New Hampshire
- New York City Housing Authority
