= Mompremier =

Mompremier is a surname. Notable people with the surname include:

- Beatrice Mompremier (born 1996), American basketball player
- Ersulie Mompremier, Haitian artist
- Fredlin Mompremier (born 1996), Haitian footballer
- Madsen Mompremier (born 1952), Haitian oil painter
