= Montas =

Montas may refer to:

- Montas Antoine (born 1926), Haitian painter
- Frankie Montas (born 1993), Dominican baseball player
- Juan Temístocles Montás (born 1950), Minister of Economy, Planning and Development of the Dominican Republic, economist and academic
- Michèle Montas (born 1946), Haitian journalist and former United Nations spokesperson

== See also ==
- Monta, a given name
