= Roker (disambiguation) =

Roker is a seaside resort in North East England.

Roker may also refer to:

== People ==
- Al Roker (born 1954), American TV meteorologist
- J. Roker (1825–1830), English cricketer for Surrey
- Mickey Roker (1932–2017), American jazz drummer
- Raymond Roker (born 1968), Bahamian artist and magazine founder
- Ron Roker (born 1941), English singer and songwriter
- Roxie Roker (1929–1995), American actress
- Samuel Roker (born 1953), Haitian painter
- Wally Roker (1937–2015), American singer and music executive

== Other uses ==
- Thornback ray, or roker, a fish

== See also ==
- Roker Park, former football stadium in Roker, Sunderland
- Roker Park (park), municipal space in Roker, Sunderland
