= Francoise Jean =

Haitian painter

Francoise Jean is a Haitian painter. She was born in Les Anglais, Haiti on June 2, 1953. She has exhibited in Haiti, Martinique and Guadeloupe.

== Biography ==
Jean started drawing at an early age. When she was nine years old, she drew rural scenes on clothes for her mother to embroider. In her early teenage years, she moved to Port-au-Prince near noted artist Pétion Savain. In 1968, a year after the move, she began to paint with Savain until he died in 1973. She has been working with the painter Jean Richard Coachy since the passing of Savain.

Jean depicts only children, and does not paint adults. When questioned about the reasoning behind her subject matter choice, she states, "children are my source of inspiration." One of her paintings was purchased to represent "The International Year of Children" by the Food and Agriculture Organization (FAO) in Germany.

She currently lives in Pétion-Ville.
