= Baroux =

Baroux is a surname. Notable people with the surname include:

- Frédéric Salat-Baroux (born 1963), French civil servant
- Jean René Baroux (1922–1992), Moroccan writer
- Lucien Baroux (1888–1968), French actor
- Olivier Baroux (born 1964), French actor, comedian, writer and director
