= André Juste =

André Juste (born ca. 1957, Haiti) is an artist and art critic evolving in the New York art scene whose work has been reviewed in the New York Times and the Miami Herald and has been noted for defying stereotypes of Haitian art.

His sculpture "Pedro's Fire", though maintaining elements associated with the Haitian aesthetic, is an example of the new direction of the art produced by Haitian artists in the United States.

Other Haitian and Haitian-American artists considered to be part of this wave are his wife Vladimir Cybil Charlier with whom he has produced collaborative works and Rejin Leys with whom he has exhibited.

== Art criticism ==
Juste is also an art critic who is considered an expert on the work of Haitian artist Emmanuel Mérisier on which he has been interviewed by various publications.

He has contributed a chapter titled Haitian Art to Henry Louis Gates and Anthony Appiah's Africana: The Encyclopedia of the African and African American Experience.

== Notable exhibits ==
Juste's work appeared along Vladimir Cybil Charlier's in Négritude: Exit Art which took place in Manhattan in 2009 and was curated by Greg Tate and literary historian Rose Myriam Réjouis. The exhibit was reviewed by the New York Times.

Juste also had a hand in curating an exhibition held at the William Jennings Gallery at the Kenkeleba House in 2019 titled Passion and Perseverance in Haitian Art.
