= Lyonel =

Lyonel is a given name. Notable people with the name include:

- Lyonel Power (c. 1375-1445), English composer
- Sir Lyonel Tollemache, 4th Baronet (1854-1952), English landowner
- Lyonel Hildyard (1861-1931), English cricketer
- Lyonel Feininger (1871-1956), German-American painter and caricaturist
- Lyonel Makzume, (1923-1995), Turkish businessman and top taxpayer
- Lyonel Thomas Senter Jr. (1933-2011), United States federal judge
- Lyonel Laurenceau (born 1942), Haitian painter
- Lyonel Trouillot (born 1956), Haitian novelist and poet
- Lyonel Grant (born 1957), Maori master carver and sculptor
