= Serge Jolimeau =

Haitian metal sculptor (born 1952)

Serge Jolimeau is a Haitian metal sculptor born in Croix-des-Bouquets, Haiti in 1952. Renowned artists such as Georges Liautaud, Murat Brierre, the Louis-Juste brothers, and Gabriel Bien-Aimé were also from this same village.

== Biography ==
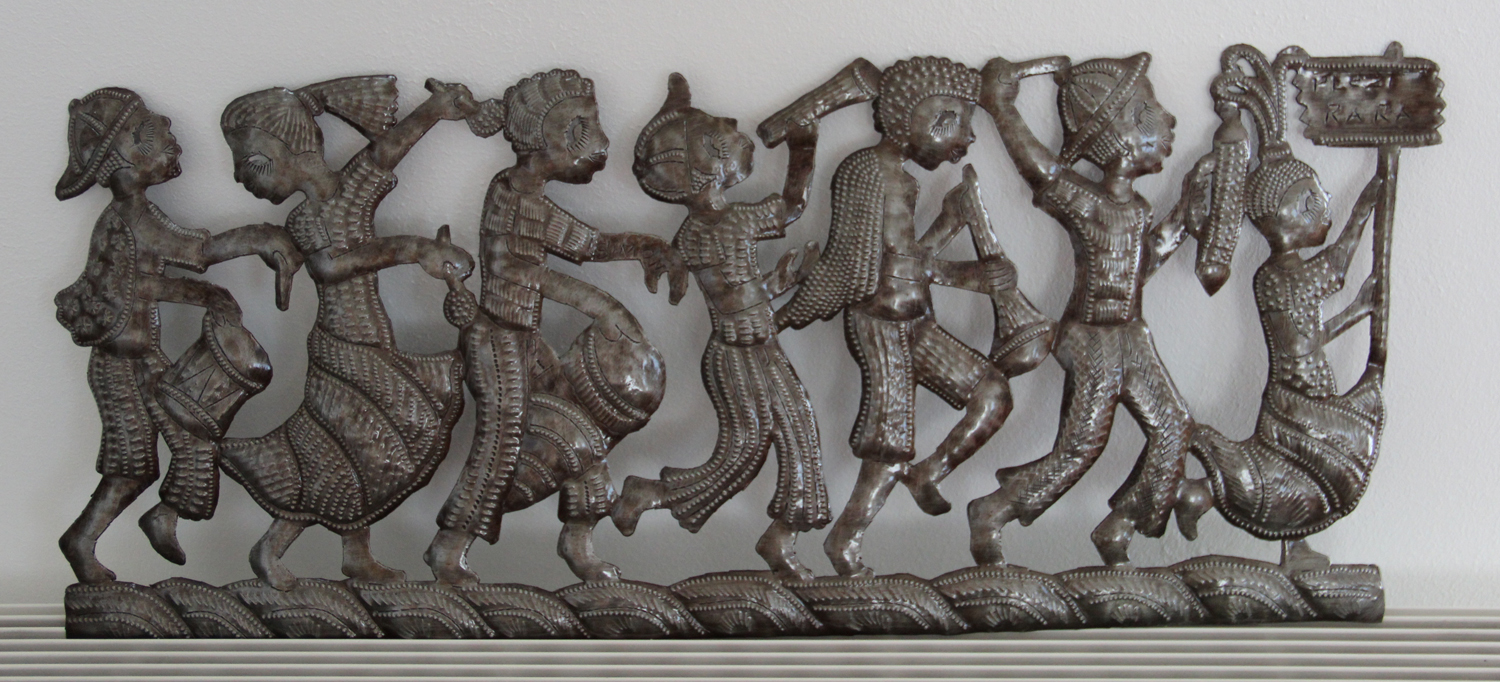
An example of Haitian metal sculpture

Jolimeau was an apprentice under Seresier Louis-Juste after high school, and joined the Centre d’Art, Haiti, in 1972 where he met his mentor Murat Brierre. He stands out with Gabriel Bien-Aimé as one of the most gifted metal sculptors (traditional sculptural art of carved metal, particularly from steel drums, inaugurated in Haiti by Georges Liautaud) of his generation. Jolimeau's stylization and fantastic complexity, grounded in voodoo inspiration, tends to produce works giving the impression of a metal lace. In 2009, Jolimeau along with Micah Ramil Remy and Toyin Folorunso were artists selected by Bill Clinton to create commemorative works for the Clinton Global Citizen Awards as part of the Clinton Global Initiative. At the end of 2010, following the Haiti earthquake and in cooperation with the Clinton Global Initiative, Macy's agreed to sell Croix-des-Bouquetes artisan created works from Jolimeau's shop in their stores throughout the United States. His artwork has been exhibited internationally since 1979. Jolimeau has participated in the Santa Fe International Folk Art Market annually since 2005.

== Principal expositions ==
- 1979 - Kunst aus Haiti, Staatlichen Kunsthalle, Berlin
- 1992 - A Haitian Celebration: Art and Culture, Milwaukee Art Museum, Milwaukee
- 1995 - Masterworks in Haitian Art from the Collection of the Davenport Museum, Davenport Museum of Art, Davenport
- 1997 - Haitian Art: Twenty Years of Collecting at the Waterloo Museum of Art, Waterloo Museum of Art, Waterloo, Iowa
- 1998 - Caribe: Exclusión, fragmentación y paraíso, Casa de America y Museo Extremeno Iberoamericano de Arte Contemporaneo, Madrid
- 2000 - Island Delights: The Spirit and Passion of Haitian Art, Tampa Museum of Art, Tampa
- 2004 - Lespri Endepandan: Discovering Haitian Sculpture, Frost Art Museum, Florida International University, Miami
- 2008 - Off the Wall, Pan American Art Projects, Miami
- 2012 - Outside the Box, Pan American Art Projects, Miami

== Public collections ==
- Brooklyn Museum
  - Crucifixion scene, 1981
- Milwaukee Art Museum
  - Démon, 1977
- Spencer Museum of Art :
  - Man and Goat
  - See Goddesses
  - Siren
  - Winged Stag
- Figge Art Museum:
  - Lasiren et la Bête
  - Capricorne
  - Croix Vaudou
  - Crucifix
  - Crucifixion
  - Femme légère
  - La Diablesse
  - Le Démon Ailé
  - Les Deux Sorcières
  - Les Trois Hermaphrodites
  - Rooster Mounting a Law
  - Turtle Woman
- Waterloo Center for the Arts:
  - Metamorphosis
  - Sun and Birds
  - Spirit Possession
  - La Siren
  - Papa Damballah and Aida Ouedo
  - Crucifixion
  - Crucifixion
  - Siren
  - Man and Horse
  - Woman and Bird
  - Bird and Horse
  - Angel and Bird
  - Male Figure
  - Merbird
  - Horse and Fish
  - Sirene
  - Mounted Figure
  - Sirene
  - Mother Angel and Child
- Haitian Studies Institute Archives and Special collections
  - Cor en Fer
  - Diable en Fer
