= Monta =

Monta is a given name which may refer to:

- Monta Bell (1891–1958), American film director
- Monta Ellis (born 1985), American basketball player
- Monta Mino (born 1944), Japanese television presenter
- Monta (Eyeshield 21), a fictional character in the Eyeshield 21 series

== See also ==
- Montas
