= Madsen Mompremier =

Haitian oil painter (born 1952)

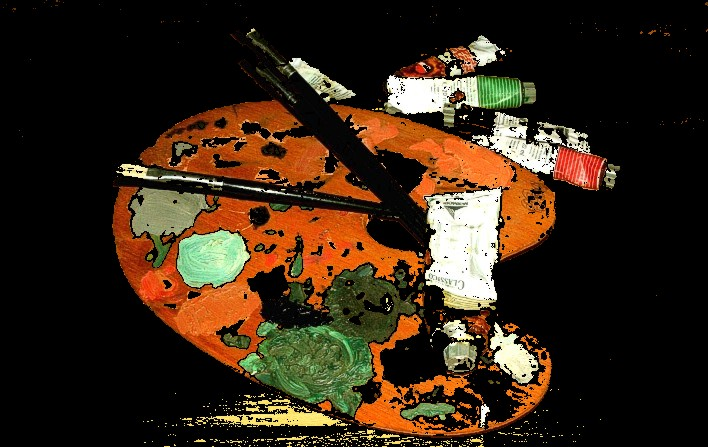

Madsen Mompremier (born 1952) is a Haitian oil painter, known for his depictions of Vodou gods (lwa).

== Biography ==
Mompremier was born in 1952 in Gonaives, Haiti. In 1972, he moved to Port-au-Prince to work as a tailor; just one year later, he began apprenticing under Gerard Valcin, pursuing interests in drawing and painting he had had since a young age. Originally, Mompremier painted images of daily life in Haiti. However, in 1975, he found his own means of expression in representing the Vodou lwa.. In 1978, Mompremier met his wife, Erzulie, who began painting under his direction; she passed in the earthquake of 2010. Mompremier is known worldwide for his art and, as such, has displayed his work internationally in Germany, France, and the United States.

== Principal exhibitions ==
- 2011 - Art and the Unbreakable Spirit of Haiti, Fowler Museum, Los Angeles, California, USA
- 2013 - Five Decades of Haitian Painting, University of Texas, Austin, Texas, USA
