= Prosper Pierre-Louis =

Haitian artist and painter

Prospère Pierre-Louis
- Born: October 12, 1947; Bainet, Haiti
- Died: November 1997 (aged 50)
- Occupation: Painter
- Known for: Saint Soleil art movement

"Loa", Prosper Pierre-Louis, 1989, Acrylic on Cardboard.

Prospère Pierre-Louis (October 12, 1947 – November 1997), also known as Prosper Pierre-Louis, was a Haitian artist, painter and one of the main contributors to the Saint Soleil art movement. His paintings depicting mystical Vodou lwa and spirits are especially noteworthy.

== Life ==
Pierre-Louis was born on October 12, 1947, in Bainet, near Jacmel, Haiti. He did not have any formal schooling but taught himself to play the drums and the violin. As a child, he assisted his father, a houngan, in preparing Haitian Vodou ceremonies. At the age of 16, he moved to Port-au-Prince. There, he took a number of odd jobs. Later, while working as a waiter at the home of Maud Robard, he joined the Saint Soleil commune organized by Robard and Jean-Claude Garoute, which united a variety of poor artists including singers, dancers, craftsmen, and painters into the movement. Pierre-Louis followed Robard to the community at Soisson-la-Montagne on the mountain above LaBoule and eventually became the most prominent painter in the group.

The Saint Soleil group disbanded in 1978, but five of the artists—Pierre-Louis, Levoy Exil, Denis Smith, Dieuseul Paul, and Louisiane Saint Fleurant—reorganized into the group "Cinq Soleils". After years of labor, Pierre-Louis's technique greatly evolved and he became a prominent and respected member of the local art community. His flourishing career came to an abrupt end when he died prematurely of an asthma attack in November 1997.

Paintings by Prospère Pierre-Louis have been sold by the Friends of HAS Haiti to raise funds for the Hôpital Albert Schweitzer Haiti in Deschapelles. Works by the artist are also part of the collection of Prince Olivier Doria d'Angri.
