= Sacha Thébaud =

Haitian artist

Sacha "Tebó" Thébaud (22 January 1934 – 26 May 2004) was a Haitian-American painter, sculptor, architect-engineer, furniture designer, urban planner, environmental reformer.

== Early years and education ==
Tebó was born in Port-au-Prince, Haiti into a family with deep ancestral roots dating to St. Domingue, when Haiti was France's wealthiest producing colony. His Polish military great-grandfather and ancestors of African descent fought for Haiti's Independence, and his Dutch grandfather moved to Cap Haitian from Suriname in the late 1800s. At the age of five, Sacha Thébaud began to dabble in drawing when his Dutch uncle brought him a box of wax crayons. At the age of ten he was exposed to Le Centre D'Art artists in Port-au-Prince prior to moving to Montreal, Canada with his family, upon his father's acceptance of an oral surgeon post. During his teen and young adult years, he painted and engraved the family's holiday cards in bronze and copper sheets, and painted a two-story mural at his family's Hôtel Castelhaïti. Later he delved in encaustics, a technique surviving thousands of years since Egyptian, Greek and Roman antiquity, in which bees wax was mixed with colored pigment powders encaustic painting). This difficult medium became his specialty.

He received his French Baccalaureate from Collège Stanislas de Montréal in 1953. In 1954, Sacha Thébaud began his studies in architectural engineering at the University of Haiti. In 1958, he received a scholarship from the French Government to further his studies in architecture at the École des Beaux-Arts in Paris. He accepted a position working in the architectural atelier of Bernard Zehrfuss, Marcel Breuer, and Pier Luigi Nervi on the CNIT (Centre des Nouvelles Industries et Technologies) building in Paris La Défense, a development project, and drew in his spare time. Here he met Le Corbusier, who offered him a position in December 1959, on what was to become the first planned city in India, named Chandigarh. He turned it down, and instead married Rona Roy in Dothan, Alabama and returned to Haiti to start his architectural practice, beginning with the construction of the tower at Hôtel Castelhaïti.

== Career ==
Tebó's contemporary, symbolic and figurative styles throughout his career bridged Pre-Columbian, Latin American, Afro-Caribbean, Postmodern American, and Contemporary European cultural influences. Like the rest of the Caribbean, Cuba, Haiti, the Dominican Republic, and the American Virgin Islands were all inhabited by the Arawaks / Taínos, Carib indigenous people, and Africans. Titles like "Anacaona", "Barouco", "Akoumbaya", "RaRa" "Afrodita" "Sirena" provide hints as to his cultural influences, as well as others relating to nature, the sea, and love. It was his desire to portray island life in the Caribbean, transcending time, and he depicted it throughout his painting and sculpture, contributing to the recognition of the Caribbean as an artistic region.

In his spare time from architecture, initially he painted in his self-styled contemporary technique at gallerist Issa El-Saieh's home, alongside naïf and contemporary Haitian artists, many of whom were founding members of Le Centre D'Art. He developed a friendship with many artists including St. Pierre Toussaint of Kenscoff, Haiti, whose art he collected.

In 1963, political instability prompted him to leave Haiti for Miami and St. Croix, U.S. Virgin Islands. He immersed himself in his architecture career and additionally supported himself and his growing family by painting and exhibiting in galleries from Ft. Lauderdale to Key West, and then to Christiansted and Charlotte Amalie. His art caught momentum and he was invited to participate alongside American artists Robert Rauschenberg, Jasper Johns, Larry Rivers and others, through the Instituto de Cultura Hispánica, in an traveling exhibit, entitled Arte de America y España, which toured Europe.

In 1972, he moved back to Haiti under improved political conditions, where he later developed a mountain village "Baron Bonheur" in Kenscoff, designed chairs including "La Dolce Vita" earning him patents, and continued painting and sculpting. In 1987, when Haiti was again in turmoil, he moved to Santiago de los Caballeros, in the Dominican Republic and immersed himself in the culture of the other half of the island of Hispaniola. At this point in his career, Tebó developed his own artistic codes and symbols. NYU's Chair of the Department of Art History and Latin American Art Scholar, Edward J. Sullivan, describes his work as "Hermetic Symbolism."

Tebó did not consider himself part of any "art school' or "art movement" although he was exposed to the works of Pablo Picasso, Joan Miró, Henri Matisse, Marc Chagall, and mid-century architectural philosophies influences while in France. He related his mystical experiences of Synchronicity to Sigmund Freud, Jiddu Krishnamurti, Carl Jung and others, which he read extensively, and the symbols in his art are meant to transcend both time and place.

His work has been exhibited throughout museums and galleries in North, Central & South America, Europe, and most frequently throughout the Caribbean islands, where he could island hop with an "exhibit in a box" (small canvasses inserted into larger ones, single to polyptych canvas panels) for ease of transit.

== Awards/Recognition ==
Tebó received the Best Foreign Artist award from the Dominican Association of Art Critics on behalf of UNESCO. Part of his philosophy was not to participate in juried art competitions, but to encourage and compliment fellow artists. He, along with artists Marie-José Nadal of Haiti and Paris, Myrna Guerrero and Danilo de los Santos of the Dominican Republic, received a collaborative grant from the Getty Foundation to research and write a book on the combined art of Haiti and the Dominican Republic. The survivors of this project anticipate the printing of the book in the near future.

One of the last group shows in which he participated, was for important artists originating from Haiti, and it brought him full circle to La Defense, « Haïti au toit de la Grande Arche», Paris, France, Septembre 1998.

Concerned for his fellow humanity and planet, he was active in reforestation in developing countries, beginning with Haiti and the Dominican Republic. In the mid 1970's he wrote an article in the Le Nouvelliste entitled "Haiti en L'An 2000" where he stressed the importance of infrastructure reform and environmental sensitivity amid population growth. He founded EkoSol Foundation, a non-profit organization focused on environmental solutions, hosting 'koumbits,' where he motivated communities to plant trees. He also allowed the public to participate in "Materia Viva" a museum installation making stoves using discarded tires, fueling them with fallen twigs instead of chopped trees used for firewood or charcoal. In this way, one actively experienced environmental conservation, an incentive appealing to the senses, as one smelled the aroma of a delicious meal being cooked and served from this stove.

== Usage specifics ==
Specific Art Medium: Encaustic (paint made of melted beeswax and metallic oxide powders.)

Subjects: Symbols and figures of Women, Horses, Kites, Boats, Turtles, Birds, Pelicans, Fish, Mermaids, Drums and Musical Instruments, Houses, Tropical Trees, the Sea, and Mardi Gras figures, Rhythm, Movement, and Colors.

Sculpture: copper, bronze, stainless steel, wood, and also acrylic color painted over metal. He presented symbolic and environment-oriented sculpture as museum installations.

Furniture: He developed and patented furniture designs focusing on chairs.

Koumbits Gatherings, in Haitian culture, where the participants work harmoniously alongside each other, often to the rhythms of drum or flute.

== Death and legacy ==
Tebó died 26 May 2004 in Santiago de los Caballeros, Dominican Republic to pancreatic cancer. He had four children with Rona Roy, a Haitian- American with whom he was married from 1959 to 1977. Spanish born Maria de Los Angeles Gracia Fernandez was his live-in companion from 1987-2004. He left a prolific body of work throughout the Caribbean region, establishing himself as a Contemporary Caribbean Master. Having studied Latin and traveled extensively, Tebó was fluent in at least six languages: French, Haitian Creole, English, Spanish, Portuguese, and Italian.

Tebó helped pave the way for Nicolas Dreux and influenced other younger contemporary Caribbean artists as they began to form an identity. He taught his draftsman Arijac (Harry Jacques), and eventually his framer and assistant, Osnel Saint Ral, the encaustic technique.
