= Henry-Robert Brésil =

Haitian painter

Henri-Robert Brésil (1952–1999) was a Haitian painter.

== Biography ==
Often referred to as simply "Brésil", Henri-Robert was born in Gonaïves, on September 19, 1952, and died in 1999.

He attended primary school at Frères de l'Institution Chrétienne, and finished his secondary school at Lycée Geffrard and the Centre d'Études - all located in Gonaïves. A poet and a musician, he began painting in 1973, before settling in Port-au-Prince sometime between 1973 and 1974.

In 1981, he received the ISPAN-UNESCO prize of honor at the Museum of Haitian Art at Collège Saint-Pierre. From then on, his reputation continued to grow. Subsequently, he began exhibiting in galleries in Haiti - such as Galerie Issa, Galerie Nader and Galerie Marassa - as well as in the United States, Puerto Rico, France, Italy, Switzerland and Japan.

A landscape painter, Brésil has received praise and recognition from the New York Times, the Miami Herald, and Hostess Magazine, among other publications.
