= Belkis Ramírez =

Dominican visual artist

Belkis Ramírez (1957–2019) was a Dominican contemporary visual artist mainly working in the mediums of printmaking (i.e., woodcut and wood engraving) and installation art. She was a member of the art collective, Colectivo Generación 80.

== Biography ==
Belkis Ramírez was born in 1957 in the province of Santiago Rodríguez, Dominican Republic. She studied at the Universidad Autónoma de Santo Domingo, graduating with a degree in Architecture and Graphic Design in 1986. She worked and lived in Santo Domingo until her death. She died on May 15, 2019.

Ramírez became known for her wood engraving; her woodcut drawings are often women. For a long time Ramírez was the only one to use the technique in the Dominican Republic. Because of her success, young local artists started to work with it. Her work was often considered political: human relations, the environment, and feminism are a common thread. She is said to have "radically transformed the language of printmaking. By introducing experimental techniques, [she] advanced new ways of discussing the body, power relations, architecture, patriarchal violence, and environmental issues."

She twice won First place in the Dominican Republic Biennial National Visual Arts Prize in Installation, in 1992 and 1994. Her artwork has also been used in books, including Julia Alvarez's A Cafecito Story and Angela Hernández's Edades de Asombro.

In a review of “Portables,” an exhibition by Ramírez in Santo Domingo, critic Laura Gil asserted that Ramírez's work is "among the most intelligent to be found in the context of contemporary Dominican art." With regard to the particular exhibit, Gil stated that "The show's true protagonist is the format itself, which is the artist's very aesthetic. In this aesthetic, the xylographic sheet changes from being an instrument in the service of the artwork's material formalization to being an intervened artistic object in itself that is halfway between relief, bulk sculpture, and "sculptopainting"."

Ramírez was a member of the Colectivo Generación 80, working with Jorge Pineda and Tony Catellan also members of Colectivo Generación 80. With their exhibition “Other Visions” (Casa de Francia, 1994) their first collaborative project they introduced contemporary and conceptual art in Santo Domingo. Their work was presented in Kassel Germany, Puerto Rico, Mexico, Peru, the USA, France, and Spain. In 2008 Belkis Ramírez and Jorge Pineda formed Quintapata Collective, adding next-generation artists Pascal Meccariello and Raquel Paiewonsky, with the desire to keep creating art projects that can maintain an open dialogue with both the local and international community. Her work is included in the collection of Pérez Art Museum Miami, Florida.
