= Peterson Laurent =

Haitian painter

Peterson Laurent (1888-1958) was a Haitian painter. Born in Saint-Marc, Laurent worked as a blacksmith. He typically painted scenes of rural life and United States battleships. Laurent died at about age 70 in Saint-Marc.
