= Vladimir Cybil Charlier =

American visual artist (born 1967)

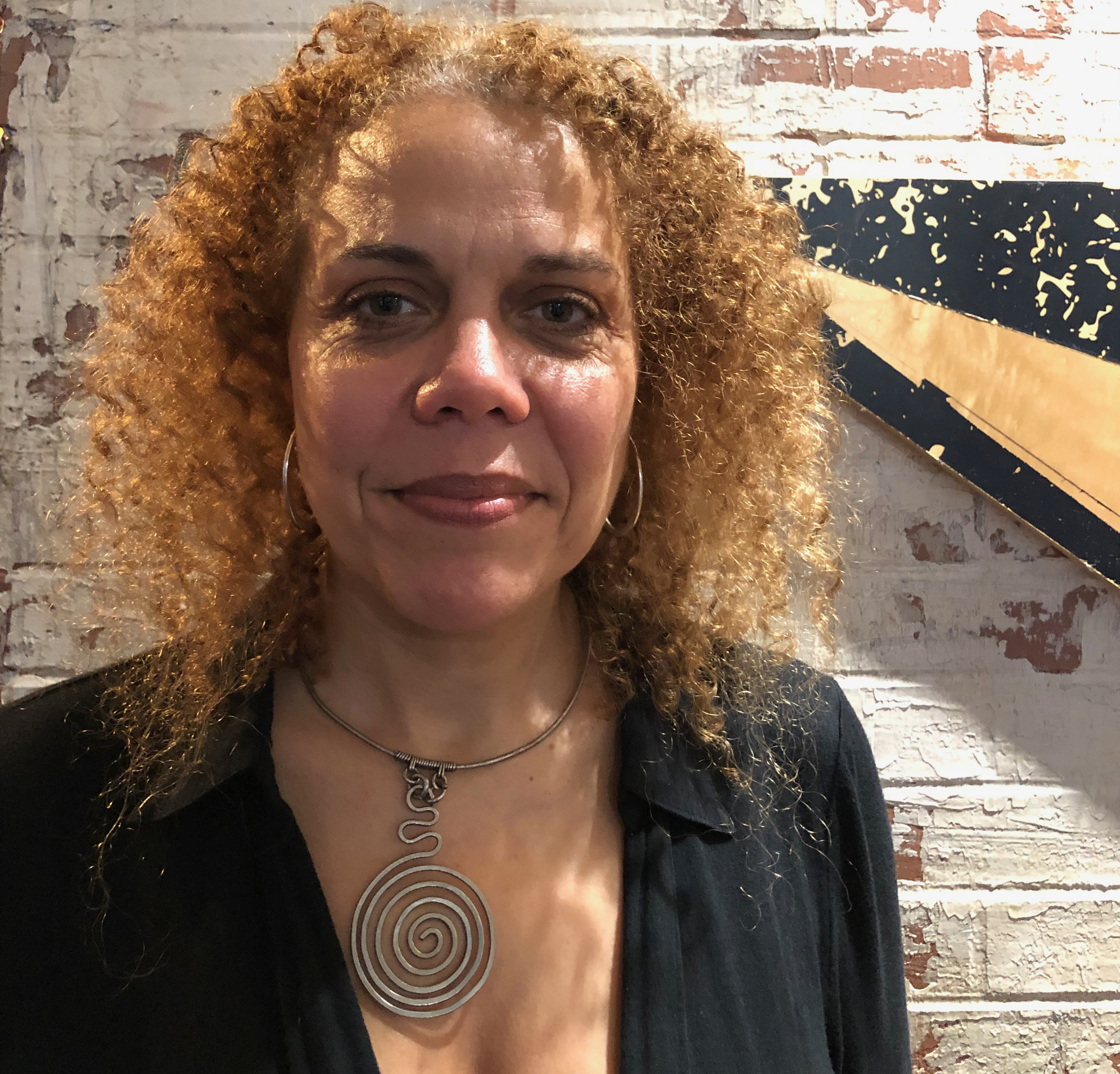
- Born: Vladimir Cybil Charlier; 1967 (age 58–59); New York, New York
- Education: BFA from Queens College, and MFA from the School of Visual Arts both of New York, New York
- Known for: Painting, Drawing, Installation, Sculpture, Video
- Website: www.vladimircybil.com

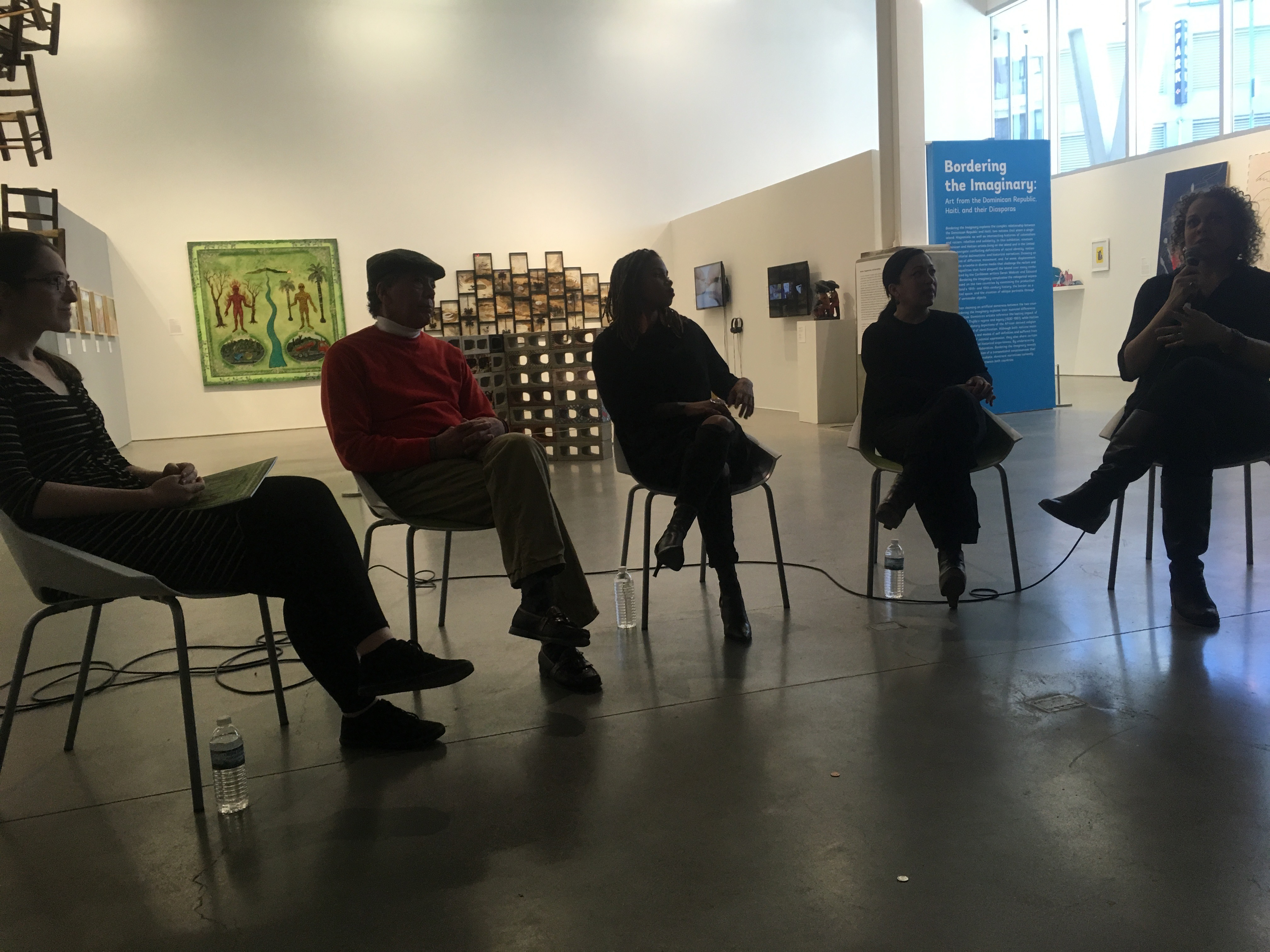
(discussion at Bric Gallery 2018) during the exhibition Bordering the Imagery: Art From The Dominican Republic, Haiti and Their Diasporas. Curator, Abigail Lapin Dardashti; and Artists: Freddy Rodriguez, Fabiola Jean-Louis, Scherezade Garcia and Vladimir Cybil Charlier

Vladimir Cybil Charlier (born 1967) is an American visual artist who lives and works in New York City. Her works reflect the complex dynamics linking two important geographic markers: The Caribbean and the United States. Her parents' migration into the United States allowed her to receive an education in fine arts and become a mix media artist. Her work includes paints, drawings, sculptures and others. Today she has a variety of work collections that have been displayed in numerous exhibitions within the United States and abroad.

== Education ==
Charlier received her BFA from Queens College in 1991 and her MFA from the School of Visual Arts in 1993. She was an artist in residence at the Skowhegan School of Painting and Sculpture (Summer 1993) and then at The Studio Museum in Harlem 1996-1997.

== Cultural background ==
Charlier was born in Elmhurst, Queens, New York City, to Haitian parents. She moved back and forth between the United States and Haiti in her childhood, attending both primary and secondary schools in Haiti and then spending her summers in New York. Within this context, she explores her "in-between-ness" in her art as it relates to these two different geographical and cultural points. This leads to her work relaying elements of identity and how others understand their own culture. Her work often incorporates religious, spiritual, and Afro-diasporic elements and symbols from these two cultures into a unified image.

== Selected works ==
- DESIRE, Johnny Was, 2018, FiveMyles Gallery. In the catalogue essay for the solo exhibition, Jerry Philogene quotes Audre Lorde, "Our visions begin with our desires." In this elaborate installation, Charlier reinvents a European boudoir, a quintessential feminine space, and one of female resistance and resilience. Flora and fauna that mimic a tropical garden embellish walls of a rose-colored space, lit atmospherically and enhanced with drawings on wood that represent personal gifts to the artist. Stencils of dark leafy vegetable greens adorn the floor. An ornate dresser displays drawers that have been lined with velvet embroidered with the romantic poetry, Rumi and Langston Hughes which the viewer is invited to open. Philogene concludes the intent as existing "to explore the relationship between language and material, between allegory and narration, asking how do desire, yearning, want, and need operate the historical process of cultural transformation that highlights diverse African diasporic experiences."
- Bordering the Imaginary: Art from the Dominican Republic, Haiti, and their Diasporas, a 2018 group exhibition at BRIC Gallery that visually explored issues of this specific Caribbean diaspora. Charlier's painting on wood, Soldats Marrons (Maroon Soldiers), mixes tiny 18th century soldiers with long white spears projecting into huge swarths of tropical foliage. As described in a catalogue essay by curator Abigail Lapin Dardashti, both Charlier's and Freddy Rodriguez's paintings "focus on the island's history of maroons - communities of runaway slaves that settled mountainous areas of the island," and reflect on the loss of history and amnesia of race due to Trujillo's "whitening" campaign. In the same exhibition is a collaborated installation by Charlier and Scherezade Garcia. Memories of a Utopian Island: Also at the BRIC exhibition Charlier presented a video animation Conversation Thread in collaboration with Sherezade Garcia. Two projected silhouettes of the artists tackle contemporary issues related to their island of origin that includes both Haiti and Dominican Republic. Speaking in a mixture of French, English and Spanish and Haitian Creole the silhouettes talk back and forth about an environment of equality and collaboration rather than one of friction. On another wall Borlette (Lottery) combines the sculptural inner tubes made of rice paper beaded to resemble Voodou flags, signature elements respectively of Garcia and Chavelier's individual practices.
- The Pantheon was started early in Charlier's career during a residency at the Studio Museum of Harlem. As if a cast of the Haitian laws had landed in Harlem, African American heroes/sheroes cloaked as traditional Catholic Saints invite the viewer to examine ideas about the construction of identity and the fluidity of a diasporic experience. This work shows modern African-American icons such as Harriet Tubman and Bob Marley as archetypes of African and Caribbean descent throughout a total of twenty-two art pieces in an effort to create a universal connection. Throughout these pieces of work, she uses visuals and symbols that are unbound to any culture or part of the world. Some of the titles include Zaka Du Bois, Ella Yamaja, and Ti Jimmy Danto.
- The Voodoo Child title is taken from Jimi Hendrix famous song, The Voodoo child series is an extended self-portrait, in which the artist reinvents the traditional machann (peddler) to travel through history and art history. The layering of both materials and imagery in these collages, often echo the early training of the artist as an oil painter.
- A Strange Bath, screen print and collage, comments on politics, underrepresentation, and tensions between countries Haiti and the Dominican Republic. Through this work, she also comments on the concept of repatriation and the struggles of the citizens of these two nations as a result of political decisions in these two governments.
- The Map and Requiem Portraits of prematurely deceased male relatives are enshrined as photographic sections of bodies placed in altar-like recessed niches. Beaded and sequined Voodoo flags allude to traditional craft, healing gestures and mark an embattled history.
- Time Life Jungle Echoing the tourist trade of the 1960s and 70's, black and white jungle-like flora and fauna wall drawings taken from childhood encyclopedias are confronted by rows of crayons installed as votive candles. Viewers were invited to symbolically color the installation that was presented at biennial de Santo Domingo as Paradise Lost.

== Solo exhibitions ==
- 2018 Desire, Johnny Was, FiveMyles Gallery, New York, New York
- 2009 Recasting Paradise, Skoto Gallery, New York, New York
- 2005 The Politics of Paradise, OGT Gallery, New York, New York
- 2000 Endezo, Galerie Bourbon-Lally, Pétion-Ville, Haiti, New York, New York
- 1997 Haiti nan/through/á travers Harlem, The Studio Museum of Harlem, New York, New York

== Collections, awards ==
Her work has been included in El Museo del Barrio and Exit Art, both in New York City; the Museum of Latin American Art, Long Beach, California; Centro Cultural de España, Santo Domingo; the Perez Art Museum Miami, Florida; and the Grand Palais, Paris. In 2003 she won the solo exhibition Prize at the Caribbean Biennial at Museo de Arte Moderno, Santo Domingo; and also participated in the Cuenca Biennial, Ecuador, and the Biennale di Venezia, Italy.
