= Raquel Paiewonsky =

Dominican artist

- Born: 1969 (age 56–57); Puerto Plata, Dominican Republic
- Education: Altos de Chavón School of Design; Parsons School of Design
- Known for: Painting, sculpture, photography, mixed media

Raquel Paiewonsky (born 1969) is an artist from the Dominican Republic.

== Early life and education ==
Born in Puerto Plata, Paiewonsky graduated in 1991 from the Altos de Chavón School of Design in La Romana. The following year she held her first solo exhibition at the Art Nouveau Gallery. She then traveled to New York City, where she lived and worked for a decade, studying at Parsons The New School for Design. After returning to the Dominican Republic she settled in Santo Domingo.

== Career ==
Stylistically, Paiewonsky produces art across a range of disciplines and media, including painting, sculpture, and photography. She has exhibited work in many venues both in the Dominican Republic and abroad, in solo and group shows, and has been included in the National Visual Arts Biennial of Santo Domingo on multiple occasions. She received the Gran Premio Eduardo León award for her work in 2006, 2008, and 2012. Among the collections featuring her work are the Daros-Latinoamérica, Zürich; the Rhode Island School of Design Museum, Rhode Island; Museum of Modern Art, Santo Domingo, Dominican Republic; and the Centro León, Santiago, Dominican Republic. She is also a co-founder of the art collective Quintipata, which includes Pascal Meccariello, Jorge Pineda, and Belkis Ramírez in its ranks. Paiewonsky had an exhibition of her mixed media work on breasts at the UMD Gallery in 2019.

Paiewonsky described how her work inquired into how changing cultural structures and stereotypes impacted human bodies and capacities for being.

== Personal life ==
Trained as a vegetarian chef as well as an artist, she is married with two sons. With her sister she owns a number of businesses in the Dominican Republic.
