= Julia Santos Solomon =

American artist

Julia Santos Solomon (born 1956) is a Dominican-American multi-media artist. Working in multiple genres—drawing, painting, sculpture, fashion design, landscape, mural, and illustration—she approaches art making with a sense of curiosity and a prayer for guidance. Her successful interdisciplinary body of work speaks to the full range of one woman's life experience coming out of the vibrant cultural heritage of the Caribbean.

Family roots, emigration to the United States, and most currently, work done in gold leaf to "re-appropriate" the precious metal taken from its source by conquering Europeans are themes that flow their way through her work. Rich Caribbean colors immerse the viewer in the artist's personal world while exposing her ongoing pursuit of identity as she connects the biographical to the universal, the geographical to the figurative, the past to the present.

Santos Solomon's lifelong friendship with the fashion illustrating team of Antonio Lopez and Juan Eugene Ramos (both from Puerto Rico) stood as a model for inspiring new generations of artists. This is particularly true for the contribution she made in the Dominican Republic at Altos de Chavon School of Design where she trained fashion industry professionals and produced shows for her young students.

The artist lives in Woodstock, New York, in a house once owned and occupied by sculptor Paul Feeney and print maker Rosella Hartman. She speculates that inhabiting a home built by a sculptor gave her the urge to work in a third dimension in a studio surrounded by forest and large enough to accommodate multiple projects at once.

== Early life ==
She was born in the Dominican Republic, and came to the United States at the age of 10, moving to New York City in 1966 to study art. She attended High School of Art and Design in New York City, Rhode Island School of Design, and Brown University.

== Career ==
Her work is in the permanent collections of the Hudson River Museum, Yonkers, New York, Leon-Litton Collection at the University Museum, Indiana University of Pennsylvania, Museum of Modern Art, Santo Domingo, Dominican Republic, and the Altos de Chavón Foundation, La Romana, Dominican Republic. She is archived at both the Dominican Studies Institute at City University in New York, and at the Smithsonian Archives of American Art in Washington, DC.

Her work has been discussed in several articles by Marianne de Tolentino, the art critic of the Listin Diario and featured in the New York Times, National Public Radio, State of the Arts, New Art International, Acrylic Revolution, the Art Times Journal and Acrylic Illuminations.

Santos Solomon was a founding member of Altos de Chavon School of Design of Parsons School of Design, through which her vision shaped generations of successful Dominican artists.

== List of Works ==
The following works are accessible through the artist's personal website.

- Artist's Palette Pool, New Zealand Collection
- Wind and Tenderness, Tropical Collection
- Painted Terracotta, Family Narrative Collection
- New Zealand Cliffs, Handmade Prints Collection
- Little Fish, Dreaming Series
