= Salnave Philippe-Auguste =

Salnave Philippe-Auguste (1908 - 1989) was a Haitian painter, lawyer, and magistrate known for his jungle scenes.

Philippe-Auguste's work was included in the travelling exhibition, "Haitian Art," organized by the Brooklyn Museum in 1978, which traveled to the Milwaukee Art Center (now the Milwaukee Art Museum), and the New Orleans Museum of Art. It was also included posthumously in 2020 in New York in “Saving Grace: A Celebration of Haitian Art” and covered in the New York Times. Philippe-Auguste was also the subject of a 2002 Danish documentary Drømmere (Dreamers).

== Early life and career ==
Salnave Philippe-Auguste was born in 1908 in Saint-Marc, Haiti. He was a self-taught lawyer and magistrate who wrote articles and poetry before he took up painting.

== Career ==
Philippe-Auguste embarked upon painting at 52 partly to support his children and joined the Centre d’Art in Port-au-Prince in December 1960. His jungle scenes reminiscent of the style of French artist Henri Rousseau sold well. Philippe-Auguste also painted in the same style, other scenes from nature, still lifes, fantastical creatures, carnivals, and human figures, especially women, posed against backgrounds of stylized flora and/or fauna.

Philippe-Auguste's work was included in the traveling exhibition, "Haitian Art," organized by the Brooklyn Museum in 1978, which traveled to the Milwaukee Art Center and the New Orleans Museum of Art. His painting Flamingoes was used to advertise it at the Brooklyn Museum.

=== Technique ===
Philippe-Auguste made preparatory drawings on tracing paper which he transferred to Masonite for his paintings. He also combined and re-used the drawings.

== Collections ==
Philippe-Auguste's work is in the Ben and Beatrice Goldstein Foundation, the Johnson Museum of Art at Cornell University, and the Huntington Museum of Art in West Virginia, among others. A copy of his Flamingos poster for the 1978 Haitian art exhibit is in the collections of the Library of Congress in Washington, D.C.

== Documentary ==
He was the subject of a 2002 Danish documentary about Haitian painters Drømmere (Dreamers).

== Personal life ==
Philippe-Auguste was married and had seven children. He died in Port-au-Prince on June 2, 1989.

== Bibliography ==
- Bihalji-Merin, Oto, Modern Primitives: Naïve Painting from the Late Seventeenth Century until the Present Day (New York: H. N. Abrams, 1961), p. 296
- Nadal-Gardère, Marie-José, La Peinture Haitienne: Nadal-Gardere M.J. & Bloncourt G. (Paris: Nathan, 1986), p. 103
- American Federation of Arts, Haitian Painting the Naïve Tradition, (catalogue of an exhibition selected by Pierre Apraxine, held at New York Cultural Center) p. 44
- Popular Paintings From Haiti from the collection of Kurt Bachmann (catalogue of an exhibition held at Arts Council Gallery, Cambridge, 2–23 November 1968 and at other locations in Britain through 17 May 1969), p. 18
- Stebich, Ute. A Haitian Celebration: Art and Culture (catalogue to Apr. 24-Aug. 16, 1992 exhibition) (Milwaukee: Milwaukee Art Museum, 1992)
- Williams, Sheldon, Voodoo and the Art of Haiti (London: Morland Lee Ltd., 1969), p. 77
