= Ersulie Mompremier =

Haitian artist

Ersulie Mompremier (alternate spellings Erzulie and Ersuille) is a Haitian artist. She is married to Madsen Mompremier and in 1978 began studying painting with him. Mompremier's artworks highlights daily Haitian life in direct contrast to her husband's compositions. Along with being a painter she is a community worker in Haiti.

== Public collections ==
2007 – two untitled artworks accepted to the Waterloo Center for the Arts, Waterloo, Iowa

(One artwork is in the Seattle Auction Gallery sold/owned? by Klein James)

== Paintings in museums ==
The Fruit Pickers Framed oil on masonite, The painting depicts two women in a lush landscape picking fruit. Signed lower left. Measures 9.75" x 7-5/8". Framed measurement 15" x 13.25".

Untitled Oil on masonite, "the painting depicts a crowd of people some being costumed in the midst of a Ra Ra celebration in front of 5 houses along with a person selling something in the foreground of the painting." Signed lower right. Measures 15.5" x 19.88". Framed Measurement 20" x 24.75".

Untitled Oil on masonite, "The painting depicts a crowd of people selling hot drinks, beans, fruit and cloth. There is a cane field in the background." Signed lower right. Measures 15.88" x 24". Framed Measurement 20.875" x 28.625".
