= Galland Semerand =

Haitian artist (1953–2019

- Born: 4 September 1953; Cap-Haïtien, Haiti
- Died: 29 November 2019 (aged 66); Croix-des-Bouquets, Haiti
- Occupations: Painter; Architect

Galland Semerand (4 September 1953 – 29 November 2019) was a Haitian painter and architect.

Semerand created an atmosphere of pomp and grandeur, expressed in his painting of Citadelle Laferrière and Sans-Souci Palace.

== Biography ==
Born on 4 September 1953 in Cap-Haïtien, Semerand grew up in Port-au-Prince. He spent a year at the Académie des Beaux-Arts in France, but was largely self-taught. He was very attracted to the "Gingerbread" house movement that was prevalent in the late 19th and early 20th Centuries. However, he created and sold most of his artwork from home.

In 1984, Semerand's talent was discovered during Pope John Paul II's visit to Haiti. The following year, he had a major exhibition in Paris. He won a prize in 1992 with a painting titled "La découverte d'Haïti par Christophe Colomb", which was published in the German magazine Stern. In the early 1990s Semerand presented numerous exhibitions in Haiti and Florida. In 1997, he won a prize in art from the communications company TELECO, Inc.

Semerand's artwork would be printed on Haitian stamps. Many of these works are now in exhibition at Expressions Art Gallery.

The 2010 Haiti Earthquake caused much inspiration for Semerand and he published many triptych-style works.

Some of Semerand's paintings bear a resemblance to Jean-Antoine Watteau's works and Dutch Golden Age painting.
