= Jacqueline Nesti Joseph =

Haitian artist

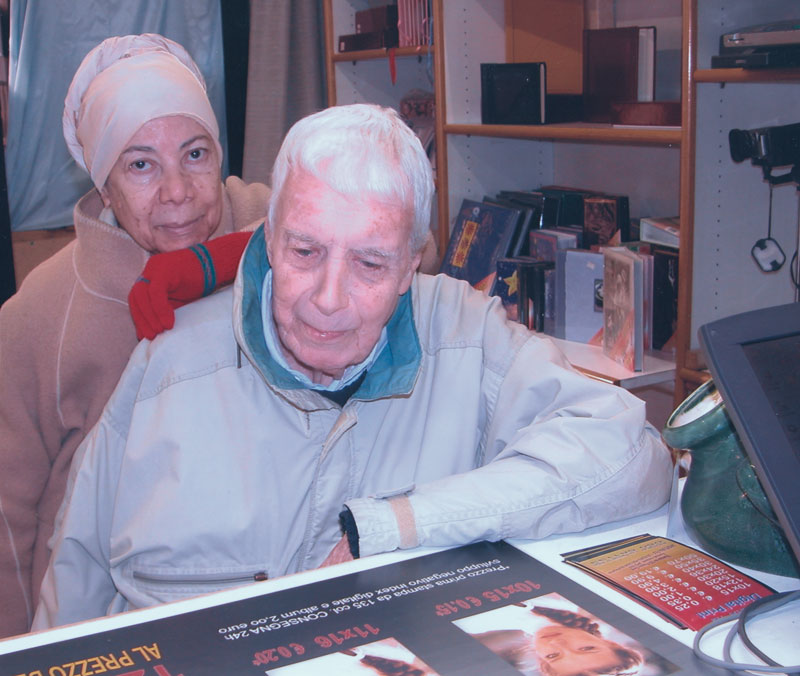
- Joseph with her husband, Victor
- Born: 1932 (age 93–94); Port-au-Prince, Haiti
- Education: Diego Rivera
- Known for: Painting

Jacqueline Nesti Joseph (born 1932) is a Haitian painter from Port-au-Prince. During a career of over 50 years, Joseph has had exhibitions all over the world, including at the Solomon R. Guggenheim Museum in New York [1].

== Biography ==
At a very young age Joseph moved to Paris to finish her studies. Thanks to the teachings of Claude Perset and a pupil of Georges Braque, she settled in France. At the home of the artist Manfredo Borsi, she met André Verdet, the poet Jacques Prévert and artists such as Picasso, Chagall, and Magnelli. In 1955 she travelled to Mexico and was introduced to Diego Rivera, who became her mentor and friend. Her return to Haiti inspired her intense work of painting where her homeland and surrounding landscapes are depicted in her work.

Returning to Europe, she met and married Victor Nesti, and the couple became inseparable until his death in 2008. Victor Nesti was born in Soho, London, and was an artist in his own right. After working as a chef at the Hotel Carlton, he studied at the Academy of Belle Arti under Ottone Rosai. He had a number of personal exhibitions and listed viewings in galleries and museums worldwide.

Jacqueline Joseph made Pisa her home in 1972, and the couple continued to pursue their artistic talents—Jacqueline through her memories of thematic Haitian topics including market scenes, Haiti Carnival, exotic flowers, etc., and her husband Victor in his interpretation of geometric designs and in describing culinary treats through art. As a result of the latter, a graphical recipe book was produced in 2003 called “A tavola… con I Pisani più schietti,” supported by the Province of Pisa and created by Alberto Marianelli, Alessandro Moretto, and Valeria Caldelli.

== Who's Written About Her ==
Pietro Barsi, Furio Bartorelli, Marziano Bernardi, Paolo Bernardini, Piero Studiati Berni, Gerald Bloncourt, Vittorio Bottini, Dino Buzzati, Gaetana Cali, Giorgio Casini, Dino Carlesi, Luigi Carluccio, Remi De Cnodder, Lella Durando, Albino Galvano, Gabriele Mandel, George Mary, Adele Menzio, Nicola Micieli, Marie-Jose Nadal-Gardere, Romolo Nazzaro, Giuseppe Pelloni, Orazio Pettinelli, Francesco Prestipino, Jacques Prévert, Carlo Ludovico Ragghianti, Aurelio Ragionieri, Diego Rivera, Lorenzo Scateni, Giuseppina Scotti Porcelli, Luigi Servolini, Grazia A. Tadolini, Almerico Tomaselli, Silvia Taricco, and André Verdet.

Diego Rivera: “To Jacqueline Joseph, a beautiful, talented artist, whom I had the pleasure to get to know and watch her at work. I would love to have been able to keep her here with me and watch her grow like a very delicate and pretty stalk who blossoms into a stunning, rare flower.”

Dino Buzzati: “The majority of Jacqueline's paintings depict scenes and figures of Haiti, groups of women at the market and multitudes of flowers. She captures an illuminating glow of her subjects demonstrated in her best canvases”
