= Edith Hollant =

Haitian photographer and painter

Edith Hollant (born 1938) is a Haitian photographer and painter. Hailing from Port-au-Prince, Hollant first exhibited her works in 1955. She has since exhibited in New York City.
