= Seymour Etienne Bottex =

Haitian painter (1922-2016)

Seymour Bottex
- Born: Seymour Etienne Bottex; December 24, 1920 (or 1922); Port-Margot, Haiti
- Died: May 16, 2016
- Known for: Painting
- Style: Naïve
- Movement: L'École du Cap-Haitien

Seymour Etienne Bottex (December 24, 1920 - May16, 2016) was a Haitian painter.

== Biography ==
Born in Port-Margot, in northern Haiti, Seymour and his brother Jean-Baptise are descendants of the Haitian Generals of the Independence of the North - Raimond de Bottex, and his son Narcéus Bottex (18th and 19th centuries).

Seymour worked as a photographer until 1955 when his older brother Jean-Baptiste encouraged him to begin painting. He joined the Centre d'Art in 1961, and the Galerie Issa in Port-au-Prince in 1969.

In the 1980s, he moved to the United States, but kept working for the Galerie Issa until the death of its founder, Issa El-Saieh, in 2005.

His paintings, mingling humorous, historical, and biblical themes, are exhibited worldwide and often auctioned at Sotheby's in New York. He is considered one of the finest Haitian naïf painters, and his murals in the Episcopal Cathedral de Sainte Trinité in Port-au-Prince are considered the most important achievement in Haitian modern art.

Paintings by Seymour Etienne Bottex have been sold by the Friends of HAS Haiti to raise funds for the Hôpital Albert Schweitzer Haiti, located in Deschapelles.

According to an invitation to benefit Eye Care from the Embassy of Haiti issued Sunday Oct 16, 1994, "Seymour Etienne Bottex was born in 1920 near Cap-Haïtien. Bottex began painting in 1955 and was encouraged to paint by his brother, Jean-Baptiste, already a well-known artist. Bottex scenes are often colorful. Humorous themes are sometimes represented in his work. His paintings have been exhibited in the United States, England, France and Italy..."
