= Louisiane Saint Fleurant =

Haitian artist and painter

- Born: 11 September 1924; Petit-Trou-de-Nippes, Haiti
- Died: 1 June 2005 (aged 80)
- Occupation: Painter
- Known for: Saint Soleil Art movement

Louisiane Saint Fleurant (11 September 1924 – 1 June 2005) was a Haitian female artist and painter. She was a founder of the peasant Saint Soleil art movement.

Saint Fleurant's paintings often depict maternal scenes of females, children, trees, wildlife, and Haitian Vodou Loas. Her folk painting style is often colorful and vibrant and expresses a distinct female perspective on the Saint Soleil movement and Haitian Vodou art.

== Biography ==
Louisiane Saint Fleurant was born on 11 September 1924, in Petit-Trou-de-Nippes, Haiti. She was not formally trained in art and began painting only in her late 40s.

In her fifties, Louisiane Saint Fleurant took a job as a cook for the Saint Soleil Group when she came to Soissons La Montagne. Here, she was discovered painting small pictures in her room by her employer, Maude Robbart. Along with Prospere Pierre-Louis, Dieuseul Paul, Denis Smith, and Levoy Exil, she formed the renowned Cinq Soleil (Five Suns) art movement. The Five Suns group formed out of the Saint Soleil movement, of which Saint Fleurant was the oldest and only female artist. In 1974, she joined Poisson Soleil, initiated by Tiga and Maude Guerdes Robart, in an inaugural exhibition at the Museum of Haitian Art. Saint Fleurant was originally introduced to the Saint Soleil art community as a peasant cook and after receiving some direction from Jean-Claude Garoute, she started her practice in painting and sculpture.

In 1965 she moved to Petion-Ville where she had a tiny shop of her own selling her work and that of her two sons, Ramphis and the late Stivenson Magloire. Aliciane Magloire (ceramic potter) and Magda Magloire (painter) were two of her daughters (she had a fifth child of which little information is unknown). Saint Fleurant painted and sculpted for 30 years until the age of 80 when poor vision precluded her ability to continue in 2002. Saint Fleurant died in her home on 1 June 2005.

A second tragedy hit her family when the cemetery where she was buried was bulldozed following the 2010 Haiti earthquake to allow a bus station to be built.

Her work has been exhibited in Asia, Europe, and the United States and has recently been part of fundraising, relief, and awareness efforts following the 2010 Haiti earthquake. March 2007 the French Institute of Haiti paid her a posthumous tribute. Saint Fleurant's folk paintings are well regarded by collectors for their unique manifestations of motherhood and her female perspective on Haitian and Vodou folk art. Characteristic of her paintings are flat pictures with a lack of linear perspective typically in crowded spaces. Women, children, houses, birds and animals are her preferred topics. She also sold her ceramic sculptures that showed her sense of humor, for example putting bird heads on human bodies.

== Public collections ==
- Waterloo Center for the Arts
- 27–29 May 2004, the AfricAmericA Cultural Center presented "Generations/Genres", an exhibition which brought together the work of three female visual artists: Louisiane Saint-Fleurant, Valérie Christelle Saint-Pierre, and Barbara Prézeau

== Bibliography ==
- Barbara Prézeau-Stephenson, Rachel Douglas, "Contemporary Art as Cultural Product in the Context of Haiti", Small Axe, Number 27 (Volume 12, Number October 2008, pp. 94–104 (Article).
- http://www.haiticulture.ch/Louisianne_Saint-Fleurant.html (accessed March 2018).
- Consentino, Donald J. In Extremis, Death and Life in 21st-Century Haitian Art, Los Angeles, CA: Regents of University of California 2012.
- Rodman, Selden. Where Art is Joy, Haitian Art: The First Forty Years. New York, NY: Ruggles de Latour, Inc., 1988.
- Russell, Candice. Masterpieces of Haitian Art, Seven Decades of Unique Visual Heritage, Atglen, PA 2013.
