= Jean-Claude Garoute =

Haitian painter and sculptor (1935–2006)

- Born: December 9, 1935; Jérémie, Haiti
- Died: December 14, 2006 (aged 71)
- Occupation: Painter
- Known for: Saint Soleil Art movement

Jean-Claude "Tiga" Garoute (December 9, 1935 – December 14, 2006) was a Haitian painter and sculptor. Born in Jérémie, Garoute co-founded a museum of ceramic art in Haiti named Poto-Mitan. An abstract painter, he participated in art festivals throughout the world.

Tiga and Maud Guerdes Robard founded the Saint-Soleil post-naïve school of Haitian painting. The school was born when they offered farmers in Soisson-La-Montagne, a rural area near Port-au-Prince, drawing and painting materials. Out of the movement came such painters as Levoy Exil, Louisiane Saint Fleurant, St-Jean, and Dieuseul Paul to name a few. The movement drew the eye of French author André Malraux who dedicated a chapter to it in his book L'Intemporel.

In the late 1980s, Tiga also created Kaytiga, a gallery and cultural center where he taught children and adults art through his Rotation Artistique (Artistic Rotation) method. The method consisted of letting pupils roam freely from clay to drums to paint to ink. Kaytiga had various addresses in Pétion-Ville, a suburb of Port-au-Prince, over the years and eventually moved to Delmas, another suburb of Port-au-Prince.

In his own paintings, Tiga often used his "Solèy Brulé" method, a combination of ink and acid.

Tiga died in December 2006 in Florida after suffering from cancer. Haiti's February 2007 carnival was dedicated to him and embraced the theme Solèy Leve (Risen Sun) to evoke the Saint-Soleil movement he co-created.

Some of the alumni of Poto-Mitan include Haitian painters Philippe Dodard and Occenad. Brooklyn-based singer Riva Nyri Précil is an alumna of Kaytiga. The german-haitian Rapper Frederik Torch Hahn was also a student of Kaytiga.

== Personal life ==
Tiga married a Haitian woman in his 20s, whom he later divorced and with whom he had several children including the artist photographer Pascale (Kafé) Garoute and Michele Garoute,"Klode” who is an artiste painter herself and promotes the "Soley Brulé" and "Artistic Rotation" methods and teachings.
