= Marcos Leonel Posadas =

Mexican politician

Marcos Leonel Posadas Segura (born October 8, 1938, Tampico) is a Mexican politician. Leonel Posadas joined the Mexican Communist Party in April 1956. He became an electrician in the petroleum sector by profession. In 1964 he was included in the Central Committee of the party. The following year he became the general secretary of the Mexican Communist Youth, a position he occupied until 1970. Between 1973 and 1978 he was the director of the official Communist Party newspaper Oposición. In 1979 he became a member of the Executive Committee of the Communist Party.

Posadas became a co-founder of the United Socialist Party of Mexico (PSUM). In PSUM he was responsible for Organization and International Affairs. He later became co-founder of the Mexican Socialist Party (PMS) and the Party of the Democratic Revolution (PRD).
