= Gerard Valcin =

Gerard Valcin (1923-1988) was a self taught, Haitian painter who is known most commonly for his work depicting Haitian Vodou rituals and the labors of everyday Haitian life.

== Biography ==
Gerard Valcin was born in 1923 in Haiti into a very poor family and his parents couldn't pay for him to receive an education. He was in school for only 3 years until he quit to make money weaving twine for hats as a young boy. He only earned two cents for every three yards of wine he weaved; he then worked as a tile setter for twelve years. "Profits from the tile work allowed me to paint." – Gerard Valcin.

Valcin received no formal training in painting of any art form. However, as a young boy, Valcin would watch a man in his neighborhood paint Vodou Spirits on pieces of cardboard in his front yard. The paint was made from limes, eggs, bark and homemade rum. After seeing this, he started painting himself with similar homemade paints. He began painting from his spiritual imagination – influenced by country life and the blending of Vodou and Masonic Masonry. However, most of his work comes from the inspiration of Vodou Spirits, beliefs, and ceremonies. While working as a tile setter, he met a group of painters who were using real, store bought, paints. "I saw them pressing a tube. I didn't know what it was. I thought it was toothpaste." – Gerard Valcin.

In 1947, Valcin brought one of his paintings to the Centre d'Arte in Port-au-Prince. Dwight Peters, the director of the Centre d'Arte, was scouting just such untrained artists and wanted to nurture their work. In 1950, Valcin official started the Centre d'Arte. Peters provided Valcin, and other such artists, with supplies and space to exhibit and sell their work. Gerard Valcin died in 1988. He was an important figure in the second generation of Haitian painters. "Painting, rum, music, work, and nothing else." – Gerard Valcin.

His half-brother Pierre-Joseph Valcin was also a painter. Also his nephew Favrange Valcin, Valcin II, was one.

== Principal exhibitions and works ==
- Papa Zaca (1969)
- Coumbite (1971)
- Mermaids in the Living Room, Vodou Cascade (Saut d’Eau), Ra Ra Parade: Waterloo Center for the Arts
- Loge Bleu: Milwaukee Art Museum (1972)
- Agoue and La Sirene: Nottingham Contemporary
