= Jean-René Jérôme =

Haitian artist (1942–1991)

Jean-René Jérôme (1942–1991) was a Haitian painter and considered one of Haiti's greatest artists. Born in Petit-Goâve on March 17, 1942, Jean-René Jérôme moved to Port-Au-Prince where he attended the "Petit Séminaire Collège St-Martial" and later the "Collège Moderne”. His family is a part of the elite of Haitian society, which enabled him to engage in a variety of artistic activities that interested him such as dance, theatre, drawing, voice and painting. He was able to study drawing and painting at the School of Fine Arts.

In 1965, he won first prize at the Esso Salon Competition. He later decided to devote himself entirely to painting and opened a studio in Port-Au-Prince in 1968. Jérôme is best known for the originality of his paintings, particularly those of nude females. He was awarded an art scholarship by the US government in 1970 and stayed for four months, studying and working with Bernard Séjourne. In 1973 he returned to Haiti and taught at the School of Fine Arts. He founded the School of Beauty with Bernard Séjourne, Jean-Claude Legagneur and Philippe Dodard.

In 1985, he founded the "Ateliers Jérôme" where his own paintings and other artist's works are exhibited. His artwork has been exhibited in countries such as Canada, Brazil, Senegal, United States, Martinique, Latin America, Dominican Republic, Europe and Haiti. Jean-René Jérôme died in 1991. Illustrations of his painting can be seen in Selden Rodman’s book “Where Art is Joy”, Eva Pataki’s book, “Haitian Painting” and Gerald Alexis’ book, “Peintres Haïtiens”.
