= Lionel =

Lionel may refer to:

== Name and mononyms ==
- Lionel (given name)
- Lionel (artist), anonymous street artist based in Guelph, Ontario
- Lionel (radio personality), American syndicated radio, television and YouTube legal and media analyst

== Places ==
- Lionel, Lewis, a village in the Outer Hebrides of Scotland
- Lionel Town, Jamaica, a settlement

== Brands and enterprises ==
- Lionel, LLC, an American designer and importer of toy trains and model railroads, which owns the trademarks and most of the product rights associated with Lionel Corp., but is not directly related
- Lionel Corporation, an American manufacturer and retailer of model trains and model railroads, both scale and semiscale

== Other uses ==
- Lionel (bridge), a defense in the game of bridge
- Lionel (Arthurian legend), a character in the cyclical prose tradition of the Arthurian legend
- Lionel (film), a 2025 road drama film
