= Sergine André =

Haitian-Belgian artist

Sergine Andre
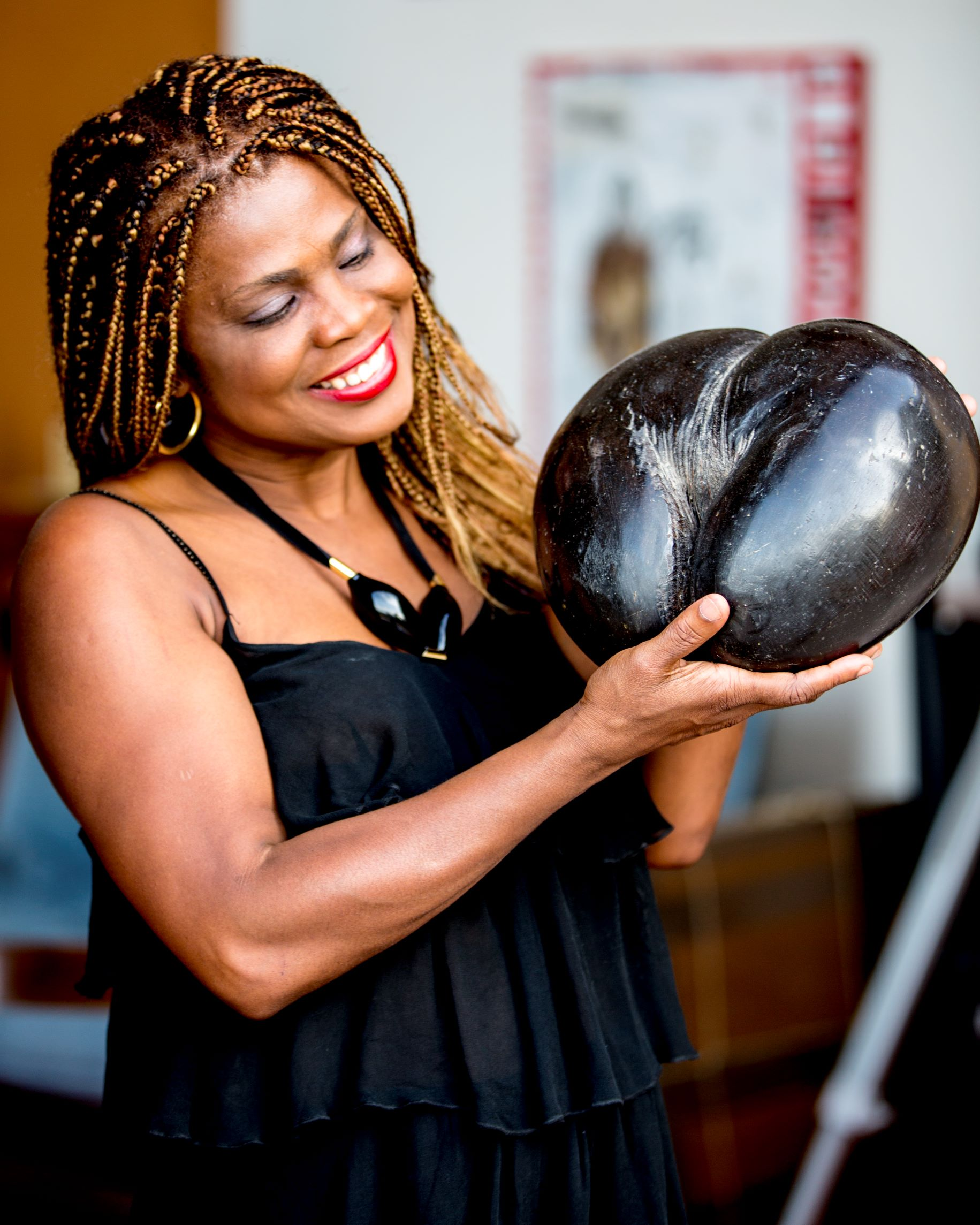
- Born: Verrettes, Haiti
- Style: Contemporary art
- Website: http://sergineandre.org

Sergine Andre (‘Djinn’), born in the Artibonite region of Haiti, is an artist who has lived and worked in Brussels since 2010.

== Biography ==
Following technical art training at the Ottawa School of Art in 1997, she won a prize with the Institut Français and the opportunity to work at the National School of Fine Arts in Paris as a guest artist. In 2006, she participated at the Johannesburg Bag Factory in South Africa (as guest artist) and in 2011 at the 54th Venice Biennale.

Her work has been exhibited in North America (including New York, Miami, Pittsburgh, Saint Augustine, Montreal and Washington DC), the Caribbean (Haiti, Martinique, Dominican Republic), various cities in Europe (including Paris, Berlin, Venice, Brussels, Warsaw, Lyon, Luxembourg) as well as in Johannesbourg, South Africa.

== Exhibitions ==
- 2024: Celebration of 150 years of the historic Mommens Studios', Sergine André, Open door (exhibition curator). Mommens Studios, Brussels, Belgium
- 2024: Butterfly Resistance: Haiti, Galeria Studio, Palace of Culture and Science, Warsaw, Poland
- 2024: 'Sergine André: a Space to Create, Galerie Monnin (online).
- 2022: World Atlantic Art Fair 2022, Galerie Monnin, Port-au-Prince, Haiti / Miami, United States
- 2022: 'Vives' Collective exhibition, Maison Dufort, Centre d'Art and the Museum of Haitian Art, Port-au-Princes, Haiti
- 2021:'Rara' Solo exhibition, Centre for Fine Arts, Brussels (BOZAR), in association with Camarote, Belgium
- 2021: World Atlantic Fair 2021, Galerie Monnin
- 2020: Solo exhibition, Balthasar Brussels, Belgium
- 2020: "Les Rencontres Transfrontalières Francophones". Solo exhibition, Hôtel de Ville de Saint-Louis, France
- 2020: "Map Danse Anba Lapli", collective exhibition. Galerie de la Rage. Lyon, and Studio Bossiere, Montreuil Paris, France
- 2019: "L’amitié dans la Diversité d’Horizon et de Culture II", curator of collective exhibition. Private show, Brussels, Belgium
- 2019: "Commemoration de la Bataille de Vertières", Embassy of Haiti to the Benelux countries, Brussels, Belgium
- 2019: ″Exposicion Colectiva: Celebracion para Maryse Conde″ (curated by Delia Blanco) Embajada de Francia, Santo Domingo, Republica Dominicana
- 2017: « L’amitié dans la diversité d’horizon et de culture », Ateliers Mommen, Brussels, Belgium
- 2015: « Célébration des mondes sensibles, 141 ans de la cité », Ateliers Mommen, Brussels, Belgium
- 2014: « Regards sur la peinture haïtienne », Abbaye de Neumünster, Luxembourg, Grand Duchy of Luxembourg
- 2013: « Haiti Royaume de ce monde », Institut Français, Jacmel, Haïti
- 2012: EU Open Days Art Exhibition '10 days, 10 artists'. European Commission, Brussels [Belgium]
- 2012: « Haiti, un futur pour son passé », Palais des beaux-arts de Liège, Liège Belgium
- 2012: Centre Culturel de Rencontre Fonds Saint-Jacques, Martinique
- 2011: Global Caribbean III, Art Basel, Miami, United States
- 2011: 6th Annual Haitian Art Exhibit, Casa de Campo, Dominican Republic
- 2011: 54th Venice Biennale, Haiti Pavilion, Venice, Italy
- 2011: Galerie 16, Yverdon-les-Bains, Switzerland
- 2011: "Haïti Royaume de ce Monde", agnès b., Paris, France
- 2011: "Haïti l'art contre l'oubli", Centre Culturel du Lièvre d'Or, Dreux, France
- 2010: 'The Truth', collective exhibition, (collaboration with Galerie Monnin and Donna Karen), Stephan Weiss Studios, West Village, New York City
- 2010: "Femmes en mythologie, mythologie de femmes", Musée du Montparnasse, Paris, France
- 2009: "Make Art like Voodoo", Patchworldverlag, Berlin, Germany
- 2009: "Dialogue 1: Haïti Art Now", Santo Domingo, Dominican Republic
- 2009: Galerie 16, Yverdon-les-Bains, Switzerland
- 2009: "Courant chaud", Musée du Panthéon National Haïtien, Port-au-Prince, Haiti
- 2008: "Cultur'Elle" Institut français, Port-au-Prince, Haiti
- 2007: Private Show, Casa de Campo, Republica Dominicana
- 2007: Private Show, Residence of US Ambassador to Haiti, Washington DC, United States
- 2006: Bag Factory Artists Studio (guest artist), Johannesburg, South Africa
- 2006: "Méandres de la mémoire", Salle Tohu, Montreal, Canada
- 2005: "Haitian Experience", Absolute Americana Art Gallery, St. Augustine, Florida, United States
- 2004: "Kafou" Institut français, Port-au-Prince, Haiti
- 2004: "Femmes en production II", Port-au-Prince, Haiti
- 2004: FONDAM, Haitian art sale and celebration, Washington DC, United States
- 2004: "Three Women Show", Galerie Monnin, Pétion-Ville, Haiti
- 2003: Atelier Eko, Pétion-Ville, Haiti
- 2003: Alliance Française, Jacmel, Haiti
- 2002: "Haitian art show", Friends of Hôpital Albert Schweitzer Haiti, Pittsburgh, Pennsylvania, United States
- 2002: "Haitian Art in Bloom", New York, United States
- 2002: "Quand passent les chevaux", Galerie Monnin, Pétion-Ville, Haiti
- 2001: Ethno Galerie, Pétion-Ville, Haiti
- 2000: "Héritage de Couleurs", Ethno Galerie, Pétion-Ville, Haiti
- 2000: "Trio - Sergine Andre, Barbara Cardone, Pascale Monnin, Galerie Monnin, Pétion-Ville, Haiti
- 2000: "Haïti: Anges and Démons", Halle Saint Pierre, Paris, France
- 1998: Paginkob association, Brussels, Belgium
- 1997: "Les femmes peintres d'Haïti", Musée du Panthéon National Haïtien, Port-au-Prince, Haiti
- 1996: "L'invisible", Sergine Andre and Pascale Monnin, Galerie Monnin, Pétion-Ville, Haiti

== Prizes and awards ==
- 2006: Guest Artist, Bag Factory, Johannesburg, South Africa
- 1998: Guest Artist, École nationale supérieure des Beaux-Arts, Paris, France
- 1997: Grand Prize of the Institut français, "Connaître les jeunes peintres"

== Videos ==
- Sergine André, entre chaos et cosmos, Portrait/Interview with Sergine Andre, Haiti Inter, 2022
- 'Intranquillement Votre', Interview with Sergine Andre 08 Sergine 02 James Noel / Maksaens Denis, 2016
- Ayiti directed by Laurence Magloire
- France 2: Culture Monde
- France 3: 'Haiti, Royaume de ce Monde' Haïti, Royaume de ce monde, une exposition à la Fondation Agnès B

== Publications ==
- Creation Plastique d'Haiti (a history of visual arts in Haiti), Carlo A. Celius, Editions de la Maison des Sciences de l'Homme, Paris, 2023
- Artist's Monograph One Voice Dialogue (Dialogue a une Voix), Sergine Andre, CIDIHCA Editions, Montreal, 2022, 2nd Ed, CIDICHA France, 2023.
- Cover illustration for 'Casseus!' album by Fareed Haque, (Rara Artibonite painting), Fareed Haque, Wahdude Music, Chicago, 2023
- Art review "IntranQu'illites" 5th edition on Eros (as Artistic Director), Ed. Passagers des Ventes, Paris, France, 2020
- UNESCO Courier 'Welcome to the Anthropocene' (April–June 2018), UNESCO Publications, Paris, France, 2018.
- Thomas C. Spear, 'Lettre à Sergine', in "Le Serpent à plumes pour Haïti", Ed. Le Serpent à Plumes, Paris, France, 2010
- "Haïti:avant l'orage", Frankettiene and Olivier Beytout, Éditions Riveneuve, Paris, France, 2010.
- "Saisir l’âme de Haïti : Sergine André", Le Courrier ACP-EU, Brussels, January/February 2008
- "Sergine André et l'Atelier Eko", Dieuvela Etienne, Le Nouvelliste, Haïti, 2003
- "L'Art de Sergine André", Jobnel Pierre
- "Sergine André au-delà des sens", Gary Victor, Le Matin, Haïti
- "Haïti anges et démons", Ed. Hoëbeke / La Halle Saint Pierre, Paris, 2000
- ″'Titouan en Haiti'″. Editions Gallimard, Paris, 2003
- "Carnets de Voyage II", Titouan Lamazou (fr), Ed. Gallimard, Paris, 2000,
- Cover illustrations of works by Gary Victor: "A l'Angle des Rues Parallèles" (2003) et "Le Diable dans une Tasse de Thé à la Citronelle" (2005). Ed. Vents d'ailleur, France
- Connaître les jeunes peintres, 1997
