= Jean-Baptiste Bottex =

Haitian painter

- Born: June 24, 1918; Port-Margot, Haiti
- Died: April 28, 1979 (aged 60)
- Known for: painting
- Style: naïve
- Movement: L'École du Cap-Haïtien

Jean-Baptiste Bottex (June 24, 1918 – May 28, 1979) was a Haitian painter.

== Biography ==
Hailing from Port Margot, near Cap-Haitien in northern Haiti, Jean-Baptiste and his younger brother Seymour are descendants of the Haitian Generals of the Independence of the North - Raimond de Bottex, and his son Narcéus Bottex (18th and 19th centuries).

Like Seymour, he worked for a time for the Galerie Issa in Port-au-Prince. Considered a naïve artist, his work is best known for its two separate styles:

- painting directly from social inspiration, often depicting daily Haitian life
- religious themes feature often in his work - as in his younger brother Seymour's work

Often exhibited in Haiti, particularly at the Centre d'Art, his works have also featured in numerous exhibitions worldwide.
