= Jean-René Cazalets =

Jean-René Cazalets is a neuroscientist and the director of the Institut de Neurosciences Cognitives et Intégratives d'Aquitaine (INCIA, CNRS UMR5287) at the University of Bordeaux. He obtained his PhD in 1987 for research done on the nervous system of lobsters.
