= Roland Blain =

Haitian painter

Roland Blain (June 30, 1934 - July 18, 2005) was a Haitian painter. A Port-au-Prince native, Blain typically painted nature scenes—jungles, animals, exotic birds, and landscapes. He died in Brooklyn, New York in 2005.
