= Nicolas Dreux =

Haitian painter

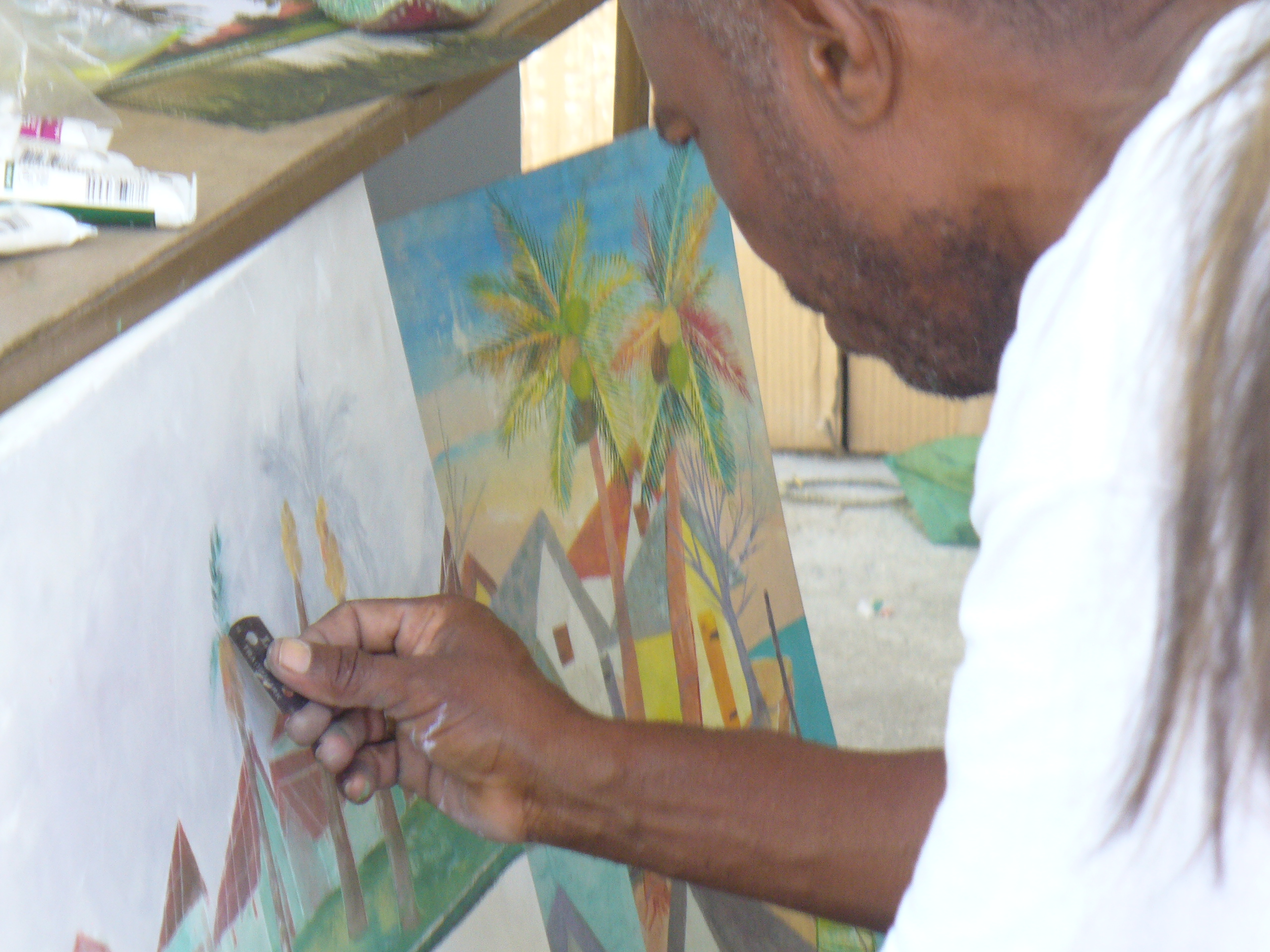
- Nicolas Dreux using razor blade to create a fine oil painting
- Born: 1956-2021; Port-au-Prince

Nicolas Dreux (born 1956) is a Haitian painter. Born and raised in Port-au-Prince. He showed an early interest in painting and studied under Calixte Henri, one of Haiti's early master. With Raymond Olivier, he generated a style that differed from many other Haitian artists.

During the Aristide period Dreux was so traumatized by the violence that he suffered a breakdown. With the 2004 departure of Aristide, and his government, Dreus started a slow battle to regain his mental balance and revive his ability to create fine art. His first efforts were childlike but, over the intervening years, Dreux has regained his position as a master in the Haitian art community.

His work is displayed in many of Haiti's finest art galleries.

He works with acrylics and oil – using a razor blade to create his pieces.
