= Ralph Allen (painter, born 1952) =

Haitian painter

Ralph Allen (born 1952) is a Haitian painter. Born in Port-au-Prince, Allen was awarded a scholarship to the National Academy of Design's School of Fine Arts in New York City. His paintings have been exhibited at the Loeb Center at New York University, the National Audubon Society, and at his alma mater, the National Academy of Design.

== Early years ==
Ralph Allen was born on June 14, 1952. He studied in Port-au-Prince at the Colleges St. Martial, Max Penette and Bird.

== Career ==
In 1971 he left Haiti for New York. He received a scholarship to the National Academy School of Fine Arts, where he studied drawing, painting, graphic arts and sculpture. He won The Albert H. Baldin Award, the Lucrecia Bori Award, and the Dr. Ralph Weiler Award. In 1972 he represented the Haitian Arts at the New-York University Loeb Center. In 1975 his works were accepted by the Annual Exhibition of the National Academy of Design, the Audubon Artists of America, and the American Watercolor Society. His work was selected for a traveling exhibition throughout the U.S. and Australia. He met artists like Charles White, Jacob Lawrence, Avel deKnight and discovered Afro-American painting. He exhibited with fellow students of the Academy at the Ringwood Manor Museum in New Jersey and the Pioneer Gallery in Cooperstown. In 1976 he returned to Haiti where he exhibits in group shows.

== Exhibitions ==
- 1978 - First One-man Show at the Galerie Panamericaine, Haiti. The critic Roland Thadal calls him: The poor people's painter.
- 1979 - One-man Show at Galerie Marassa, Haiti, and group show at Galerie Soley'o in Martinique where he meets local artists and discusses with René Louise who was conceiving an Aesthetic philosophy for the Caribbean artist called "Modern Marroonism". Later he exhibited in Guadeloupe and French Guiana where he also met local artists and discussed Art in the region.
- 1980 - One-man Show at Le Papyrus, Haiti. Pierre Monosiet, Director of the Musee d'Art Haitien wrote: "you have a lot to bring to the renewal of Haitian Arts."
- 1981 - He meets Lois Mailou Jones and Paul Goodnight with whom he finds some affinities, and who invites him to exhibit with him and Jean-René Jerome at the Nyangoma Gallery in Washington DC.
- 1985 - One-man Show at the Musee d'Art Haitien.
- 1987 - Two-man Shows with Valcin II at the Musee d'Art Haitien as a Commemoration for the February 7th ( considered in Haiti as Freedom Day).. He then heads an Exhibit of Haitian Arts at the Hotel Ivoire, in Ivory Coast and takes part in a drawing show at Le Grand Palais, in Paris, France.
- 1988 - Exhibit with Ralph Chapoteau, Katia San Millan and Obes Faustin at the Galeria Boinayel in Santo Domingo. He then participates in group shows in Martinique with Valcin II and Etzer Charles, at the "Contemporary Imprints" at Fort St Louis.
- 1991 - Arte Bienal in Cuenca, Ecuador and "Regard sur Haiti" in Dinard, France. He tours Museums and Galleries in Paris. Group shows at Art Expo and Musee d'Art Haitien where he participates in a group Mural commemorating Martin Luther King.
- 1993 - Solidarity with Raoul Denis Jr. at Festival Arts Gallery. Group shows with Galerie Nader in Japan, Galerie Monsieur Henry in Miami and Carib Art in N.Y.
- 1997 - Group show at The Mupanah in Haiti.
- 1999 - Exhibit of Haitian Art at the Milagro Center in West Palm Beach.
- 2000 - Group shows in private residencies in Miami and N.Y. and One-man Show at the Atrium in Martinique and Culturenet, Haiti.
