= Francis Paraison =

Haitian painter

Francis Paraison (c. 1958 – c. 2003) was a Haitian painter. His painting Three Tigers in the Moonlight is part of the Huntington Museum of Art Haitian art collection.

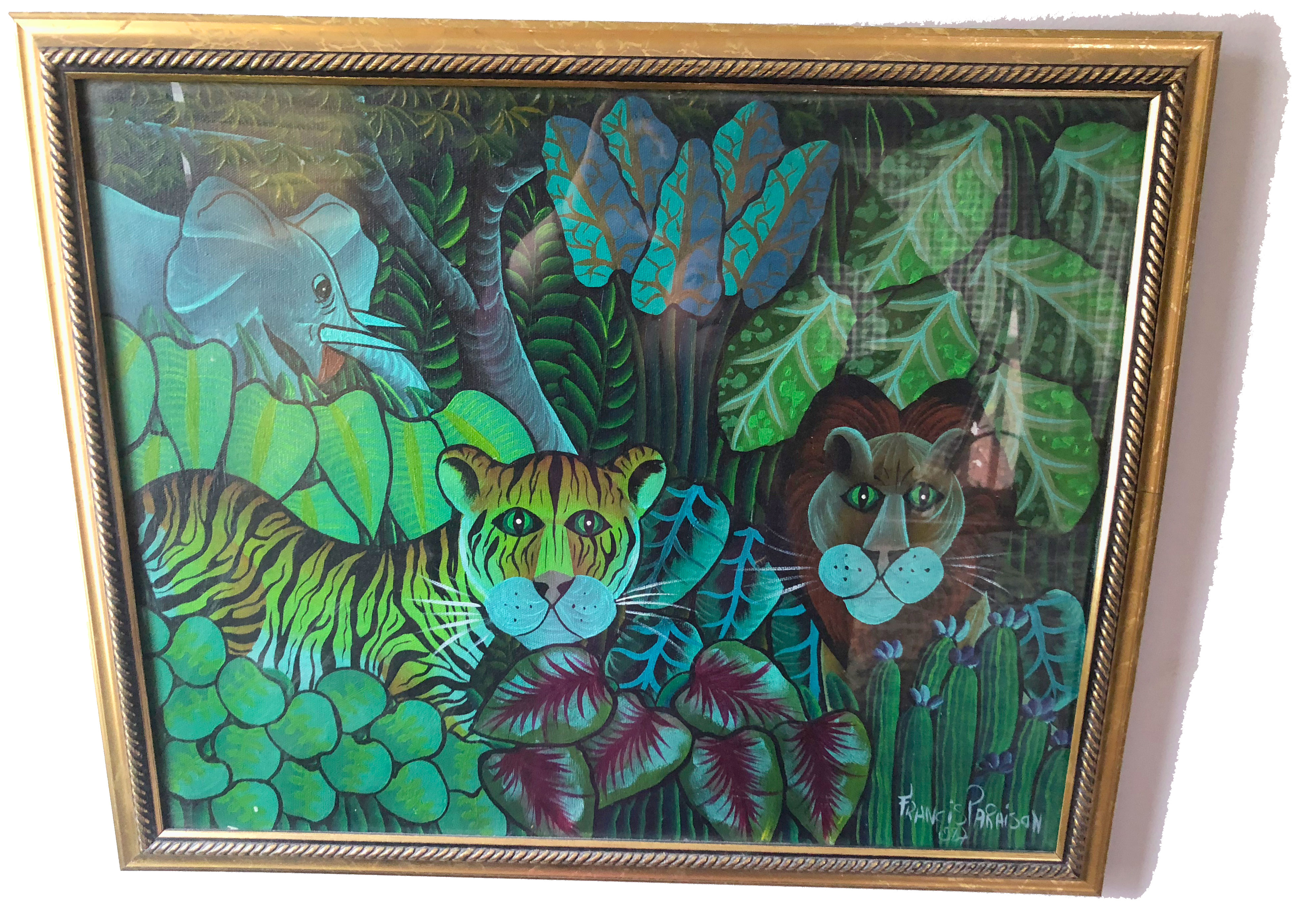
Francis Paraison "Haitian Jungle" painting (1987)
