= Scherezade García =

Visual artist

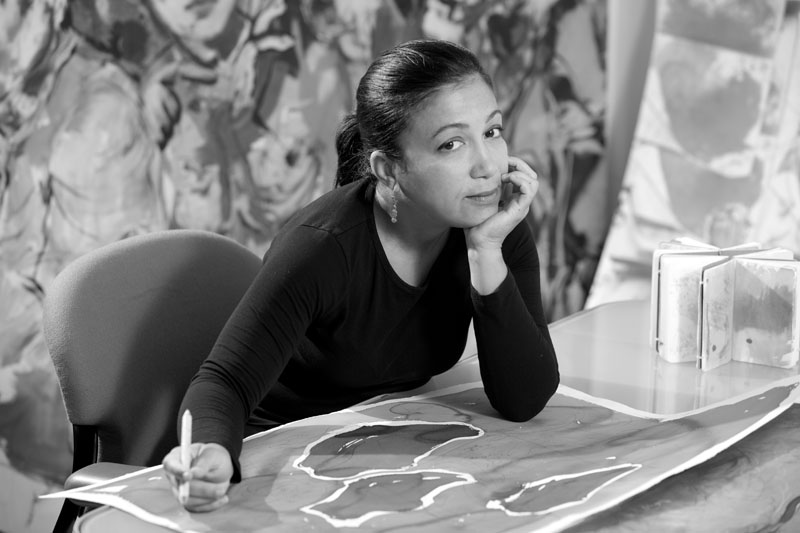
- Scherezade García, Photograph by William Vázquez
- Born: Scherezade García; 1966 (age 59–60); Santo Domingo, Dominican Republic
- Education: Altos de Chavón School of Design (AAS), Parsons School of Design (BFA), CUNY City College of New York (MFA)
- Known for: Painting, Installation Art, Sculpture, Drawing, Video
- Awards: Joan Mitchell Foundation Painters and Sculptors Grant (2015), Colene Brown Art Prize (2020)
- Elected: Board of Directors, College Art Association
- Website: scherezade.net

Scherezade García (sometimes Scherezade García-Vázquez) (born 1966) is a Dominican-born, American painter, printmaker, and installation artist. She is a co-founder of the Dominican York Proyecto GRÁFICA Collective. García is an Advisor to the Board of Directors of No Longer Empty and sits on the board of directors of the College Art Association (CAA) for the period of 2020–2024. She is assistant professor of Art at the University of Texas at Austin. She currently lives and works in Brooklyn, New York and Austin, Texas.

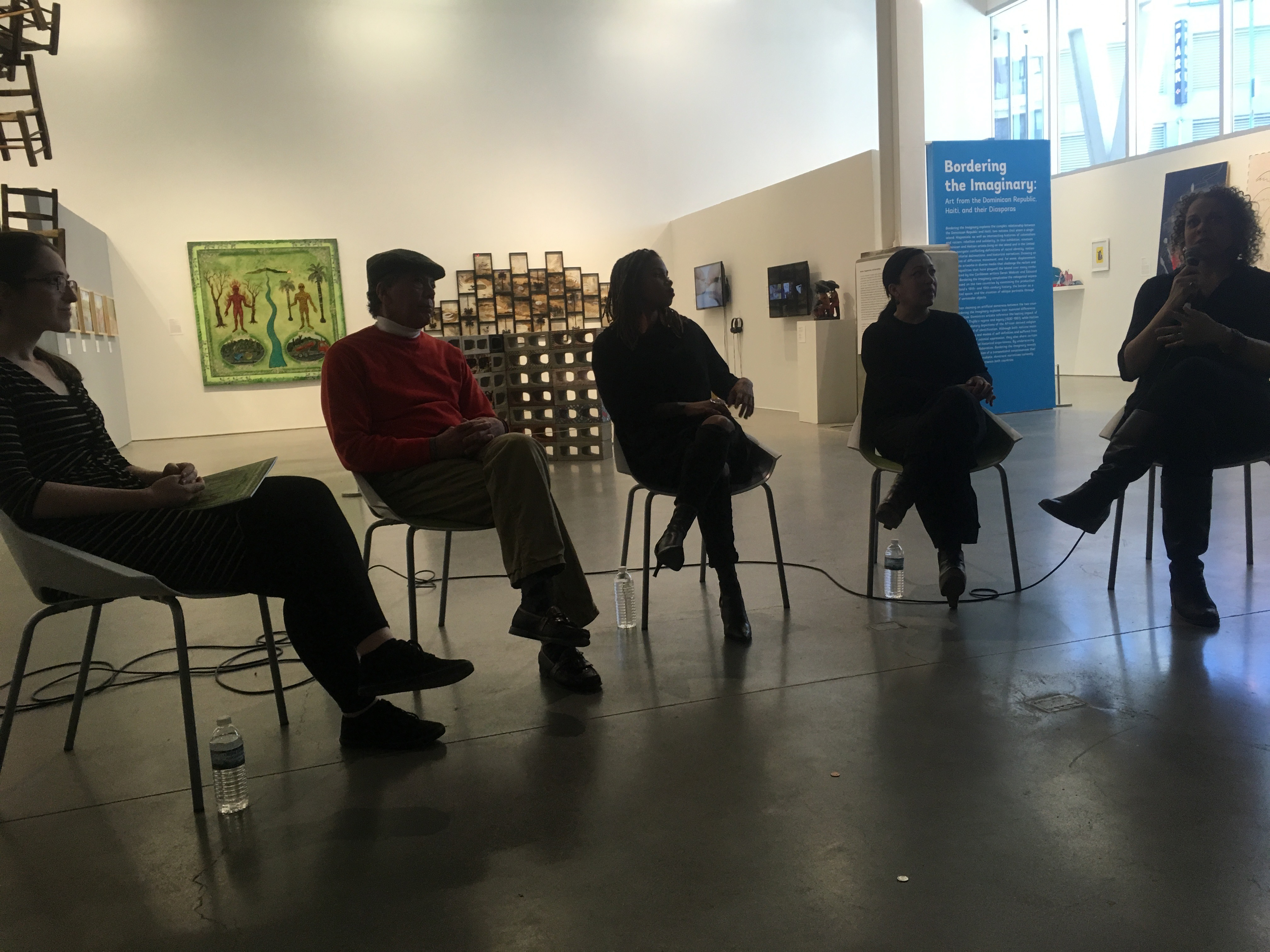
(discussion at BRIC Gallery 2018) during the exhibition Bordering the Imagery: Art From The Dominican Republic, Haiti and Their Diasporas. Curator, Abigail Lapin Dardashti; and artists: Freddy Rodríguez, Fabiola Jean-Louis, Scherezade García, and Vladimir Cybil Charlier

== Early life and education ==
Born in Santo Domingo, Dominican Republic, García has been active in the visual arts from the time she was a child. After graduating with an AAS from the Altos de Chavón School of Design, a Parsons affiliate, in La Romana, Dominican Republic in 1986, she won a full merit scholarship to attend Parsons School of Design in New York City. She received a BFA cum laude from Parsons in 1988 and completed an MFA in Sculpture at City College of New York in 2011. Since 1986, she has lived and worked in New York. She is the sister of artist Iliana Emilia García.

== Career ==
She served on the faculty of Parsons School of Design from 2010 to 2021. She joined the University of Texas at Austin as Assistant Professor of Art in 2021. In 2015, she received a career grant from the Joan Mitchell Foundation. Much of García's work deals with themes relating to themes of history, colonially and Afro-Atlantic legacies; her art is informed by aspects of her black and European heritage. Four of her mixed-media works are in the collection of the Smithsonian American Art Museum. Other works may be found in the collections of El Museo del Barrio, the Housatonic Museum of Art, and the Museo de Arte Moderno Santo Domingo.

== Selected works ==
- Paradise Redefined: at the Lehman College Art Gallery, December 2006, a sculptural installation of tent like structures covered with images of Dominican tenant buildings and bodegas, with light, street sounds and fragments of Spanish language emanating from within. Intermittently breaking wave sounds add to the mix coming from a mural size beach scene. "The installation is concerned with issues of identity and homeland, and the expectations of a better life, which often characterize stories of migration to the United States." said Benjamin Gennochio, critic for The New York Times.
- Hurricane Sandy Altar: 2013, is a painting featured in an essay by Abigail Lapin Dardashti titled El Dorado: the Neobaroque in Dominican American Art, focusing the use of gold by Dominican artists who subvert myths and dreams constructed by imperialist and neocolonialist economic and political systems
- Transit/Liquid Highway: September 2015, exhibited in the lobby of Columbia University's Wallach Art Gallery Miller Theatre, is a site-specific mural explores the relationship between the Dominican Republic and immigrants new homeland. Large images of waves and found objects both intermix losses and gains of migration
- Acariciando el chivo/Caressing the Goat: The painting García's painting hearkens to the 19th century after the island's separation and re-colonization by Spain. Depicted as an androgynous, Black child holding a goat, Ulises Heureaux - known as Lili and born illegitimately to a Haitian father and a mother from St. Thomas - is shown in Garcia's beautifully abstracted painting as a ghostly image existing between two swirling universes. As the man who led the country of Santo Domingo during the years 1882 until Lili's assassination in 1899 he was considered heroic, and very much a contradiction of the 20th century myth of racial whiteness that the dictator Trujillo later projected. The painting was featured in the exhibition Bordering the Imaginary: Art from the Dominican Republic, Haiti, and their Diasporas, curated by Abigail Lapin Dardashti in 2018 at BRIC Gallery, which explored the dynamic of the Haitian/Dominican diaspora.
- Memories of a Utopian Island: A site-specific installation and video animation Conversation Thread in collaboration with Vladimir Cybil Charlier. Two projected silhouettes of the artists tackle contemporary issues related to their island of origin that includes both Haiti and Dominican Republic. Speaking in a mixture of French, English and Spanish and Haitian Creole the silhouettes talk back and forth about an environment of equality and collaboration rather than one of friction. On another wall Borlette (Lottery) combines the sculptural inner tubes made of rice paper beaded to resemble Voodou flags, signature elements respectively of García and Charlier's individual practices.
