= Murat Brierre =

Haitian metal sculptor (1938–1988)

Murat Brierre or Murat Briere (1938–1988) was one of Haiti's principal metal sculptors and was known for his recycling of surplus oil drum lids. He was influenced by George Liautaud, but his work acquired its own highly experimental style, often focusing on multi-faceted and conjoined figures, fantastically personified elements, and unborn babies visible within larger creatures.

== Early life and career ==
Brierre worked as a brick mason, cabinetmaker, tile setter, and blacksmith. He was born in Mirebalais or Port-au-Prince, Haiti and was the younger of two brothers. His older brother, Edgar Brierre, was a painter and sculptor. The brother's signed their works with only their last name, creating some confusion within their professional circles about the authorship of their work.

Brierre's sculptures typically ranged from three to six feet in length and reflected Christian, Haitian Vodou, and folklore themes. Brierre was also a painter, but ultimately chose to work with metal because he felt that the material was saturated with spiritual energy. It was a laborious process. The oil drum lids were hammered flat, drawn onto, then cut with a razor. The sheet was then cut with a chisel before finishing was completed with a file. By the mid1970s, Brierre's sculptures included pronounced areas of cut outs surrounding long curved lines of metal. Brierre's iron sculpture titled Chien de Mer overlays a dog head onto the body of a fish.

== Solo exhibitions ==
1967 – Haitian Art Gallery, New York

1968 – Centre d'Art, Port-au-Prince, Haiti; Bradley Galleries, Milwaukee, Wisconsin; Georgetown Graphics Gallery, Washington D.C.; Menschoff Gallery, Chicago; John Michael Kohler Arts Center, Sheboygan, Wisconsin; Roko Gallery, New York

1969 – Centre d'Art, Port-au-Prince, Haiti; Showcase Gallery, Washington D.C.; Botolph Group, Boston

1970 – Centre d'Art, Port-au-Prince, Haiti

1971 – Centre d'Art, Port-au-Prince, Haiti

1972 – Centre d'Art, Port-au-Prince, Haiti; Roko Gallery, New York

1973 – Centre d'Art, Port-au-Prince, Haiti

1979 – Areta Contemporary Design, Boston

== Group exhibitions ==
1969 – Davenport Art Gallery, Iowa

1974 – Davenport Art Gallery, Iowa

1978 – Brooklyn Museum, New York (traveling)

1980 – Davenport Art Gallery, Iowa

1982 – Studio Museum in Harlem, New York

1983 – Chicago Public Library Cultural Center

1985 – Davenport Art Gallery, Iowa

1987 – Musée du Panthéon National, Port-au-Prince, Haiti

1988 – Galeries Nationales d'Exposition du Grand Palais, Paris

1989 – Museum of Art, Ft. Lauderdale, Florida

2006 – Phyllis Kind Gallery in conjunction with the Outsider Art Fair, New York

== Works of art ==
L'Araignée (The Spider), 1970, iron

Bawon Samdi, 1970, iron

Christ sur la Croix (Christ on the Cross), 1970, iron

Four Sirens, 1966, iron

Ogou, 1970, iron

Le Sagittaire en Démon (Sagittarius and Demon), no date, iron

Visage en Fer (Face in Iron), 1965, iron
