= Iliana Emilia García =

Visual artist

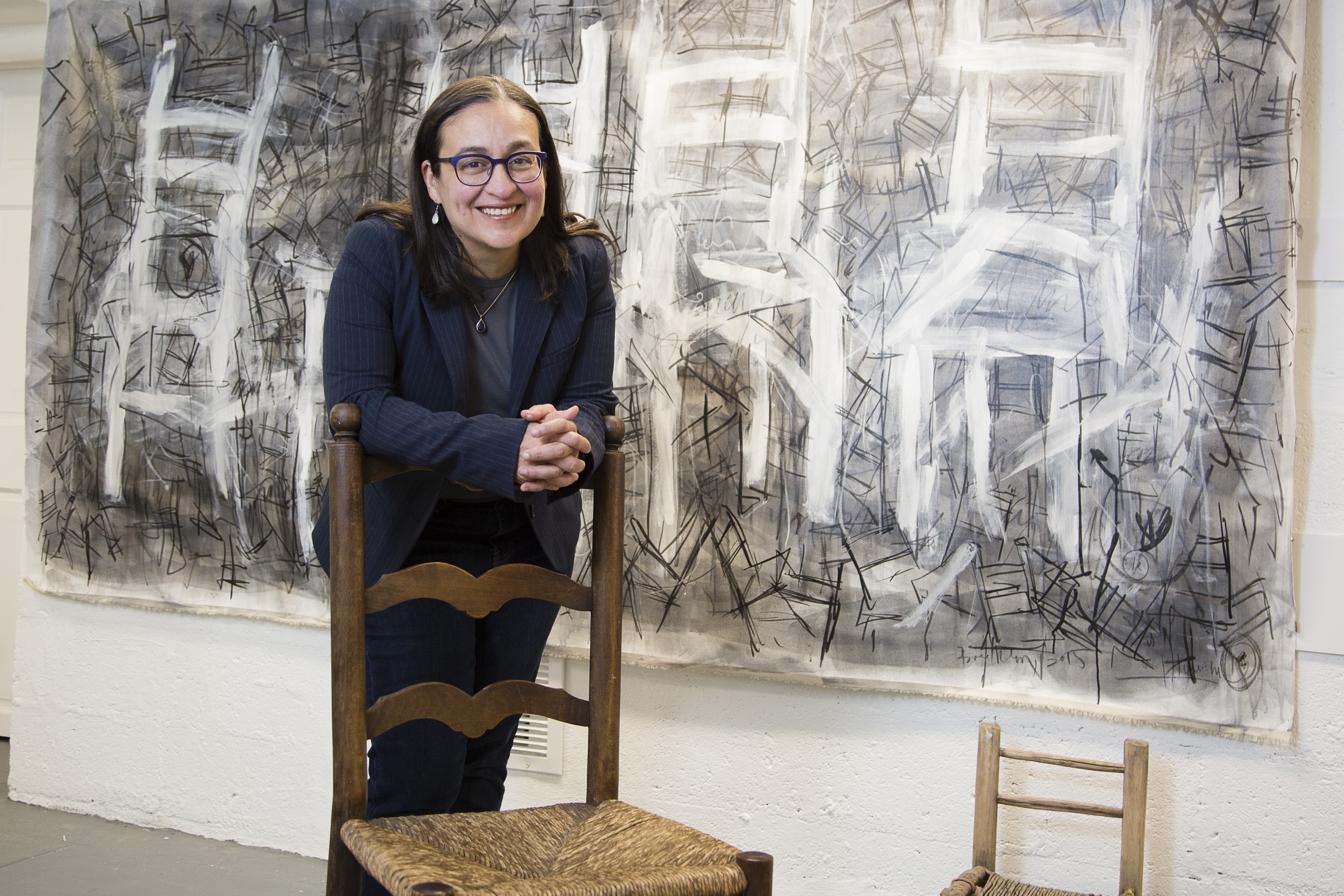
- Iliana Emilia García, Photograph by William Vázquez, 2016.
- Born: 1970 (age 54–55); Santo Domingo, Dominican Republic
- Education: Altos de Chavón School of Design (AAS), Parsons School of Design (BFA)
- Known for: Painting, drawing, sculpture, installation art
- Website: ilianaemilia.com

Iliana Emilia García is a visual artist, who was born in 1970 in Santo Domingo, Dominican Republic. She is a visual artist and sculptor known for large-scale paintings and installations. She is a co-founder of the Dominican York Proyecto GRÁFICA (DYPG) Collective. She lives in Brooklyn, New York.

== Early life and education ==
Iliana Emilia García was born into a family of poets, writers, and artists in Santo Domingo, Dominican Republic. She is the sister of artist Scherezade García. As a child, she took art lessons with Elías Delgado and Nidia Serra, participating in international children art competitions in China and Brazil. A classically trained pianist, she attended the National Conservatory of Music in Santo Domingo, Dominican Republic.

In 1989, García graduated summa cum laude with an AAS degree from Altos de Chavón School of Design in La Romana, Dominican Republic where she studied under Rafaél Álvarez, Carlos Montesino, and Russell Christopherson. She was awarded the Ruth Vanderpool Scholarship to attend Parsons School of Design in New York where she received a BFA in Communication Design in 1991. She settled permanently in New York in 1989.

== Residencies, awards and honors ==
- Art in Embassies U.S. Department of State, Madrid, Spain
- Surf Point Foundation Residency, York, Maine, 2022.
- BRIC/Goya Residency, La Romana, Dominican Republic, 2018.
- Aljira Emerge 8, A Career Management and Exhibition Program for Emerging Artists.

== Art series ==
- Fresh Produce, 2000 Early on Holland Cotter spotted her using still-life themes of nourishment, consumption and decay in a group show in Harlem. "In a crisp, lucid installation, Iliana Emilia turns bread and water into a yeasty version of stripped-down Donald Judd furniture."
- Almas Transparentes, 2001 Early small scale charcoal on paper, before her installation pieces.
- Story Piles, 2012 Installation of chairs hung from the ceiling, some with neon strings representing people and events that pass through our lives. the histories of individual people, the resistance against change.
- The Pursuit of Happiness/Buscando Felicidad, 2014 This installation, made with wood, rope, metal hooks, and silkscreen features abstracted chairs against the wall, produces a vision of movement, migration, memories, and history.
- Yo. Aquí, Allá En Todas Partes/ I. Here, There and Everywhere, 2015 Chairs as a symbol of tradition, craftsmanship, and culture, specifically that of Dominican Republic. representing the emotional history of objects.
- Historias acumuladas, 2015 This is a three part series of works made with acrylic, ink, charcoal, and pencil on canvas was a clear inspiration for I. Here, There and Everywhere also of that year.
- The Sage and the Dreamer, 2018. In this site-specific installation at BRIC Gallery, 40 cabilma and oak wood and guano woven chairs are arranged in the form of a tree enveloping, rising and turning as branches towards the ceiling. As these hand-made woven chairs have become scarce in the Dominican Republic for about a decade, García commissioned a retired chair maker to build the chairs for the exhibition.

== Solo and duo exhibitions ==
- 1996: To Get to Heaven/Para llegar al cielo, Galería Fundación de Arte Nouveau, Santo Domingo, Dominican Republic
- 2016: La razón/el objeto/la palabra, The Reason/The Object/The Word, Galería ASR Contemporáneo, Santo Domingo, Dominican Republic
- 2019: Visual Memory: Home + Place, iliana emilia García + Scherezade García, Art Museum of the Americas, Washington, D.C.
- 2022: Memory Keepers / Albaceas de la Memoria, William Paterson University, Wayne, New Jersey
- 2023: Agua Firme, University of Pittsburgh Art Galleries, Pittsburgh, Pennsylvania
