= Montas Antoine =

Haitian painter

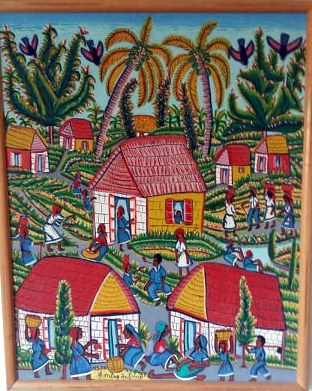
huile Antoine Montas

Montas Antoine (13 December 1926–1988) was a Haitian painter. He was born in Léogâne in 1926, and he painted colorful street scenes and rural scenes in his life. He died in 1988.
