= Jean René Baroux =

Canadian writer (1922–1992)

Jean René Baroux (1922–1992) was a Morocco-born veteran of World War II and a writer very much engaged in the evolution of the French language. While a member of the Science Council of Canada (Director of Communications), in 1976 he founded the Association Québécoise des Professionnels de la Communication Scientifique (AQPCS), a complementary extension to the Canadian Scientific Writers Association.

Baroux was born in Casablanca. A veteran of the North African Corp from Morocco, he participated in the liberation of Italy first, and then France, from German occupation. He fought in what is considered the biggest and bloodiest land battle of World War II, the Battle of Monte Cassino, where an estimated third of a million people died through the first five months of 1944. He was also one of the soldiers who reached the demolished abbey, having been directly involved in the final, and decisive assault on German forces ensconced in the Benedictine Monastery. In August 1944, he landed with allied forces on the beaches around Saint-Tropez, France, as part of Operation Dragoon which launched a 25-mile front onto the German invasion forces in Provence. He survived through another year of battle, moving North attacking the retreating German forces, through Gap, then Grenoble and on to Paris. He was awarded the Croix de Guerre for bravery in battle during the war. He died in Nanaimo, British Columbia, Canada.

== Book ==
- La Méditation Intime (The Intimate Meditation) by Jean Baroux (1982): National Library of Canada
