= Arijac =

Haitian painter

Harry Jacques (born 1937), known by the pseudonym Arijac, is a Haitian painter. He was born in Gonaïves, Haiti. After completing high school, Arijac took international correspondence courses in architecture and worked as a draftsman from 1962 to 1963 for the noted artist Sacha Thèbaud's (Tebo) architecture firm. Arijac also worked in the school construction division of the Department of Agriculture until 1975. Thèbaud taught Arijac to paint in the 2000-year-old encaustic method, which involves using an iron with a mixture of beeswax, turpentine and pigment to create images. Considered one of Haiti's finest painters, Arijac has exhibited work at the American Institute, the French Institute, the São Paulo Biennial and in New York City.

Paintings by Arijac have been sold by the Friends of HAS Haiti to raise funds for the Hôpital Albert Schweitzer Haiti, located in Deschapelles.
