= Levoy Exil =

Haitian artist and painter

- Born: Fermathe, Haiti
- Occupation: Painter
- Known for: Saint Soleil Art movement

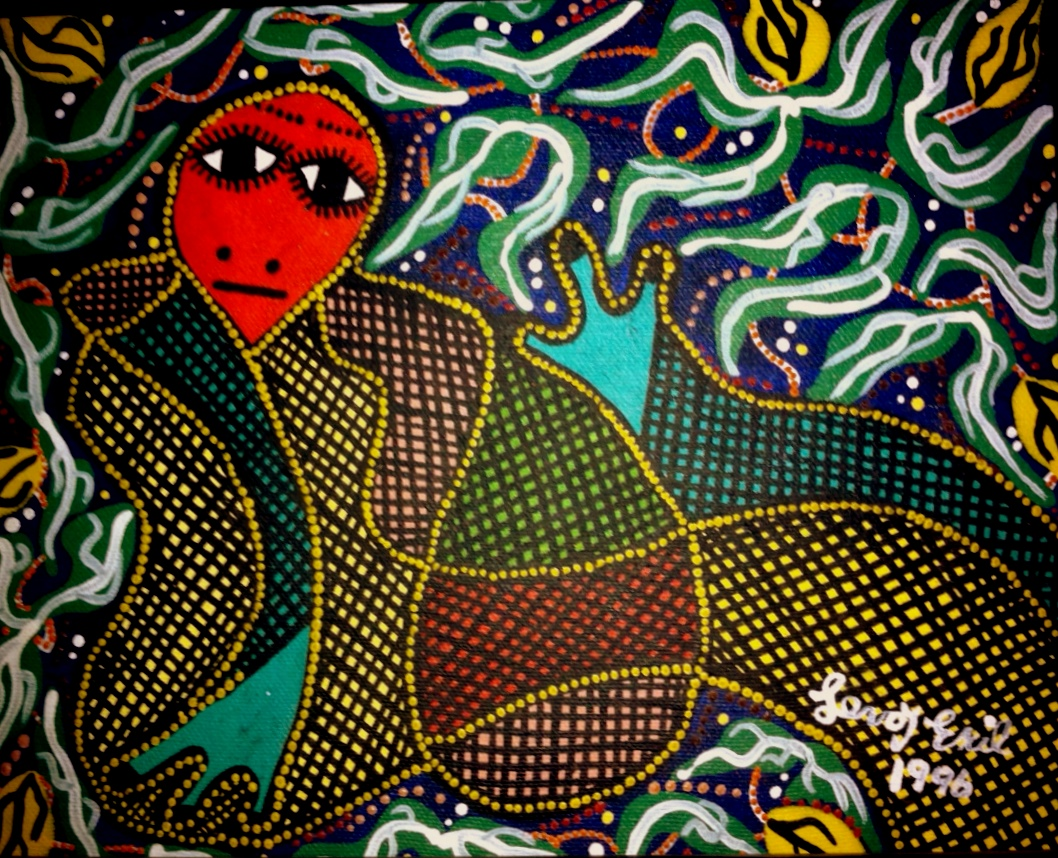
Red "Loa" Painting, by Levoy Exil, 1996 Acrylic on Canvas.

Levoy Exil (born 1944), is a master Haitian artist and painter; he is one of the main contributors to the Saint Soleil art movement.

Exil's paintings are mystical and abstract and often depict Haitian Vodou Loas, suns and stars, birds, and Marassas. His painting style is primitive and dreamlike and employs the Pointillism technique of applying small, distinct dots in a pattern to reveal an image. There are rarely unused portions of the canvas in his works and he draws from African, Haitian and Vodou influences. Exil has participated in conferences focused on Haitian Vodou, including KOSANBA's 9th International Colloquium held in Mirebalais in July, 2009.

Levoy Exil was born in 1944, in Haiti. Along with Prospere Pierre-Louis, Dieuseul Paul, Denis Smith, and Louisiane Saint Fleurant he formed the renowned Cinq Soleil (Five Suns) art movement. The Five Suns group formed out of the Saint Soleil movement, of which Levoy Exil was a member and master painter.

His work is well regarded by collectors and he has exhibited in France, Rome, the United States and parts of Asia. Haitian Art historian Seldon Rodman referenced Exil's paintings in his book “Where Art is Joy: Haitian Art: The First Forty Years”

In 2010, Exil was featured in a CNN article after the earthquake that struck Haiti. Later that year the Smithsonian Institution sponsored the Folklife Festival in Washington DC which featured presentations and art work by Levoy Exil and other prominent Haitian artists.
