= Samuel Roker =

Haitian painter (born 1953)

Samuel Roker (born 21 February 1953) is a Haitian painter.

== Early life and education ==
Born in Cap-Haïtien, Roker studied at a branch of the Academie des Beaux Arts in Port-au-Prince (1971–73) and at the Mayer School of Fashion Design in New York (1989–90).

== Career ==
In 1984, he won first prize from the Ocean Parkway Community Development Corporation in Brooklyn, NY, and the following year won first prize from All Community Arts in Brooklyn. He has had solo exhibitions at the Galleria Et Encadrement 25 in Paris (1988), the Afro American Center in Charlotte, NC (1991), and at the Roker Art Gallery in Miami, FL (2000, 2001, 2002). His work has been included in numerous group exhibitions, including ones in Port-au-Prince, Miami, New York, Germany, Puerto Rico, and Key West. Much of his early work was inspired by the natural landscape and culture of Haiti, though he has also explored a more modern abstract style.
