= Leonel Jules =

Léonel Jules
- Born: 29 December 1953 (age 72); Port-au-Prince, Haiti
- Known for: Painter, Artist
- Movement: Carré Plastique

Leonel Jules is a Canadian painter from Montreal, Quebec. A graduate of the Université du Québec in Fine Arts, he has done research in art history and semiotics, devoting himself to painting and the diffusion of art though a television show and a research center known as Art-Media.

== Influences ==
The artist was influenced by Paul Klee for his interest of drawing rhythms, graphics and spirituality. Matisse offered a portfolio of color and collage. Riopelle and les Automatistes Québécois contributed stimulated energy by their gestures. Picasso, especially Guernica, showed him that transcendence could come from painting.

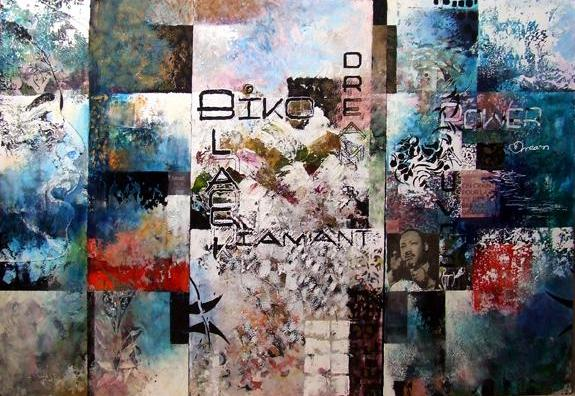
Obama Black and White Dream

== Recognition ==
- 2004–2005 Creation grant, SODAC
- 1989 Canadian Painters Award, Montreal
- 1985 Gold Medal, Visual Arts National Competition
- 1984 Silver Medal and Honourable Mention, Visual Arts National Competition

== Collections ==
Jules' works appear in private and public collections such as the Musée d'Art Contemporain de Montréal, the Musée de Joliette, Martineau Walker Collection, the Collection of the National Bank of Canada, Loto Québec Collection, Collection and Provigo in Montreal, as well as other private collections in Germany, Los Angeles, New Jersey, Miami, Switzerland, Monte Carlo and Haiti.
