= Petion Savain =

Petion Savain (15 February 1906 – 1973) was a prolific Haitian artist and writer.

Savain was born in Port-au-Prince and studied at the Haitian School of Agronomy from which received a degree in law. He began painting in his early years and by his early thirties he was also the author of one book, La Case de Damballah. La Case de Damballah was published in 1939 (Imprimerie de L'Etat) and republished in 1970 (Kraus Reprint). The novel also appeared in the 1943 publication Les Oeuvres Nouvelles, Vol. 3 (Edition De La Maison Francaise). Savain eventually became a newspaper columnist, as well as lawyer, teacher, and author.

His artistic works, known for their bright colors, have been displayed in numerous art galleries, such as the Corcoran Gallery and the Grand Central and Riverside Museum in New York.

Savain died in 1973.
