= Lyonel Laurenceau =

Haitian painter

Lyonel Laurenceau (born 1942) is a Haitian painter. Laurenceau studied in Haiti, in the US and in France and creates paintings inspired by the human character. He won first prize at the New York City World's Fair in 1966 and later moved to Montreal (Canada) where he was made an honorary citizen of the city of Montreal.

His work adheres to the contemporary undercurrents of Symbolic Expressionism. It continues to shape its era and ranks among the most sought after by art collectors. The paintings sometimes win in rhythm and color, whereas they sometimes overflow of emotions. They are heightened by a spellbinding light and bear witness to an ingenious construct: The paintings reveal a spatial network that consists of overlapping and overlaying cells that form a subtle play of transparencies.

Painter of international renown, Lyonel Laurenceau has won numerous prizes worldwide and is considered to be one of the best of his generation. His works have been exhibited in many countries including the United States, Canada, the Dominican Republic, Colombia and many others. More than fifty museums throughout the world have already honored his work.
