= Luce Turnier =

Haitian modern artist (1924–1994)

- Born: Luce Turnier; February 24, 1924; Jacmel, Haiti
- Died: 1994 (aged 69–70); Paris, France
- Education: Centre d'Art; Art Students League of New York
- Occupation: Visual artist
- Spouse(s): Eugenio Carpi de Resmini (m. 1954) Christian Lesmele (m. 1965)
- Children: 2
- Writing career
- Genres: Painting, Collage

Luce Turnier (February 24, 1924 – 1994) was a Haitian painter and collage artist. One of Haiti's leading artists, Turnier achieved international renown for her fusion of Haitian culture and modernist style.

== Early life, education, and work ==
Turnier was born in Jacmel, Haiti, in 1924. After a hurricane devastated southern Haiti in 1937, Turnier's family relocated to Port-au-Prince.

She began painting in 1944 when, at the age of 21, she enrolled at Le Centre d'Art in Port-au-Prince and became one of the art school/gallery's founding members. As a young artist, she admired the work of Candido Portinari and Käthe Kollwitz, though she reported growing out of these early influences. In a 1983 interview, Turnier described her early art education: "When I worked at the Art Centre, we started with still life and model. We had ... a nude, two models, and still life. ... On Saturday we used to go out to do landscape."

N'zengou-Tayo described Turnier, along with Marie-Josée Nadal and Rose-Marie Desruisseaux, the Le Centre's other founding female artists, as belonging to Haiti's middle class. Though their higher status afforded them the opportunity to study art, middle class Haitian society of the time did not encourage women to pursue the arts, often painting them as deviants. Turnier recalled that, while many women came by for a class or two, Le Centre d'Art had only about four or five regular women artists during these early years. She described the disdainful attitude the Haitian bourgeoisie initially held toward Le Centre's artists, viewing them "like hippies" or "punks"

Her paintings were featured in the Le Centre d'Art's monthly Studio No. 3 magazine. She and a constellation of artists affiliated with the institution, including Albert Mangones, Gerald Bloncourt, Maurice Borno, Rigaud Benoit, Hector Hyppolite, Daniel Lafontant, and others formed the nexus of the Haitian Art Movement. The period between 1946 and 1950, encompassing the early years of Turnier's artistic work, is also called "The Haitian Renaissance."

In 1946, with the support of UNESCO, Turnier's works were exhibited at the Musée d'Art Moderne de Paris.

From December 8, 1949 until June 1950, her "Self-Portrait" was exhibited within the fine arts pavilion at the International Bi-Centennial Celebration of Port-au-Prince. In 1950, Turnier and Lucien Price helped to found an art gallery, The Foyer.

During the early 1950s, the French and Haitian governments awarded Turnier scholarships to study abroad in the United States and Europe and she had several exhibits in Europe. She studied in both New York City and Paris as she struggled to develop a personal style that encompassed her Haitian heritage without capitulating to the tastes of the market and its preconceived notions about what "Haitian" art was or should look like. In New York City, Turnier studied at the Art Students League where she became steeped in modernist theory that "disdained spatial illusionism, insisting on maintaining the integrity of the picture plane as a flat surface"

== Personal life ==
She married Eugenio Carpi de Resmini, an Italian painter, in 1954. The couple had two children. She remarried in 1965 to the French painter Christian Lemesle.

After her return to Haiti in the 1970s, Turnier enjoyed increasing popularity at home and abroad. Turnier died in 1994 in Paris, France.

== Artistic style and critical reception ==
In assessing a 1947 exhibit at the Le Centre d'Art, the Belgian artist and critic Paul-Henri Bourguignon highly regarded Turnier's work, grouped with the avancés, advanced or modern style works, though he preferred the populaires, the naive and primitive, works. Whether one's work fell into the category of avancés or populaires had much to do with one's level of art education and, ultimately, class affiliation.

European and U.S. audiences of the 1940s and 1950s did not appreciate the sophisticated style of Turnier and other Haitian artists who produced work in the modern style. Art historian Gérald Alexis attributed the lack of enthusiasm for Haiti's modernist art in the United States to the McCarthyism that prevailed in the country from the late 1940s to mid-1950s. Like the works of Diego Rivera, modern works originating from the former colonies were labelled communist art.

Gallery curators and art collectors, too, sought more "different" and exotic works, for example those emphasizing themes of Haitian folklore and voodou. Despite opposing the prevailing tastes and trends of the time, various museums and archives, the Musée d'Art Haïtien, have preserved many of the works of the Haitian moderns, including Turnier.

Haitian writer Philippe Thoby-Marcelin described how Turnier, along with fellow artists Lucien Price and Luckner Lazare, left Le Centre d'Art because its founder, American watercolorist De Witt Peters, "unduly favor[ed] the popular painters." Despite this schism and the fact Turnier and many of her modernist cohorts left Haiti to study and live abroad, Efron perceived that the Haitian moderns still "succeed[ed] in effecting a rapprochement [sic] between themselves and the new, lower class painters of Haiti. Their painting, personal, modern, and eminently Haitian, has often been, to date, an example of a happy fusion of Haiti's two cultural streams."

In the 1950s and 1960s, Turnier painted abstract market scenes and other works depicting common people and the complexities of gender, class, and colorism in Haiti. Turnier expressed a preference for painting people when in Haiti and landscapes when in France. In 1967, influenced by her second husband, Christian Lemesle, Turnier began experimenting with collages. Turnier later described the period between 1965 and 1972, when she was married to Lemesle and living in Paris, as her "favorite period" of growth. She recalled this "special time" as one of heightened concentration when she created art for herself, with complete disregard for the aesthetic and commercial demands of the art world. Turnier described her works as becoming more abstract during this period.

She saw texture as holding central importance in her work and talked of incorporating organic elements, like banana leaves, in the works she created later in life, after returning to Haiti.
