= Haitian art =

Expression of Haitian culture and history

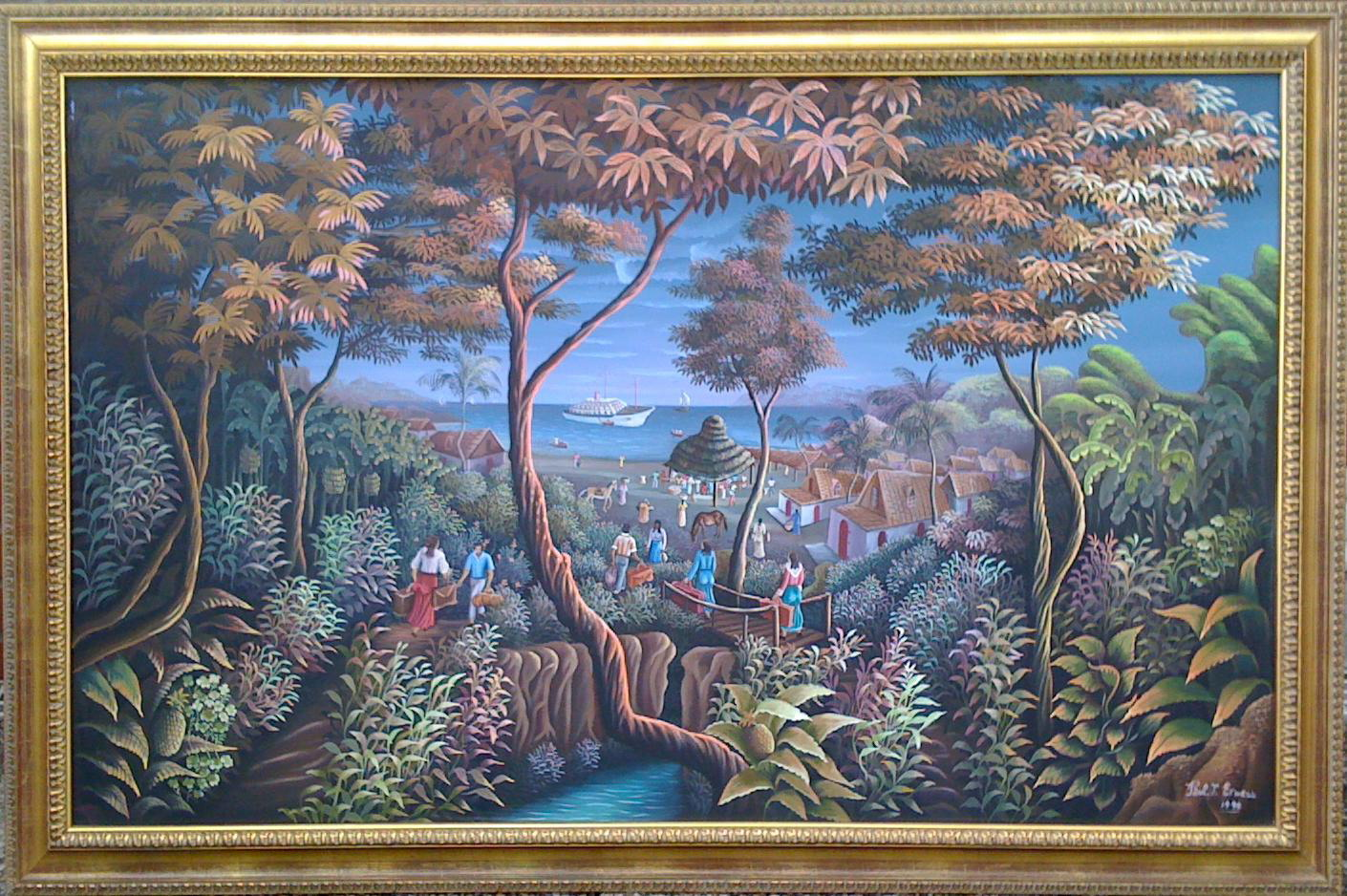
Les Voyageurs by Jules Ernest Paul

Haitian art is a complex tradition, reflecting African, Indigenous, American and European aesthetic and religious influences. It is an important expression of Haitian culture and history. Many artists cluster in "schools" of painting, such as the Cap-Haïtien school, which features depictions of daily life in the city, the Jacmel School, which reflects the steep mountains and bays of that coastal town, or the Saint-Soleil School, which is characterized by abstracted human forms and is heavily influenced by "Vaudou" symbolism.

== Painting ==
=== Centre d’Art ===
The Centre d'Art is an art center, school and gallery located in Port-au-Prince, Haiti. It was founded in 1944 by American watercolorist DeWitt Peters and several prominent Haitians from the intellectual and cultural circles including: Maurice Borno, Andrée Malebranche, Albert Mangonès, Lucien Price, and Georges Remponeau. Popular artists of this movement often were influenced by vaudou and include: André Pierre, Hector Hyppolite, Castera Bazile, Wilson Bigaud and Rigaud Benoit.

Haitian art is a type of artwork often characterized by vivid colors, spatial composition and spontaneity of painting.

By the mid 1950s, Haitian naïve art was firmly established, and other institutions began to emerge, such as the Foyer des Arts Plastiques (1950) and the Galerie Brochette (1956).

=== Saint Soleil School ===
Saint Soleil School, also known as "Movement Saint-Soleil", was founded in 1973 as a rural arts community called Soisson-la-Montagne, in Pétion-Ville, Haiti. This community was started by Jean-Claude Garoute and Maud Robart and they encouraged the academic study of painting, as well as maintaining influence by vaudou. Saint Soleil art is characterized by abstract human forms and the heavy influence of vaudou symbolism.

After Saint Soleil School disbanded, five remaining members of the school were renamed "Cinq Soleil" and include: Levoy Exil, Prosper Pierre Louis, Louisiane Saint Fleurant, Dieuseul Paul, Denis Smith.

A second generation member is Magda Magloire, the daughter of Louisiane Saint Fleurant.

=== Artibonite artists ===
The painters of the Artibonite department in north-western Haiti, where Hôpital Albert Schweitzer is located, have developed their own style, which is quite recognizable. The style began with Saincilus Ismaël (1940–2000), who was influenced by Byzantine art he had seen in books. Ismaël began to paint in 1956 after visiting the Centre d'Art in Port-au-Prince. His paintings are marked by exquisite detail. Every article of clothing, house, or tree is painted with a different intricate geometric pattern.

Délouis Jean-Louis grew up in Petite Rivière under the influence of Ismaël. Although he worked under Ismaël for 15 years, he never had formal painting lessons. He began painting to make money, but gradually began to paint carefully executed scenes from his imagination.

Alix Dorléus also learned to paint with Ismaël and Mrs. Mellon. He paints all day long and will paint anywhere he feels the spirit to motivate him. His best paintings are detailed depictions, like activity maps, of daily life in the Artibonite Valley.

Ernst Louizor is considered one of the best impressionist painters of Haiti. Louizor was born in Port-au-Prince on 16 October 1938. After high school (Lycée Toussaint L'Ouverture '57), he worked in the tax section of Customs. Louizor's painting career began in 1951, when at the age of 13 he joined the Centre d'Art and studied under Wilmino Domond. He later entered the Académie des Beaux-Arts shortly after its founding in 1959 and furthered his studies with Georges Remponeau. Louizor has many disciples including his wife Gerda Louizor. He has exhibited in Europe and the United States.

=== Diaspora outside of Haiti ===
Notable artists of Haitian descent and members of the diaspora include Jean-Michel Basquiat, Hersza Barjon and Ernst Registre.

=== Market painting ===
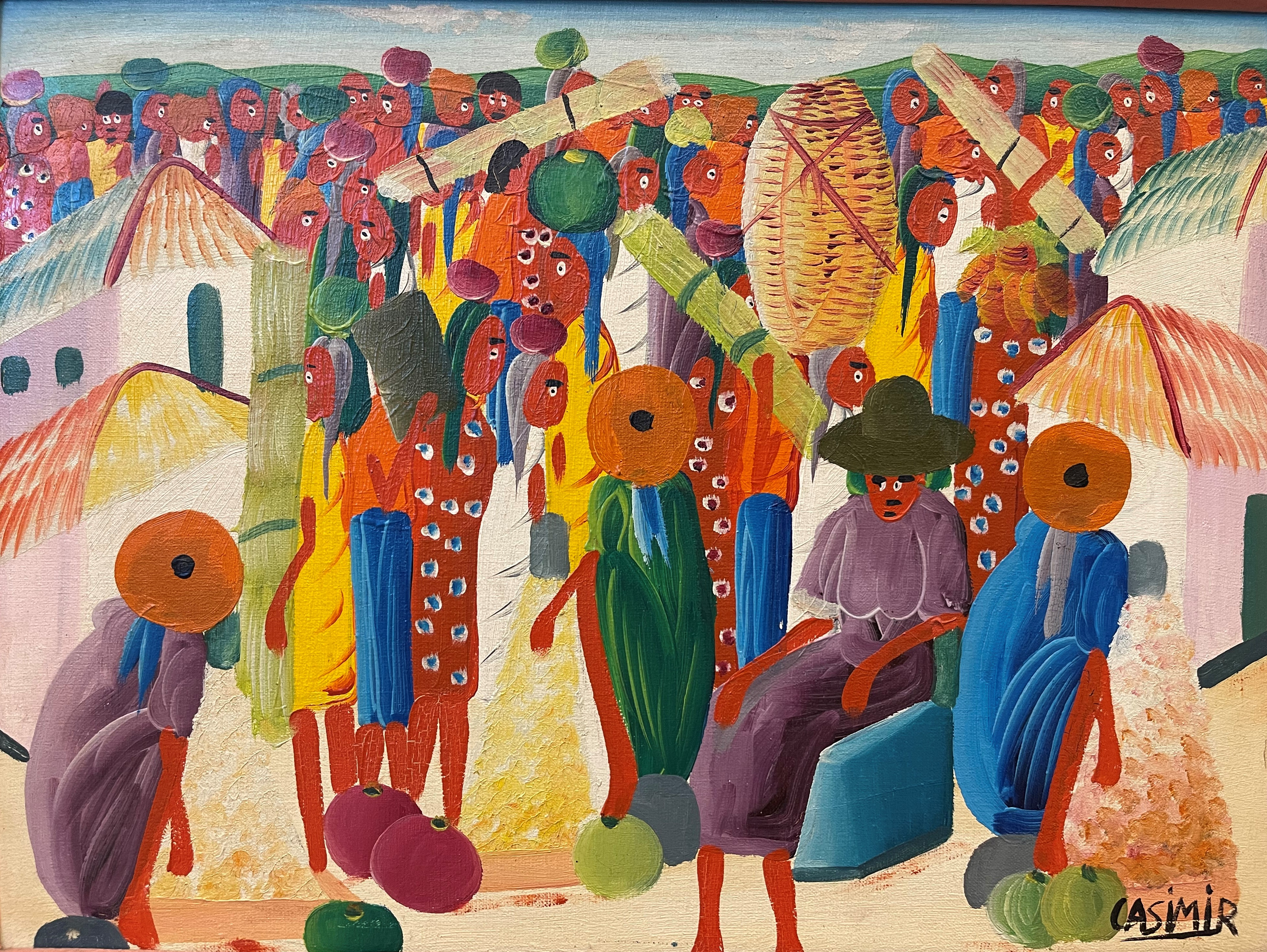
Laurent Casimir - Tržnica

Market painting is a Haitian archetype, originating with Laurent Casimir. It typically depicts a Haitian market and is done in the trademark colors of Casimir: red, yellow and orange. The motive is often dense with people. These paintings were mass-produced by Laurent Casimir and his apprentices in the mid-1970s, all signed by Casimir. This archetype is later taken up by contemporary Haitian artist like Jean-Louis, many of which studied under Laurent Casimir.

== Sculpture ==
There is evidence that sculpture from the Tainos in Haiti existed in the Pre-Columbian era and they would create dolls, drawings, signs. It is speculated by researchers that these sculptures may have been representing their deities (maybe the ancestors of the vèvè in vaudou).

Contemporary Haitian sculpture is made of natural materials, traditional art mediums, and recycled materials.

"Haitian Steel Drum Sculpture" – The village of Noailles in Croix-des-Bouquets is home to more than a dozen artisan workshops producing countless pieces for over two decades. The work is created out of recycled oil drums. In August 2011, the Clinton Global Initiative along with Greif Inc., donated 40 tons of scrap metal to the artists in Croix-des-Bouquets. After the earthquake in 2010, artists had a difficult time finding material to work from. According to deputy Jean Tholbert Alèxis, 8,000 people in the area are directly or indirectly benefit from the villages' artisans.

=== Haitian flag-making ===
Flags most often commemorate specific spirits or saints, but the 2010 Haiti earthquake has become a common subject of art flags. The use of sequins in these flags became prevalent in the 1940s, and many of today's flags cover the entire flag in colored sequins and beads. These flags are traded as art by dealers around the world.

== 2010 Haiti earthquake ==
On 12 January 2010 a devastating earthquake struck Port-au-Prince and its surrounding area and resulted in mass devastation. The Haitian art world suffered great losses in the earthquake. Museums and art galleries were extensively damaged, among them Port-au-Prince's main art museum, Centre d'Art, where many art works were destroyed. The collection at Collège Saint Pierre also was devastated, as was the collection of priceless murals in the Holy Trinity Cathedral. Some private art galleries were also severely damaged, including the Monnin Gallery in Pétion-Ville, and the Nader Art Gallery and Musée Nader in Port-au-Prince. The personal collection of Georges Nader Sr, the Nader collection was worth an estimated US$30-US$100 million. Shortly after the earthquake struck, UNESCO assigned special envoy Bernard Hadjadj to evaluate damage to artwork. The Smithsonian Institution, led by Under Secretary Richard Kurin, and with the assistance of the U.S. Embassy in Port-au-Prince and the Government of Haiti among others, embarked on a multiyear project and survey to help restore key Haitian cultural treasures and train local Haitians on art preservation and recovery techniques.
