= Wilson Bigaud =

Haitian painter

Cockfight by Wilson Bigaud

Wilson Bigaud (29 January 1931 – 22 March 2010) was a Haitian painter.

== Biography ==
Born in Port-au-Prince, Bigaud first worked with clay before becoming a painter.

At the age of 15, he was introduced to DeWitt Peters (who in 1944 founded the Centre d'Art in Port-au-Prince) by Hector Hyppolite. Peters suggested he turn his talents to painting. Thus Bigaud joined the Centre d'Art, and began to paint under the direction of Maurice Borno.

Early on, he demonstrated his abilities, by quickly assimilating innovations of a sophisticated painter (balance, movement, rhythm, pattern, contrast, unity and emphasis). Together with Jacques Enguerrand Gourgue, he belongs to a select group of artists who are more than just "naïve" and "primitive".

In 1950, at the age of 19, Bigaud won second place for a painting entitled Paradise, at an International Exhibition in Washington, D.C. In 1954, one of his engravings was presented in an exhibition at the Museum of Modern Art in New York (MoMA), and still features in the museum's collection, along with a painting titled Murder in the Jungle.

In 1951, together with Castera Bazile, Philomé Obin, Préfète Duffaut, Toussaint Auguste and Rigaud Benoit, Bigaud decorated the walls of the Holy Trinity Cathedral (destroyed during the 2010 earthquake) of Port-au-Prince, by painting murals. His contribution depicted the Marriage at Cana. These murals were some of the finest examples of Haitian art.

His works are usually realistic dramatizations of native life, and he is considered, as one of the major figures in Haitian painting.
