= Culture of the Caribbean =

Elements that are representative of Caribbean people

The term Caribbean culture summarizes the artistic, musical, literary, culinary, political and social elements that are representative of Caribbean people all over the world, influenced by waves of migration.

== History ==
=== The two ethnic cultures which are dominant in the music cultures of the English speaking Caribbean ===
Caribbean culture results from Caribbean history and geography. Most of the Caribbean territories were inhabited and developed earlier than European colonies (1492- ) in the Americas, with the result that themes and symbols of pioneers, farmers, traders and slaves became important in the early development of Caribbean culture. British conquests in the Caribbean in 1759 brought a Francophone population under British rule, requiring compromise and accommodation, while in the 1780s the migration of United Empire Loyalists from the Thirteen Colonies brought in strong British, Spanish, French, African and even Dutch influences.

Although not without conflict, the Caribbean's early interactions between incoming settlers and the indigenous populations were relatively short-lived, compared to the experience of native peoples in (say) the United States or Brazil. Combined with relatively late economic development in many regions, this difficult history has disallowed Caribbean native peoples from having any strong influence on emergent national cultures, even destroying their remaining identity.

Multicultural heritage is enshrined in many islands. In parts of the Caribbean, multiculturalism itself is the cultural norm and diversity is the force that unites the community. Although officially a quarter of the Caribbean population is English-speaking, the largest linguistic group comprises Spanish speakers (due to the inclusion of mainland Caribbean states), some 22% speak French while only 1% speak Dutch. Though the Caribbean today features 59 living languages these are not spoken in the "insular Caribbean", but on what is referred to as the "continental Caribbean".

In the French islands, cultural identity is strong, and many French-speaking islanders commentators speak of a French culture as distinguished from English Caribbean culture, but some also see the Caribbean as a collection of several regional, and ethnic subcultures.

While French Caribbean culture is the most obvious example, Spanish influences have allowed the survival of non-English dialects. The influence of Ulster immigrants to Barbados had the effect of minimizing Irish influences in the Caribbean's culture, and highlighting British influences instead, until the 1980s. The Caribbean's Pacific trade has also brought a large Chinese influence into Trinidad and other areas. The East Indians brought to Trinidad and Tobago, Guyana, Suriname, Jamaica, and other parts of the Caribbean indentured laborers to work on the sugarcane, rice, and cocoa estates brought with them the many languages of India and developed a lingua franca: Caribbean Hindustani.

==== Caribbean identity ====
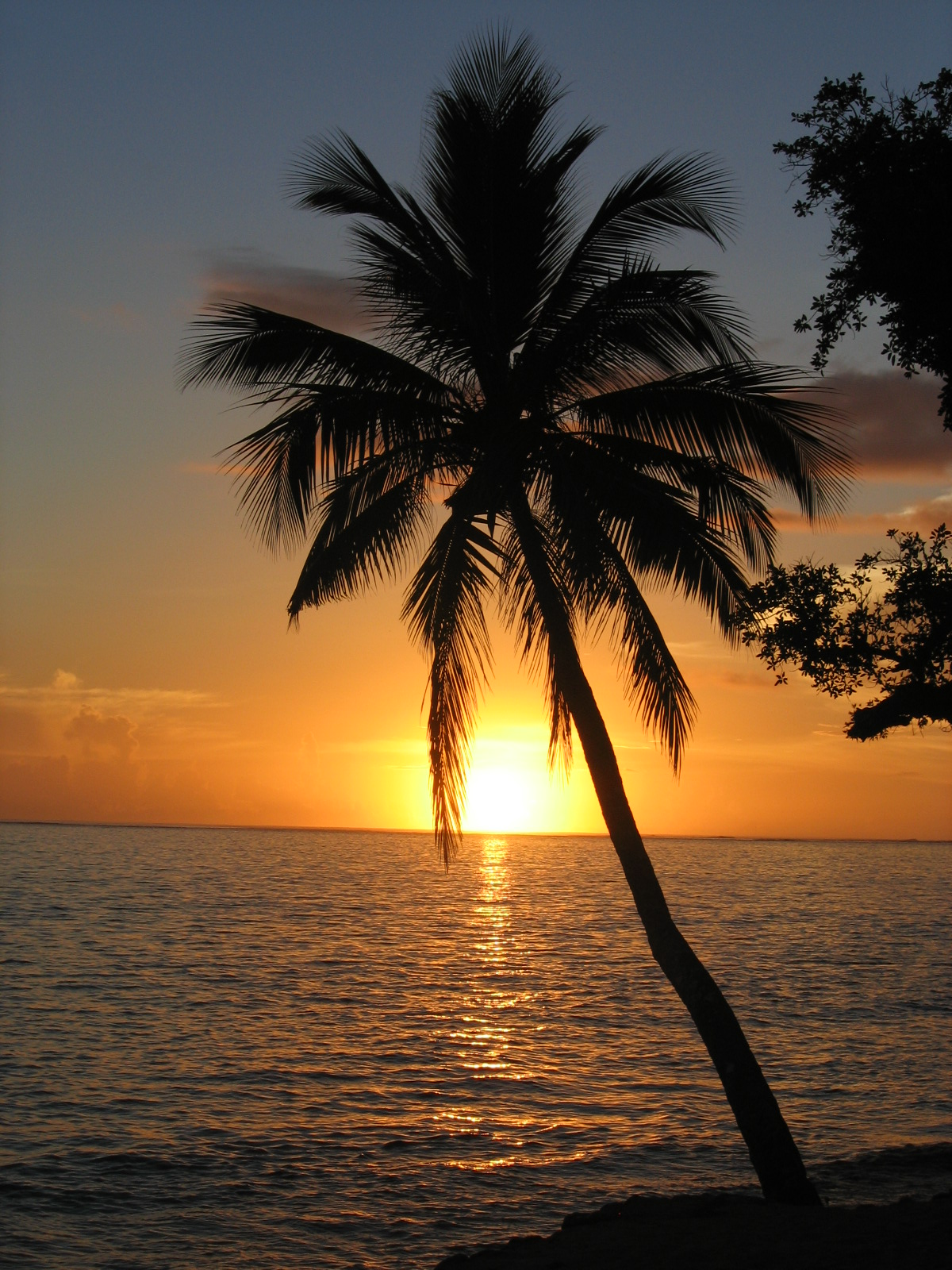
The palm is the symbol most associated with Caribbean identity.

Major influences on Caribbean identity trace back to the arrival of French settlers (from the early-17th century), English settlers (from the early-17th century) and Spanish settlers (from the late-15th century). Indigenous people played a critical part in the development of European colonies in Caribbean: they assisted in European exploration, in the development of the sugar trade and in inter-European power struggles, as well as contributing to the formation of the Afro-Caribbean people. Through their art and culture, indigenous Caribbean and African descendants continue to exert influence on the Caribbean identity or identities.

Along with the gradual loosening of the Caribbean's political and cultural ties to colonial metropoles, in the 20th century immigrants from European, African, Caribbean and Asian nationalities have shaped Caribbean identity, a process that continues today with the arrival of significant numbers of immigrants from non-British or non-French backgrounds, adding to multiculturalism. As of 2019 the Caribbean had a diverse makeup of nationalities and cultures and constitutional protection for policies that promote multiculturalism - rather than any single national myth.

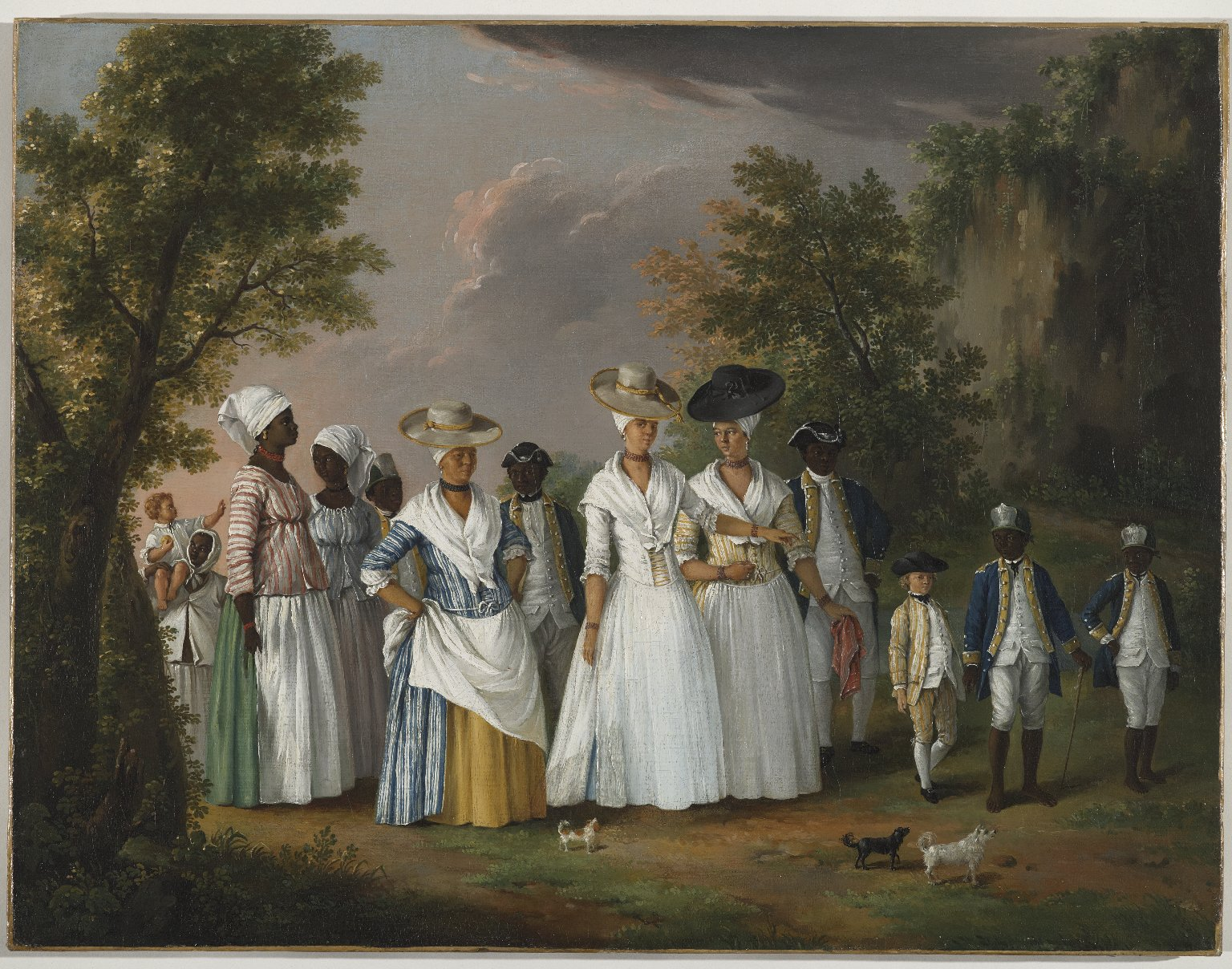
Agostino Brunias. Free Women of Color with Their Children and Servants in a Landscape, ca. 1770-1796 Brooklyn Museum

== Symbols ==
Official symbols of the Caribbean include the parrot, palm, and the shell. Many official symbols of the country such as the flags of the Caribbean have been changed or modified over the past years in order to "Caribbeanize" them and de-emphasize or remove references to the United Kingdom. For example, The Cayman Islands now uses National Symbols that include their indigenous Parrot, Silver Thatch, Palm and the Wild Banana Orchid.

== Arts ==
The works of most early Caribbean painters followed European trends. During the mid-1800s, Caribbean painters have developed a wide range of highly individual styles. The arts have flourished in Caribbean since the 1900s, and especially since the end of World War II in 1945.

The Washington Organizations of American States (inaugurated in 1976) houses one of the oldest 20th-century art collections representing the Caribbean. For example, one exhibit showcased works included two important pieces by women artists of the Caribbean: El vendedor de andullo (Tobacco Vendor), 1938, by modernist Celeste Woss y Gil of the Dominican Republic, and an oil painting entitled Marpacífico (Hibiscus-Marpacífico is the name used in Cuba for the hibiscus flower), 1943, by Cuban modernist Amelia Peláez. There have even been a rare selection of prints by Haitian artists such as Castera Bazile, Wilson Bigaud, Dieudonné Cedor, Jacques-Enguerrand Gourgue and Gabriel Lévêque, that have not been exhibited since they were part of a traveling exhibition in 1948.

=== Literature ===
Caribbean literature, whether written in English, French, Spanish, or a creole language, often reflects a Caribbean perspective on nature, life, and the region's position in the world. Caribbean identity is closely tied to its literature. Caribbean literature is often categorized by region or island; by the status of the author (e.g., literature of Caribbean women, Europeans, Asian peoples, and Irish Caribbeans); and by literary period, such as "Caribbean postmodern" or "Caribbean Poets Between the Wars". The East Indians have preserved their Indian literature and brought religious Hindu texts such as the Itihasa (Ramayana, Mahabharta, Bhagavad Gita), Vedas, Puranas, Upanishads, Tirumurai, Naalayira Divya Prabhandham, Shastras, Sutras. The Sikhs also brought their Guru Granth Sahib with them. The Muslims also brought their Quran with them.

Caribbean authors have won numerous awards. Mark McWatt won Best First Book Award (2006) and Commonwealth Writers' Prize for Suspended Sentences: Fictions of Atonement. Sir V. S. Naipaul won the Man Booker Prize (1971), the Trinity Cross of Trinidad and Tobago, and the Nobel Prize in Literature (2001). Derek Walcott also won the Nobel Prize (1992).

A selection of poetry and fiction produced in the Caribbean during the 19th and 20th centuries and be searched at "Caribbean Literature".

The Caribbean Literature Day is celebrated annually on July 12, in the Caribbean region, across all language zones, and by Caribbean literature lovers worldwide.

=== Carnival ===
The annual celebration of carnival is an important part of Caribbean culture. Traditionally, most Caribbean islands celebrate carnival on Ash Wednesday or the days leading up to Lent. Barbados celebrates the delivery of the last Sugar Canes called 'Crop Over' better known as the 'Sweetest Summer Festival' which is held in August.

=== Music ===
The music of the Caribbean reflects the multi-cultural influences that have shaped the Caribbean and these are mainly African. The first historical figures to influence Caribbean musicians were from the South Americas and to some degree Africa. Nevertheless, the Caribbean's first peoples, the East Indias, the Chinese, the Arabs, the Jews, the Spanish, the French, the British, the Portuguese, the Danish, the Dutch, Germans, and the Italians have all made large contributions to the musical heritage of the Caribbean as well. Since Italian explorer Columbus arrived and established the permanent colonies, the islands have produced their own composers, musicians and ensembles. From the 17th century onwards, the Caribbean has developed a music infrastructure that includes church halls, performing arts centers, record companies, radio stations and television music video channels. The music has subsequently been heavily influenced by American culture because of its proximity and migration between the two regions.

The Caribbean has produced a variety of internationally successful performers and artists. These individuals are honoured at The Awards, recognizing Caribbean achievement in popular music. In addition, the Caribbean is home to a number of popular summertime folk festivals. The Caribbean has also produced many notable composers, who have contributed in a variety of ways to the history of Western classical music.

The Caribbean is home to the Indo-Caribbean musical form of Chutney. It was created in Trinidad and Tobago by Sundar Popo. The Caribbean is also home to the Indo-Caribbean musical form of Baithak Gana that originated in Suriname.

There are the Anthony N Sabga Caribbean Awards for Excellence (ANSCAFE) launched in October 2005 to awards in the Arts (and other areas). Up to 2010, they were made biennially, but as of 2011, the awards will be made yearly in ceremonies in Trinidad. Linden Forbes Sampson Burnham (late President of Guyana) facilitated the first Caribbean Festival of the Arts (CARIFESTA) in 1972 in Georgetown, Guyana.

=== Caribbean theatre ===
The Caribbean has a thriving stage theatre scene. Judy Stone writes: "In addition to the conventional drama of social realism and the yard theatre, the range includes popular farce and roots theatre, musical folk theatre, pantomime, community theatre, Jamaica's Gun Court theatre, political theatre, church theatre, children's theatre, storytelling, the street theatre of Carnival and carnival theatre, calypso theatre, theatre of ritual, and the poetic theatre of St Lucia's Derek Walcott. There is also a considerable body of dramatic work written for film, television and radio. Cuba, in particular, has a comparatively vibrant film industry." Theatre festivals draw many tourists in the tourist months. As an example - Ruprecht argues that Creole Theatre would take one on a tour to a chain of islands in the Caribbean, and he offers an analysis of the contemporary Creole theatre of the Caribbean and of the work of some of the playwrights associated with Creole theatre, such as Frankétienne and Cavé in Haiti, José Exélis and Arthur Lérus in Guadeloupe, as well as Boukman and Placoly of Martinique. The Trinidad Theatre Workshop (established in 1959).

=== Film and television ===
The Caribbean film market was dominated by the American film industry for decades, although that film industry has since inception seen a prominent role for actors, directors, producers and technicians of Caribbean origin. Filmmakers from the Caribbean began to challenge Hollywood by making innovative and relevant documentary, dramas and feature films.

Some Caribbean islands have developed a small but vigorous film industry that has produced a variety of well-known films, actors, and auteurs. Also, the distinct French-Caribbean and Spanish-Caribbean society permits the work of directors to contribute very different film-forms. Some have become the Caribbean's first films to win the Award for Best Foreign Language Film. Many Caribbean people are employed in the film industry, and celebrity-spotting is frequent throughout many Caribbean cities.

Caribbean television, especially supported by the Caribbean Broadcasting Corporation, is the home of a variety of locally produced shows. French- and Spanish-language television, is buffered from excessive American influence by the fact of language, and likewise supports a host of home-grown productions. The success of French and Spanish-language domestic television and movies in Caribbean often exceeds that of its English-language counterpart. Caribbean Media Awards honor the best feature broadcast placements, print and photography from Caribbean-based media outlets.

=== Architecture ===
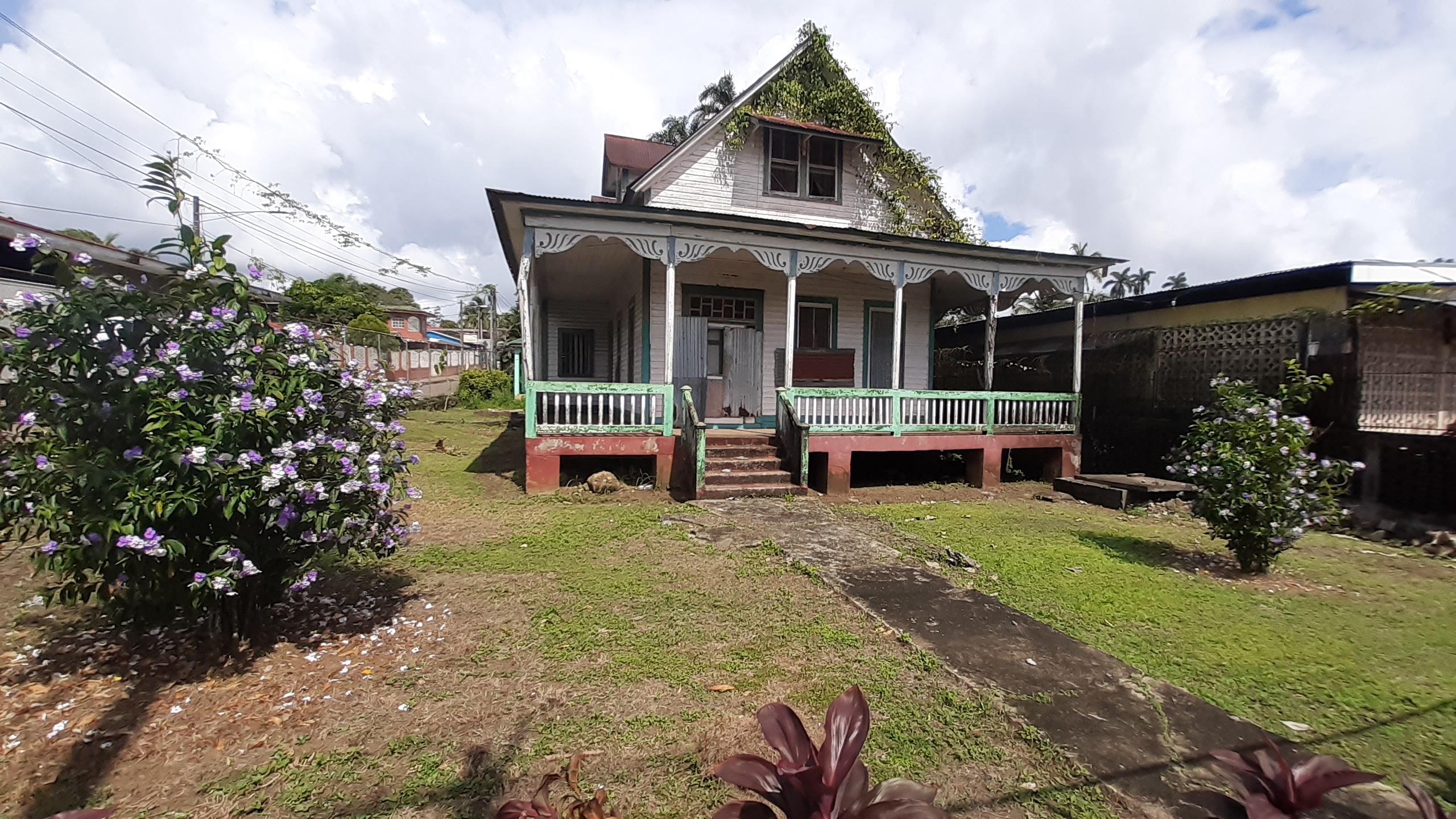
A typical traditional house in Bluefields, Nicaragua

Caribbean vernacular architecture exhibits a blend of African, European, and Indigenous architectural influences considering the history of the region. Homes are typically constructed from locally available materials like thatch, bamboo, or even mud. These houses are often constructed with steeply pitched roofs and deep overhangs to guard against the region's notoriously heavy rains and strong winds. Large, open verandas are also a frequent trait of Caribbean homes, taking advantage of cooling breezes in a region with a lot of heat and humidity. To mitigate against the impact of hurricanes, low, rectangular designs are favoured to withstand the winds. Shutters are also frequently fixed to windows.

== Caribbean humor ==
Caribbean humor is an integral part of the Caribbean identity. There are several traditions in Caribbean humor in English, Spanish and French. While these traditions are distinct and at times very different, there are common themes that relate to Caribbeans' shared history and geopolitical situation in North America and the world. Various trends can be noted in Caribbean comedy. One trend is the portrayal of a "typical" Caribbean family in an ongoing radio or television series. Examples include a mix of drama, humor, politics, religion, and sitcoms. Another major trend tends to be political and cultural satire: television shows such as Royal Palm Estate, monologists and writers, draw their inspiration from Caribbean society and politics. Another trend revels in absurdity and musician-comedians. Satire is arguably the primary characteristic of Caribbean humor, evident in each of these threads, and uniting various genres and regional cultural differences. Caribbean humor has taken on a modern interpretation, due to the advent of social media and the rise of many popular comedians that hail from the Caribbean and the Caribbean diaspora.

In 1957, mento artist Lord Flea stated that: "West Indians have the best sense of humor in the world. Even the most solemn song, like 'Las Kean Fine' ('Lost and Can Not Be Found'), which tells of a boiler explosion on a sugar plantation that killed several of the workers, their natural wit and humor shine though."

== Sport ==
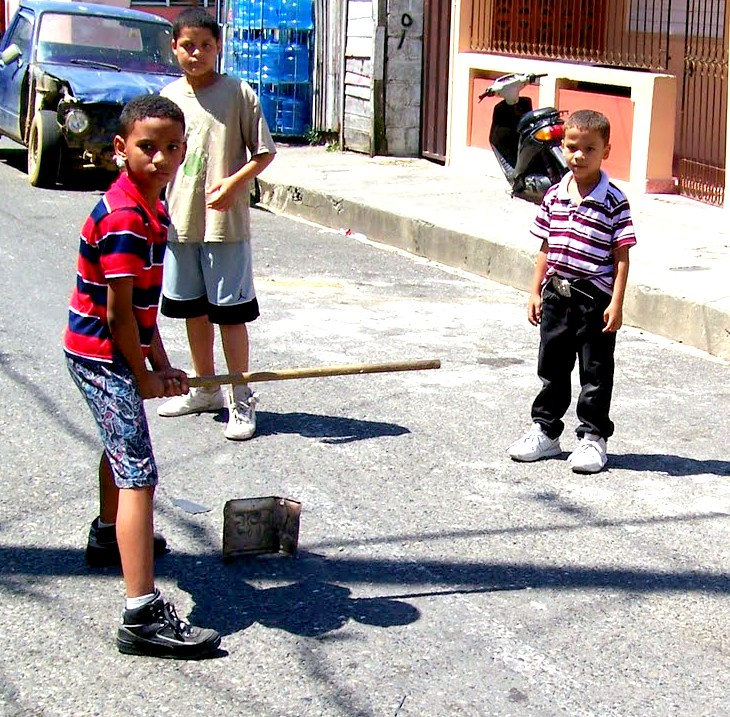
Plaquita, a Dominican street version of cricket. The Dominican Republic was first introduced to cricket through mid-18th century British contact, but switched to baseball after the 1916 American occupation.

Cricket is a very popular sport in the countries and dependencies that formed the British West Indies. The West Indies cricket team competes in Test matches, One Day Internationals and Twenty20 Internationals. The West Indies' major domestic competitions are the Regional Four Day Competition (first-class) and the Regional Super50 (List A one-day) and more recently the Caribbean Premier League (Twenty20).

The regional football governing body is the Caribbean Football Union. National teams have competed in the CFU Championship from 1978 to 1988 and the Caribbean Cup since 1989. The top 4 teams in the tournament qualify for the CONCACAF Gold Cup. Cuba qualified to the FIFA World Cup in 1938, Haiti in 1974, Jamaica in 1998 and Trinidad and Tobago in 2006.

The CFU Club Championship is the regional tournament for football clubs. The winner qualified for the CONCACAF Champions' Cup from 1997 until 2008. Since 2008–09, the top 3 clubs qualify for a preliminary round of the CONCACAF Champions League.

However, the most popular sport in Cuba, Dominican Republic, Puerto Rico, Aruba and Curaçao is baseball. The Caribbean Series, held since 1949, features the national champions from the top Caribbean leagues. The Cuba national team has claimed the Baseball World Cup 25 times, whereas the Dominican Republic won the 2013 World Baseball Classic. In the Pan American Games, Cuba has won 12 editions and Dominican Republic once, whereas Puerto Rico earned the silver medal twice. In the Central American and Caribbean Games, Cuba has won 15 gold medals, whereas Dominican Republic has won three and Puerto Rico two. Several Caribbean players have joined the Major League Baseball: in the 2014 there were 82 Dominicans, 19 Cubans and 11 Puerto Ricans. Notable Caribbean players are Juan Marichal, Pedro Martínez, Roberto Clemente, Orlando Cepeda and Roberto Alomar.

The Puerto Rico men's national basketball team finished fourth in the 1990 FIBA World Championship and won three FIBA Americas Championships and two Pan American Games. Meanwhile, the Cuba women's national basketball team finished third in the 1990 FIBA World Championship for Women and won three FIBA Americas Championships and three Pan American Games.

Other popular team sports in the Caribbean include rugby union and softball. Popular individual sports include auto racing, boxing, cycling, golf, hiking, horse racing, skateboarding, swimming, tennis, triathlon, track and field, water sports, and wrestling.

Cuba ranks second in Olympic boxing and fifth in judo, whereas Jamaica has been a power in Olympic sprint running. At the Pan American Games, Cuba ranks second in the medal table, Dominican Republic ranks 10th, Puerto Rico 11th and Jamaica 13th. At the Central American and Caribbean Games, Cuba ranks first, Puerto Rico fifth, Dominican Republic sixth, Jamaica seventh and Trinidad and Tobago 11th.

The 1966 British Empire and Commonwealth Games were held in Kingston, Jamaica.

As an area with a generally warm climate, the Caribbean countries have enjoyed greater success at the Summer Olympics than at the Winter Olympics. However, the Jamaica national bobsleigh team has qualified to the Winter Olympic Games since 1988. Other notable Caribbean competitors at the Winter Games are Erroll Fraser, Dow Travers, George Tucker and Anne Abernathy.

The Caribbean Awards Sports Icons (CASI) are based on accomplishments made over the last 60 years (1948–2008), for those who have made their mark in the various fields of sports. Great achievements in Caribbean sport are recognized by Caribbean's Sports Hall of Fame, while trophies are awarded annually to top athletes by a panel of journalists.

== Food ==
Popular dishes in the Caribbean reflect the cultures that have influenced the region - Indigenous, African, European, Indian and Chinese. One dish common to many Caribbean countries is pelau, a mixture of saltfish, beef, rice and peas, pigeon peas, and other vegetables. A prominent African-influenced Caribbean dish, callaloo, combines leafy greens with okra.
