= 2015 Haiti Carnival stampede =

Human stampede at a Mardi Gras parade in Haiti

- Date: February 17, 2015
- Time: 2:48 AM
- Location: Champ de Mars, Port-au-Prince, Haiti
- Deaths: 18 (15 men + 3 women)
- Injuries: 78

External videos
- Video hosted on YouTube

On February 17, 2015, starting at around 2:48 AM, a stampede occurred during the traditional Mardi Gras parade on Champ de Mars in the Haitian capital Port-au-Prince. Initial reports stated that at least 16 people had died in the accident. The number was revised to 18 dead (15 men and 3 women) according to the Haitian Minister of Communications, Rotchild François Junior. Nadia Lochard, of the Department of Civil Protection, stated that 20 people were killed in the accident. In addition, 78 people were injured, according to Haiti Prime Minister Evans Paul.

The stampede occurred after a man participating on top of a Carnival float during the Mardi Gras was shocked by high-voltage wires. Video footage of the incident shows visible sparks that triggered the stampede. The man, known by his stage name Fantom, and part of the Haitian hip hop band Barikad Crew, survived the shock and was in stable condition.

== Reactions ==
Prime Minister Paul declared three days of official mourning for Haiti in response to the accident, and government officials announced a state funeral and vigil for the victims, which was held on February 21, 2015. Paul also said that a silent parade would be held along the Champ de Mars, where the accident occurred. Michel Martelly, the President of Haiti, expressed his "sincerest sympathies" for the victims. After the accident, Minister of Communications François Junior said that the government will organize a plan to modernize the state electricity company, Electricité d’Haïti.

== See also ==
- Citadelle Laferrière crowd crush
