= Seley =

Seley is a surname, and may refer to:

- Clara Seley (1905–2003) Russian Empire-born American visual artist
- James Harold Seley (1906–1994) American businessman
- Jason Seley (1919–1983) American sculptor, educator, and academic administrator
- Katherine Seley-Radtke American medicinal chemist
- Sezen Aksu (born 1954), also known as Sezen Seley, Turkish singer, songwriter, and music producer

== See also ==
- Soley
