= Andrée Malebranche =

Haitian artist (1916–2013)

- Born: 28 November 1916; Port-au-Prince, Haiti
- Died: 13 February 2013 (aged 96); Port-au-Prince, Haiti
- Occupation: artist
- Years active: 1941–1960

Andrée Malebranche (28 November 1916 – 13 February 2013) was an Afro-Haitian painter and art instructor. She has works included in the collections of the Musée d'Art Haïtien and was recognized by the Haitian government for her contributions to the development of Haitian painting.

== Early life ==
Andrée Malebranche was born on 28 November 1916 in Port-au-Prince, Haiti, to Clio (née Lemaire) and Lelio Malebranche. Growing up in an affluent family, her desire to work as an artist was an unusual path for the times, but from a young age, Malebranche wanted to learn painting. During her childhood, the United States occupied Haiti, which had a profound effect on her desire overcome the suppression of her African and Haitian heritage. After completing her primary education in private schools, she attended the École Normal and graduated in 1938. As her father was appointed as the Haitian envoy to Cuba, Malebranche continued her studies at the Ciriulo da Bella Artes in Havana, obtaining her baccalauréat in 1941.

== Career ==
The year that she graduated, Malebranche held her first exhibition in Port-au-Prince and the following year, exhibited in Vedado at the Lyceum and Lawn Tennis Club. The international exhibit was one of the first to feature a Haitian woman's work outside of the country. One of the co-founders, along with Maurice Borno, Albert Mangonès, Lucien Price, and Georges Remponeau, of the Centre d’Art d'Haïti, Malebranche taught painting and drawing at the Centre beginning in 1944. In 1947, she had her first exhibit in the United States, exhibiting at the 44th Street Gallery in New York City.

In 1945, commissioned with Gérald Bloncourt and James Peterson through the Centre d’Art, Malebranche created murals for the chapel of Sainte-Marie-Thérèse in Pétion-Ville. These were some of the first murals created in Haiti. In her mural, Holy Family, she depicted the family as Haitian peasants, making a black Madonna, Joseph and the Christ Child. When the curate of the chapel was replaced, Rev. Poirier ordered the painting destroyed in 1960 because he felt it showed inappropriate references to race and class. Other of her works featured black and indigenous women from Cuba and Mexico, presenting an honest depiction of the human condition and difficulty of their lives. She avoided colorful exotic scenes of markets and musicians, voodoo or heroic icons, instead focusing on the lives of poverty stricken peasants or urban poor women. Her palette was often subdued shades of grays and browns with dark backgrounds, in which the figures melted into the blackness.

Like many women artists, Malebranche struggled to achieve recognition and like other women in her period were omitted from books discussing Haitian art. Because socially, there were perceptions that women should remain in the home, she had to develop unique venues to show her art, exhibiting in places like dress shops, rather than art galleries. Throughout her career, Malebranche exhibited works in Brazil, France, Mexico, and the United States. Most of her works went into private collections, though she has paintings in the permanent collection of the Musée d'Art Haïtien. In 2007, the Ministry of the Condition of Women of Haiti presented her with a plaque in recognition of her contributions to the development of painting in Haiti. Two years later, she was recognized with "honor and merit" by the government.

== Death and legacy ==
Malebranche died on 13 February 2013 at her home in La Boule, a suburb of Port-au-Prince and her funeral was held in Pétion-Ville on 20 February. She is remembered as one of the pioneering women artists in Haiti and was honored in 2016 among other women artists at the Feminist Festival Nègès Mawon.
