= Hermithe Hyppolite =

Haitian art figure (1916–2007)

- Born: c. 1916; Haiti
- Died: 5 June 2007 (aged 90–91); Port-au-Prince, Haiti
- Occupations: Figure in modern Haitian art scene; domestic worker
- Spouse: Rigaud Benoit (m. 1940; died 1986)
- Children: Four, including Fils Rigaud Benoit, Castelneau Benoit, Yves Lafontant (adopted), and Jacques Dorcé (adopted)
- Parent: Hector Hyppolite (father)

Hermithe Hyppolite (also referred under first name spellings of Hermite, Herminthe, Ermite, or last names Hypolite, Hyppolyte, or Hypolyte; c. 1916 – 5 June 2007), was a figure within the mid-20th-century Haitian art movement in Port-au-Prince. Hyppolite played a supportive role in the early development of the modern Haitian art movement. She was a member of two influential families of Haitian artists as the daughter of painter Hector Hyppolite and the spouse of painter Rigaud Benoit. Together with Benoit, she raised and mentored four painters in the modern Haitian art scene, including Fils Rigaud Benoit, Castelneau Benoit, Yves Lafontant, and Jacques Dorcé.

== Early life ==
Hyppolite was born in Haiti around 1916 to the artist Hector Hyppolite. Her father, a third-generation Vodou priest, became a key figure in the Haitian art scene, but prior to that apprenticed as a cobbler, worked as an innkeeper, and also worked as a painter, painting homes and doors.

She was identified as the only daughter of his for whom there is a documented birth record. However, scholars have noted a chronological discrepancy with her birth year as her father reportedly resided in Cuba from 1909 until 1920. Her father and mother never officially married, which her father attributed to his spiritual devotion to the Voudou deities, in particular the Siren (La Sirèn). Her father was vocal about his rejection of secular marriage and his mystical marriages with the lwa the Siren, the Vodou goddess of the sea as well as the lwa Erzulie Dantor.

She may have been mentioned in an interview her father gave to Selden Rodman:

I have several children outside, but they're all grown up now; they're big and they're ambitious and they're just waiting for me to die so they can inherit from me. But my new baby, ah, she's different. I shall bring her up in my own way. Her name signifies love. So when she's a grown woman and a man calls her by her name, he will be saying to her: You are my love.

Her father may have been speaking directly about Hermite Hyppolite as his biological descendant. However, it is possible that he was speaking about his initiates (ounsi) as his children, metaphorically describing himself as a parent of love, or referring to an attribute of one of the lwa, such as Erzulie Freda.

== Career and legacy ==
She married Rigaud Benoit, who was a close friend of her father.In the early years of Benoit's career, before he gained international acclaim, Hyppolite provided financial stability for the household by doing washing in their neighbourhood near Grand Rue, so that Benoit could pursue art.

With Benoit, she raised four children who became artists of the modern Haitian art movement. Hyppolite and Benoit had two biological children together: Fils Rigaud Benoit and Castelneau Benoit, both of whom became painters. The couple adopted and mentored Yves Lafontant and Jacques Dorcé, who also became artists in their own right.

Hyppolite died in Port-au-Prince on 5 June 2007.
