= Citadelle Laferrière crowd crush =

Crowd crush at a historical fortress in Haiti

- Date: 11 April 2026
- Location: Citadelle Laferrière, Milot, Acul-du-Nord, Nord, Haiti; 19°34′22.3″N 72°14′36.4″W
- Type: Crowd crush
- Cause: Crowd surge during a tourist event celebrating Haitian Independence Day
- Deaths: 25–30
- Injuries: dozens

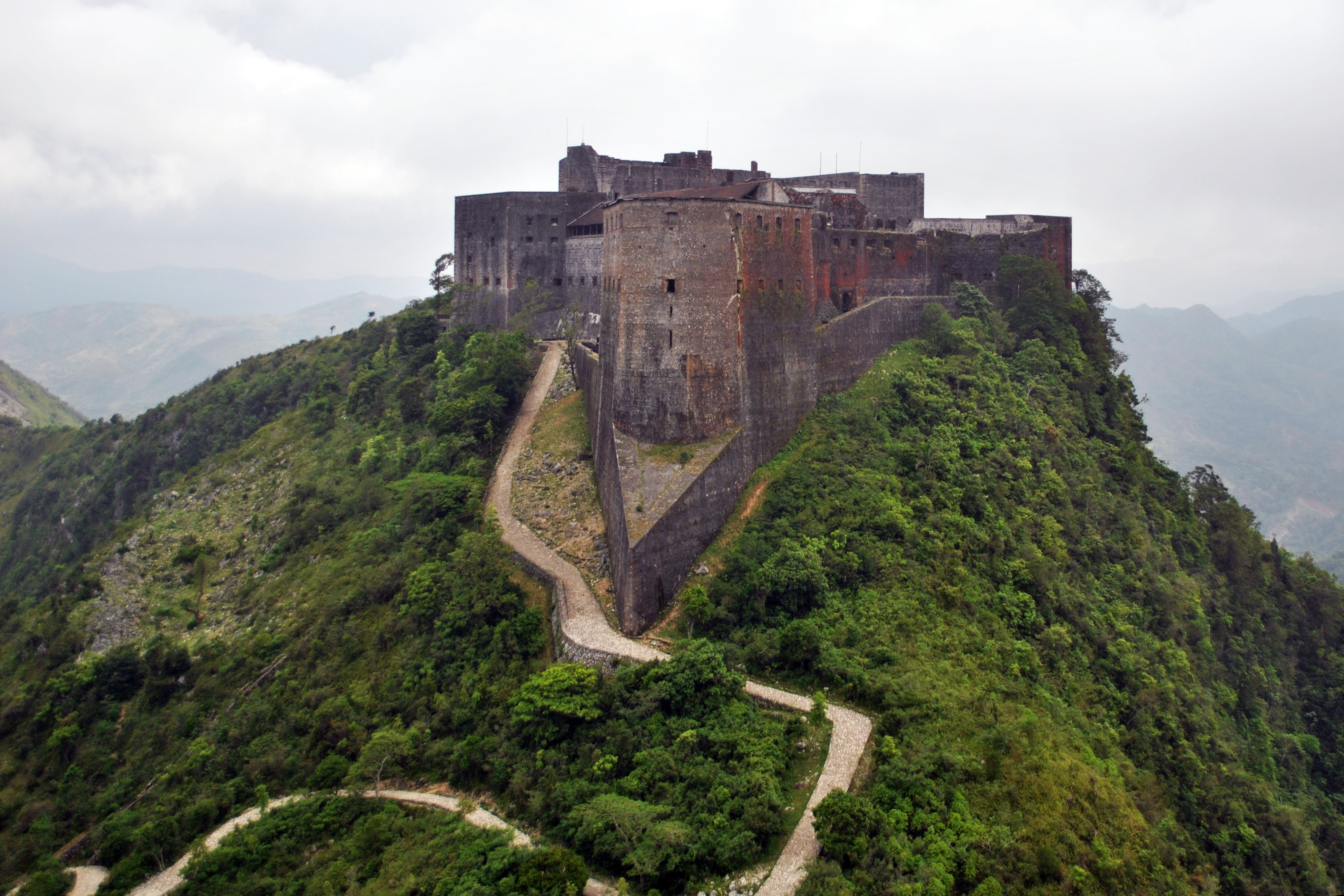
Citadelle Laferrière aerial view

On 11 April 2026, a crowd surge during an annual event celebrating Haitian Independence Day near the entrance of the historical fortress and World Heritage Site Citadelle Laferrière killed at least 25 people and injured dozens more.

== Background ==
The Citadelle Laferrière, also known as La Citadelle, is a 19th-century fortress on a mountaintop in Nord, Haiti. It was completed in 1820 by tens of thousands of black slaves after gaining their freedom from France as a commission for Haitian revolutionary Henri Christophe. UNESCO designated the area as a World Heritage Site 1982 as National History Park – Citadel, Sans Souci, Ramiers.

The deadliest similar incident in Haiti in recent years was the 2015 Haiti Carnival stampede, where at least 17 people died and 78 more were injured at a midnight Mardi Gras festival in Port-au-Prince after a power line fell on one of the parade floats.

== Disaster ==
Independence Day and Easter celebrations are held annually in the area, as it is one of the most popular tourist spots in Haiti. According to the local departmental director of Civil Protection, attendance at the festival was significantly higher than typical amounts. The crowd crush likely resulted from a bottleneck at the sole entrance, as well as mass panic and poor crowd management, resulting in cases ranging from asphyxiation to loss of consciousness at the entrance. Police in Milot commune used tear gas to disperse opposing crowds, which may have caused the crowd crush.

== Aftermath ==
Figures from the Haitian National Police and the Associated Press said that at least 25 people had been killed and around 30 more were injured, though initial estimates suggested a death toll of at least 30. Many young people, including students and visitors, were physically present at the time, according to the Prime Minister of Haiti, Alix Didier Fils-Aimé, who also expressed grievances for the victims' families. Rescue missions are ongoing for those unaccounted, with the toll expected to rise in the following days, according to a local Haitian news source. The heritage site was closed to visitors until "further notice"

Fils-Aimé also declared three days of national mourning for the victims of the disaster, starting on 14 April. A director of the Institut de Sauvegarde du Patrimoine National (INSPAN) and a director of the Ministry of Culture and Communication were dismissed on charges of "serious negligence" and "biased passivity" over the disaster. Seven people, including five police officers and two INSPAN employees, were arrested on similar charges. The mayor of Milot later said that local authorities were not informed of an occasion at the site, and that announcements for the event were made by a DJ through TikTok.

== See also ==
- 2015 Haiti Carnival stampede
- 2019 Antananarivo crush
- Sanaa crowd crush
