= Turnier =

Turnier is a surname. Notable people with the surname include:

- Alain Turnier (died 1991), Haitian historian
- Luce Turnier (1924–1994), Haitian painter and collage artist
- Mathias Le Turnier (born 1995), French cyclist

== See also ==
- Turner (surname)
