= Micius (disambiguation) =

Micius is the Latinized name for Mozi, a Chinese political philosopher and religious reformer of the Warring States period

Micius may also refer to:

- Micius (satellite), a joint Austrian-Chinese satellite deployed as part of the Quantum Experiments at Space Scale (QUESS)
- The Micius Quantum Prize, an annual prize awarded for promoting research in quantum information science and technology
- Micius Stephane (1912–2012) Haitian painter
