= Malebranche =

Malebranche may refer to:

- Andrée Malebranche (1916–2013), Haitian artist
- David Malebranche (born 1969), Haitian-American physician
- Hélène Mallebrancke (1902–1940), Belgian civil engineer, member of Belgian Resistance during the Second World War
- Nicolas Malebranche (1638–1715), French philosopher
- Malebranche (Divine Comedy), demons in the Dante's Inferno
