= Le Marron Inconnu =

Bronze statue in Port-au-prince, Haiti

Le Marron Inconnu (Nèg Mawon) The Unknown Maroon (Maroon Man)
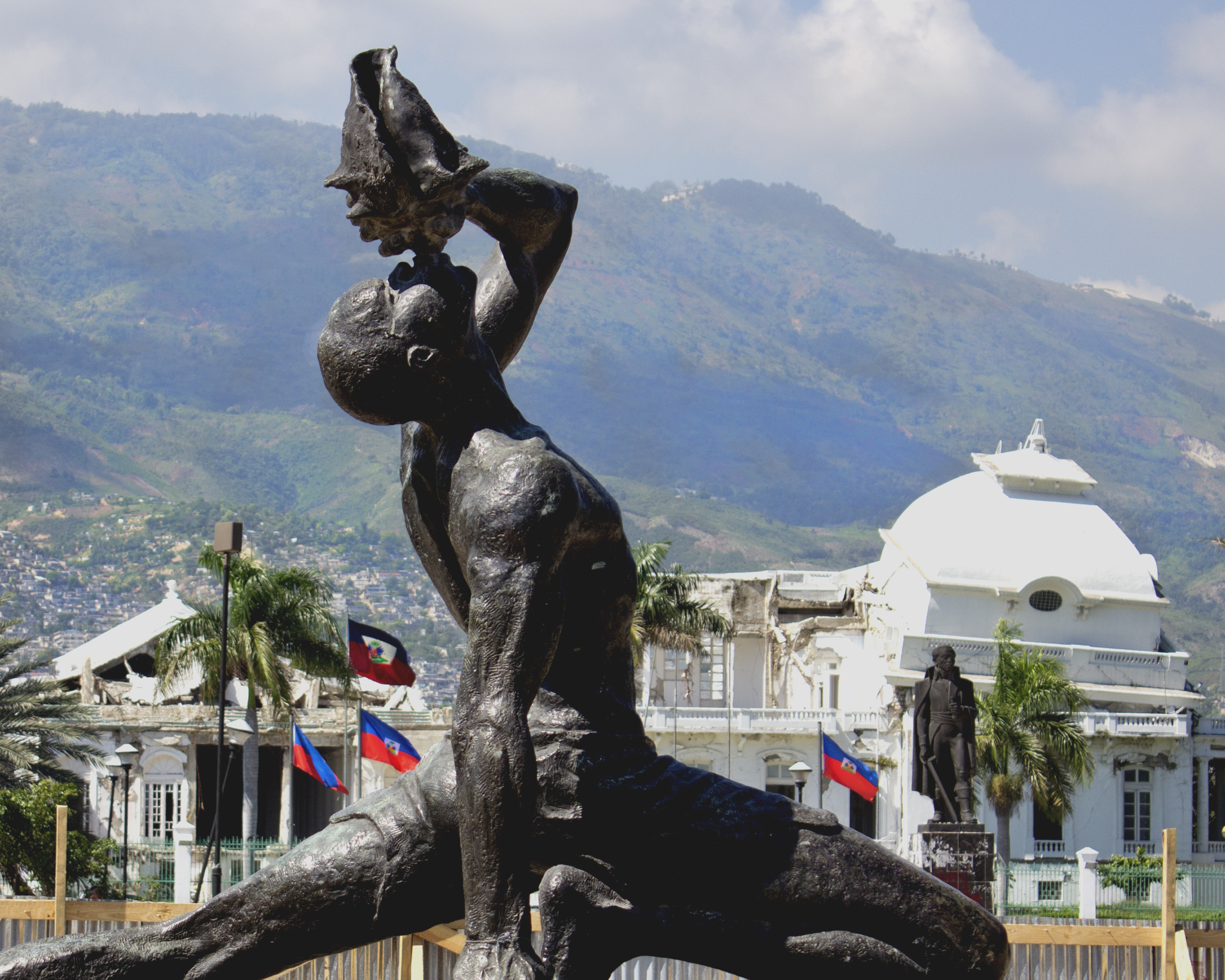
- Interactive map of Le Marron Inconnu (Nèg Mawon); The Unknown Maroon (Maroon Man)
- Location: Place du Marron Inconnu, Champ de Mars, HT6110 Port-au-Prince, Haiti
- Coordinates: 18.5446°N 72.3377°W
- Designer: Created by Haitian sculptor Albert Mangonès
- Height: 3.60 metres (11.8 ft) and 2.40 metres (7.9 ft) tall
- Completion date: 22 September 1967
- Dedicated to: Abolishment of slavery and freedom of all black people

Le Marron Inconnu de Port au prince, shortened as Le Marron Inconnu (French pronunciation: [lə ma.ʁɔ̃ ɛ̃.kɔ.ny], "The Unknown Maroon"), also called Neg Marron or Nèg Mawon (Haitian Creole pronunciation: [nɛɡ ma.ʁɔ̃], "Maroon Man"), is a bronze statue of a runaway slave, better known as a maroon, standing in the center of Port-au-Prince, Haiti. Completed on September 22, 1967 by Haitian architect Albert Mangonès, the statue is regarded as a symbol of black liberation; commemorating in particular, the rallying cry that sparked the Haitian Revolution and the abolishment of slavery. Situated across from the National Palace, it is the nation's most iconic representation of the struggle for freedom.

== Description ==
Mangonès completed the statue on 22 September 1967. It measures 3.60 metres long by 2.40 metres high. It depicts in bronze a near-naked fugitive black man, kneeling on one knee, his torso arched, his opposite leg stretched back, and a broken chain on his left ankle. He holds a conch shell at his lips with his left hand, his head tilted upward to blow it, while the other hand holds a machete on the ground by his right ankle.

Mangonès chose a passage from 1 Maccabees 14:3-9 of the Jerusalem Bible to be set in copper letters on one of the two concrete panels that protect the "eternal flame" of freedom in the square surrounding the statue.

== Recognized usage ==
In 1989, the United Nations adopted the statue as a central icon on postage stamps commemorating Article 4 of the Universal Declaration of Human Rights that states, "No one shall be held in slavery or servitude; slavery and the slave trade shall be prohibited in all their forms."

== Gallery ==
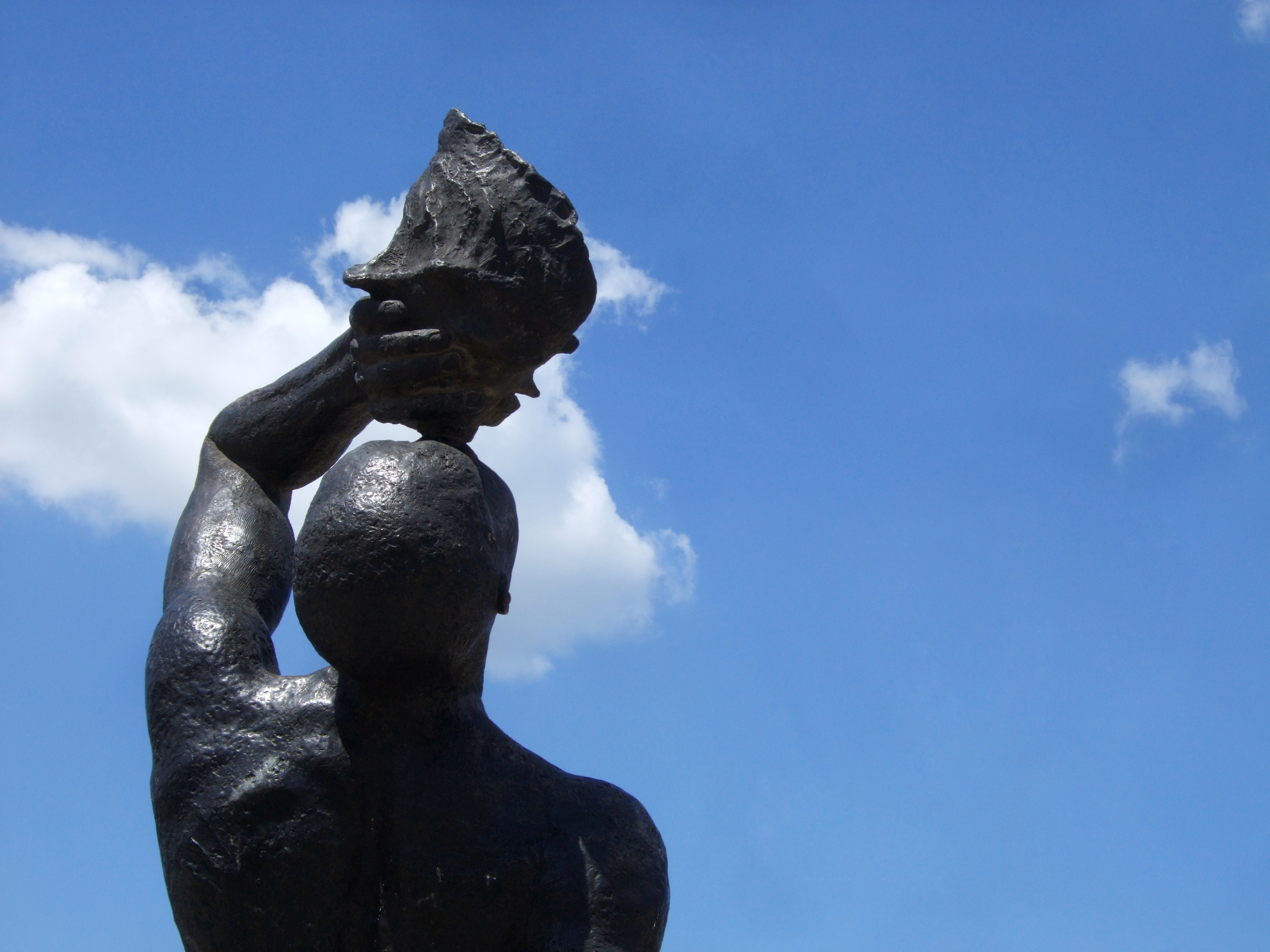

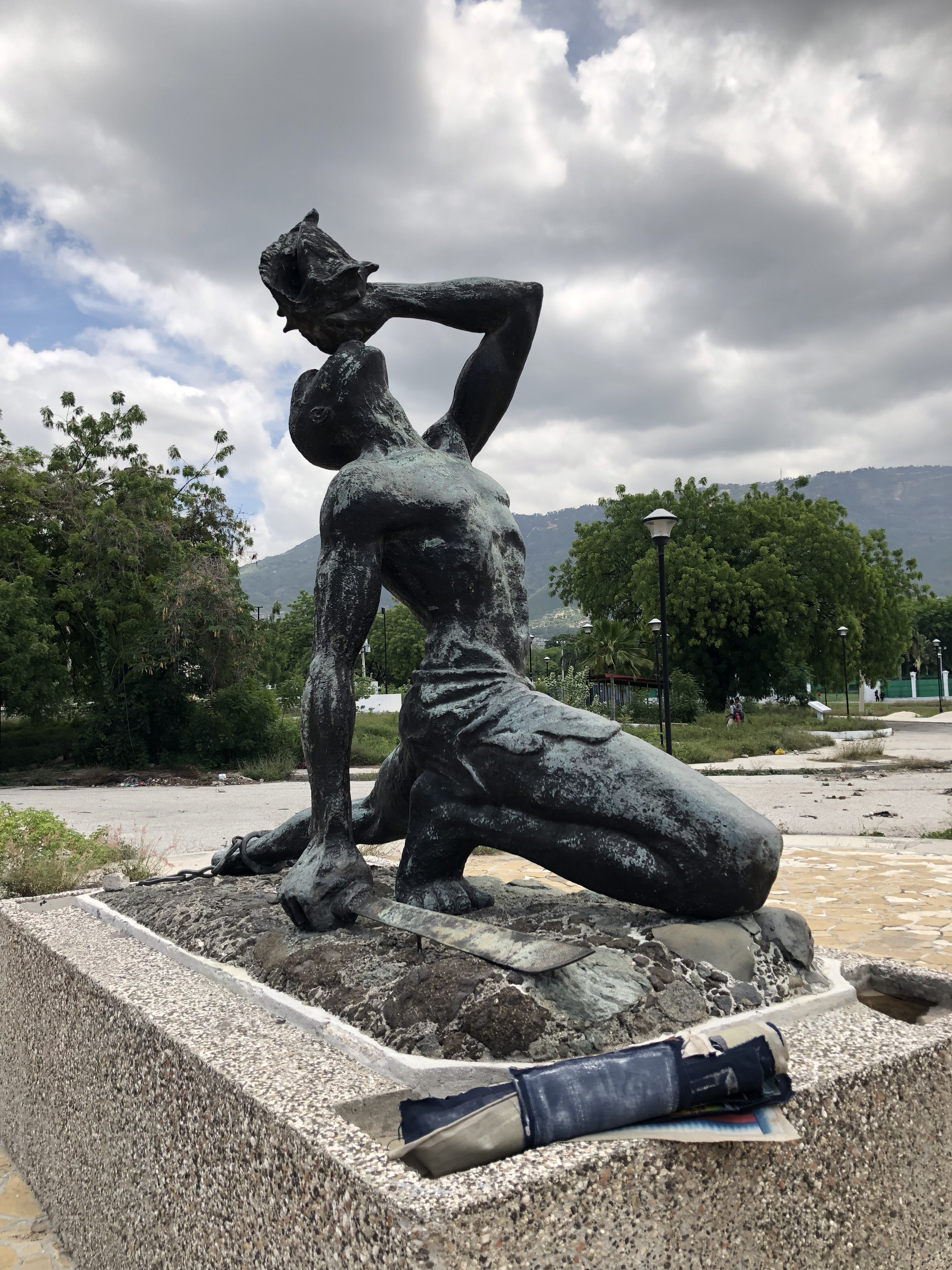

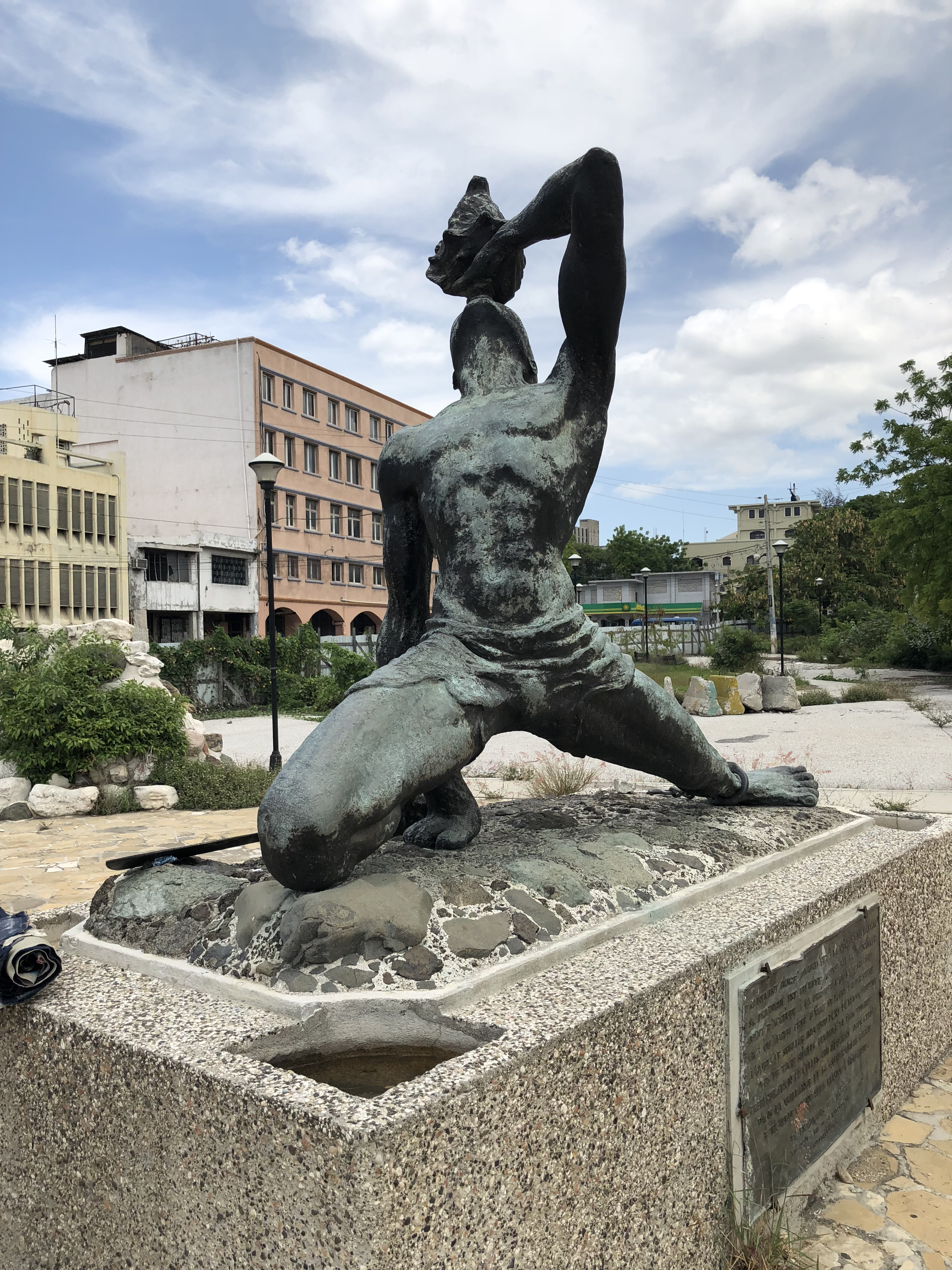

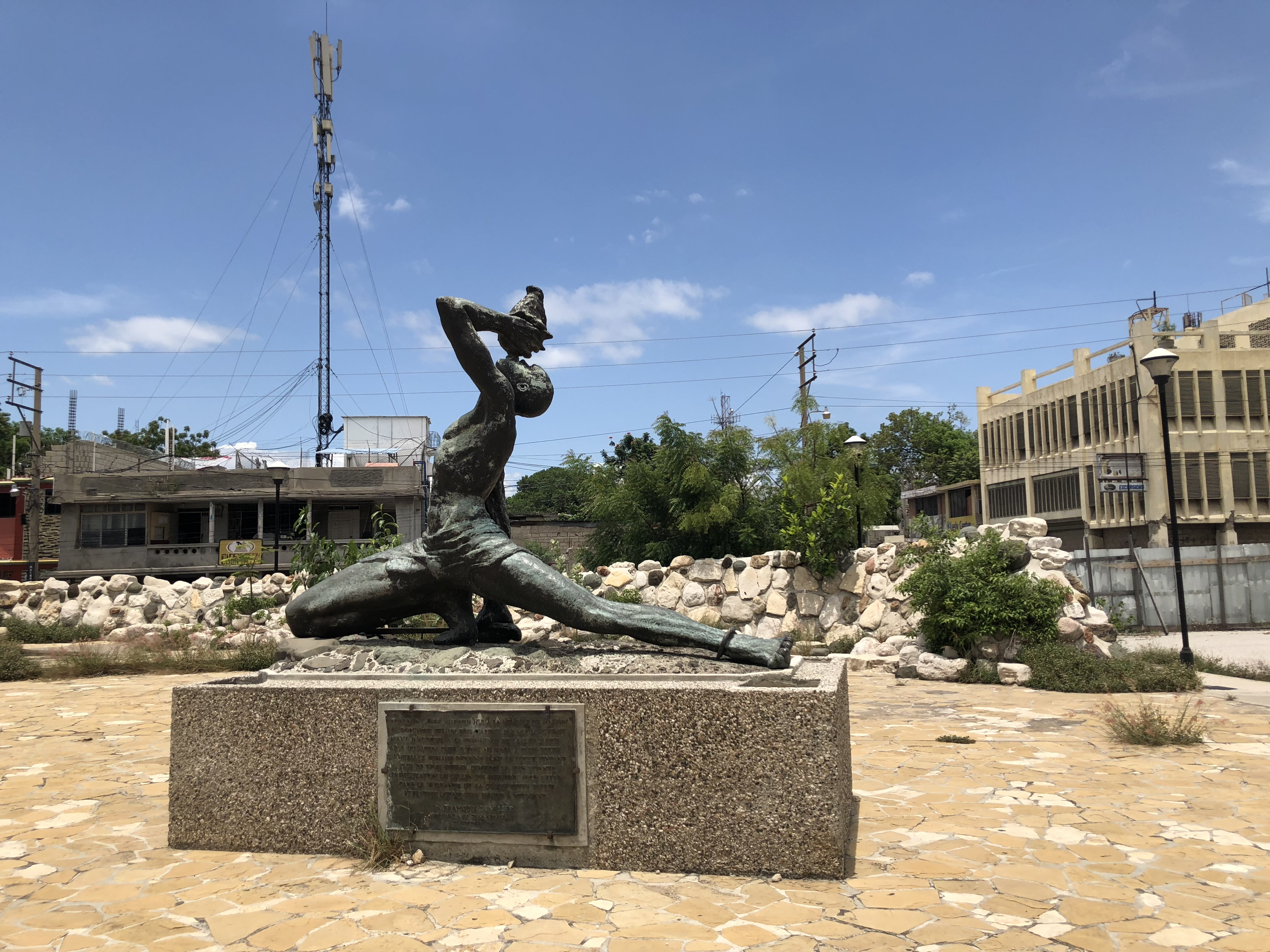
