= Benoit (crater) =

Crater on Mercury

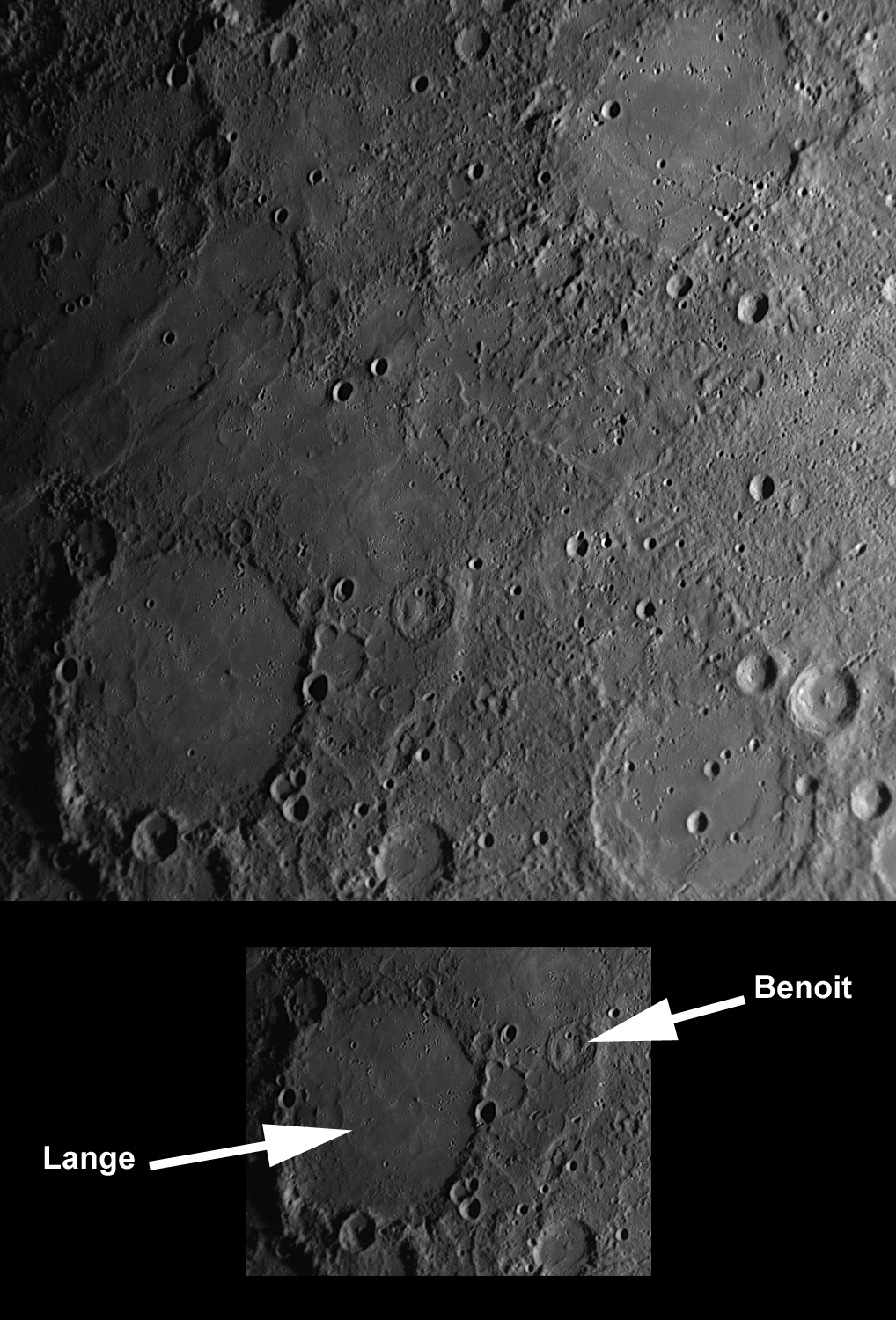
- Benoit crater, next to Lange crater
- Feature type: Impact crater
- Location: Eminescu quadrangle, Mercury
- Coordinates: 7.48°N 255.65°W
- Diameter: 40 km
- Eponym: Rigaud Benoit

Benoit is a crater on Mercury. Its floor is quite unusual, with two mounds that have been suggested to be evidence of intrusive volcanic activity on Mercury.

Its name was adopted by the International Astronomical Union (IAU) in 2009. It is named for the Haitian painter Rigaud Benoit.

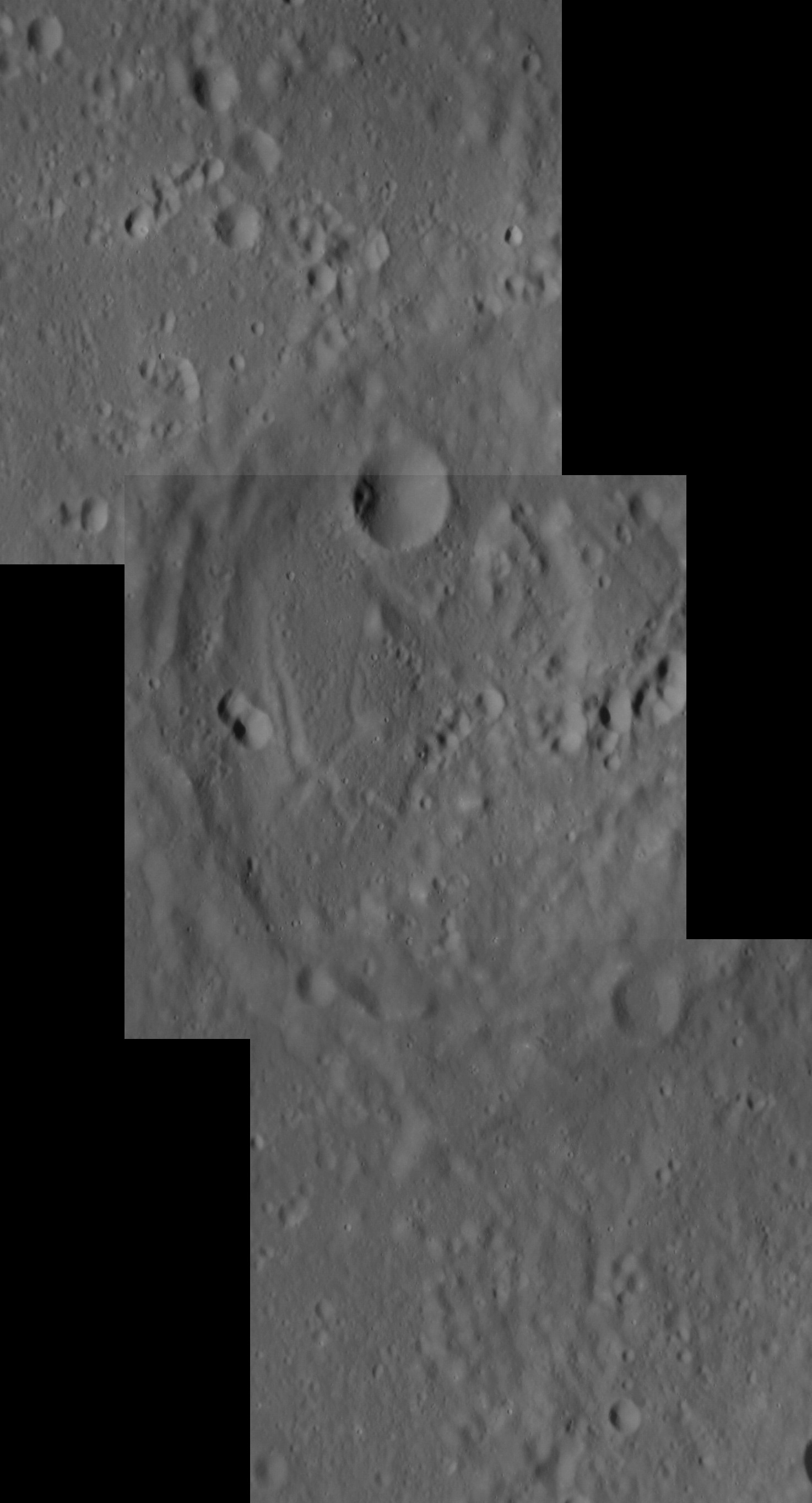
MESSENGER mosaic centered on Benoit crater
