= Laurent Casimir =

Haitian artist (1928–1990)

- Born: May 8, 1928; Anse-à-Veau, Haiti
- Died: 1990
- Known for: Painting

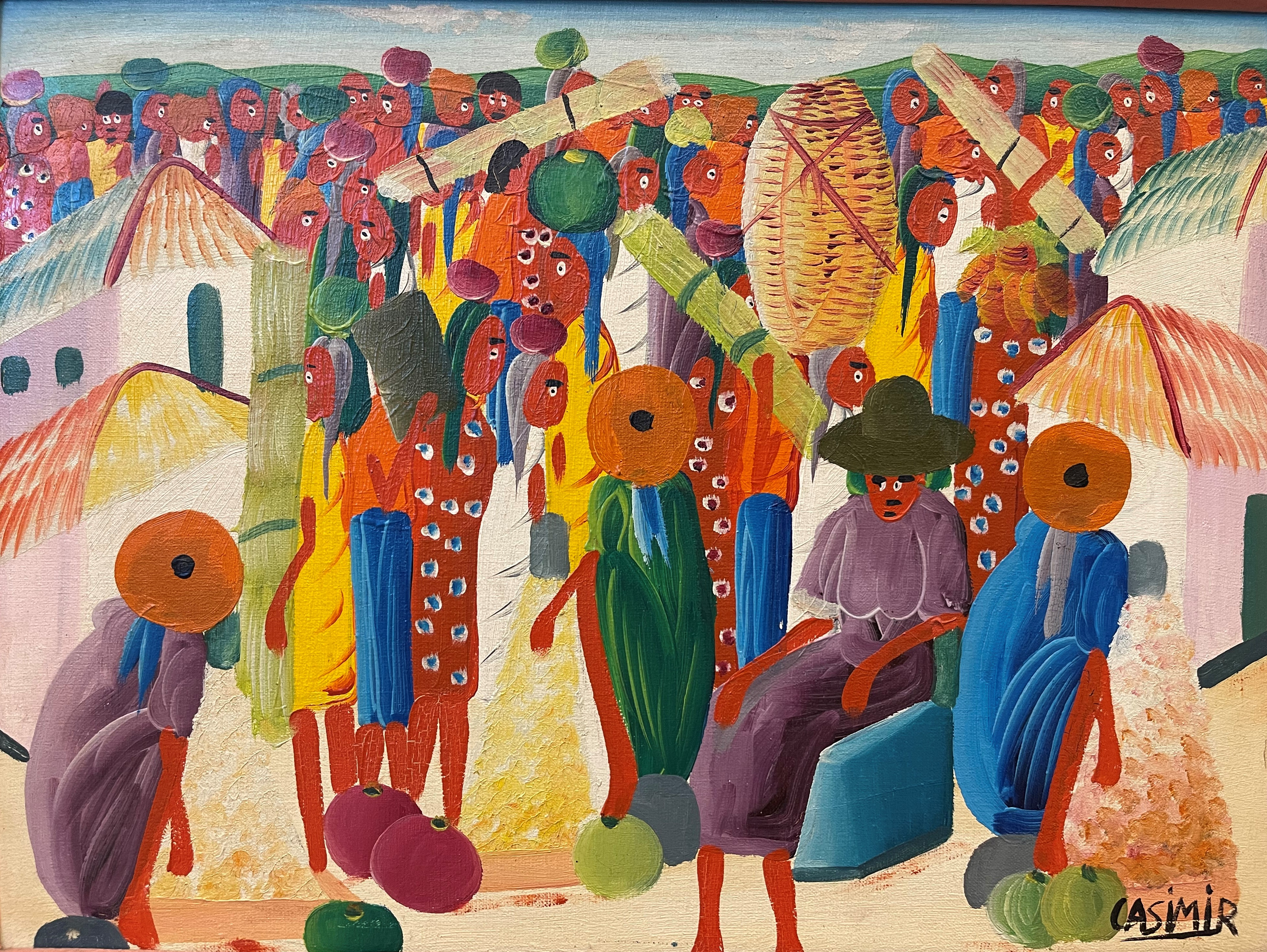
Market painting by Casimir

Laurent Casimir (May 8, 1928 – 1990) was a Haitian artist. His work is held in major collections, including the Figge Art Museum and the Milwaukee Art Museum.

== Biography ==
Casimir was born in Anse-à-Veau. He moved to Port-au-Prince in the late 1940s and was introduced to the Centre d'Art in 1947 by his friend, the painter Dieudonné Cedor. From 1950 to 1956, he attended the Foyer of Fine Arts, founded by a group of intellectuals and modern artists, including Cedor.

Casimir was one of the originators of a Haitian archetype, the market painting. He painted using various shades of red, orange, and yellow. His style has been often imitated, making it difficult to confirm the authenticity of the paintings that bear his name.

In the mid-1970s, he lived in Martissant, where he would sell his paintings from the front room, while in the back yard, a few of his apprentices would be painting and filling in the colours and the Casimir's canvases. All would later be signed by him.

== Bibliography ==
- The Naive Tradition: Haiti, Milwaukee Art Center, 1974.
- Ute Stebick, Haitian Art, The Brooklyn Museum, 1978.
