= Clara Seley =

Russian Empire-born American artist (1905–2003)

- Born: Clara Kalnitsky; July 15, 1905; Kiev, Russian Empire (now Kyiv, Ukraine)
- Died: July 2, 2003 (aged 97)
- Other name: Clara Kalnitsky Seley
- Occupations: Visual artist, model
- Known for: Sculpture, drawing, watercolor, pastel
- Spouse: Jason Seley (m. 1942–1983; his death)

Clara Kalnitsky Seley (July 15, 1905 – July 2, 2003) was a Russian Empire-born American artist and sculptor. She was born as Clara Kalnitsky.

== Early life and family ==
Clara Kalnitsky was born on July 15, 1905, in Kiev, Russian Empire (now Kyiv, Ukraine). She came to the United States in 1911, and was raised and educated in Newark, New Jersey.

Following a career in modeling and later in the rare book departments of Bamberger's department store in Newark and Brentano's Bookstore in New York, she met and married Jason Seley (May 20, 1919 – June 23, 1983), an American sculptor, in 1942. She then changed her last name to Seley.

== Career ==
The couple moved to Port-au-Prince, Haiti, in January 1946, where Jason would teach under a U. S. Government grant and have three solo exhibitions at the Centre d'Art (in 1946, 1948, and 1949), along with several commissions. Clara Seley, a self-taught artist, taught dance while in Haiti and began sculpting during this period. Working primarily in wood, mainly Haitian mahogany, as well as bronze and aluminum, her sculptures mostly took the forms of abstract torsos and heads.

Following their years in Haiti, the couple lived in Paris and Germany. Seley was first represented in the United States by Kraushaar Galleries in New York, although her paintings and drawings were shown by the Schainen Stern Gallery in 1960.

Jason taught at Hofstra University from 1953 to 1965. Clara would later work in various media, including pastel and watercolor, in the 1940s and 1950s. She received artist's fellowships to Yaddo in Saratoga Springs, New York in 1987 and 1990. Jason, who received his BA degree in sculpture at Cornell University in 1940, began teaching sculpture there in 1966, becoming chair of the department of art (1968–1973) and dean of the College of Architecture, Art and Planning (1980–1983).

Seley would give several of her artworks to Cornell's Herbert F. Johnson Museum of Art. Among their other gifts to the Johnson Museum were portraits of the couple by Waldo Peirce and Lotte Jacobi. The long-planned Jason and Clara Seley Sculpture Court, featuring three sculptures by Jason, was completed at Cornell in December 2017.

== Solo exhibitions ==
- 1960, Schainen Stern Gallery
- 1964, Roko Gallery, New York City, New York
- 1973, Hobart and William Smith Colleges, Geneva, New York
- 1974, Gallery One-Twenty-One, Ithaca, New York
- 1988, Herbert F. Johnson Museum of Art, Ithaca, New York

== Two-person exhibitions with Jason Seley ==
- 1961, Country Art Gallery, Locust Valley, Long Island, New York
- 1965, Country Art Gallery, Locust Valley, Long Island, New York
- 1976, Upstairs Gallery, Ithaca, New York
- 1977, Everson Museum of Art, Syracuse, New York
