= Luckner Lazard =

Luckner Lazard or Lucner Lazard (July 7, 1928 – May 15, 1998) was a Haitian-born painter and sculptor. Born in Port-au-Prince, Lazard studied for five years at the Centre d'Art before receiving a scholarship in 1951 to study in Paris, France. In 1956, he founded the Brochette Gallery in Haiti and settled in the United States. Lazard's works have been exhibited in Europe, the Caribbean, North America, and Brazil. Some notable exhibitions featuring Lazard's works include showcases at the French Institute in Mexico, the Zegri Gallery in New York City, and, the Paul Robeson Multimedia Center in Washington, D.C. (1976).
