= Lange (crater) =

Crater on Mercury

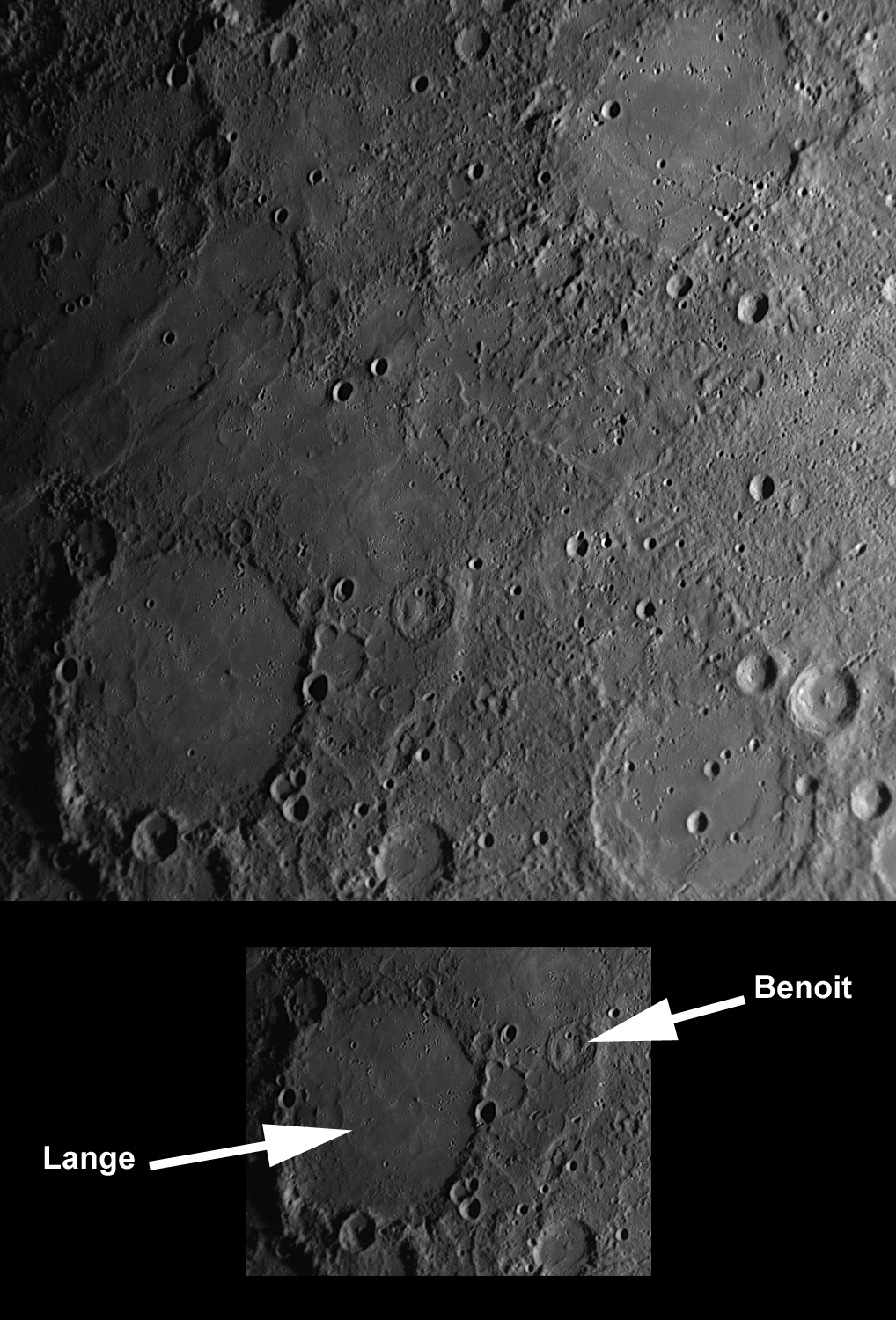
- Lange crater, next to Benoit crater
- Feature type: Peak-ring impact basin
- Location: Eminescu quadrangle, Mercury
- Coordinates: 6.40°N 259.59°W
- Diameter: 167 km (104 mi)
- Eponym: Dorothea Lange

Lange is a crater on Mercury. It was named by the IAU in 2009 after American photographer Dorothea Lange.

Lange appears to have been flooded by lava, with only faint traces remaining of a buried inner ring. It is one of 110 peak ring basins on Mercury.

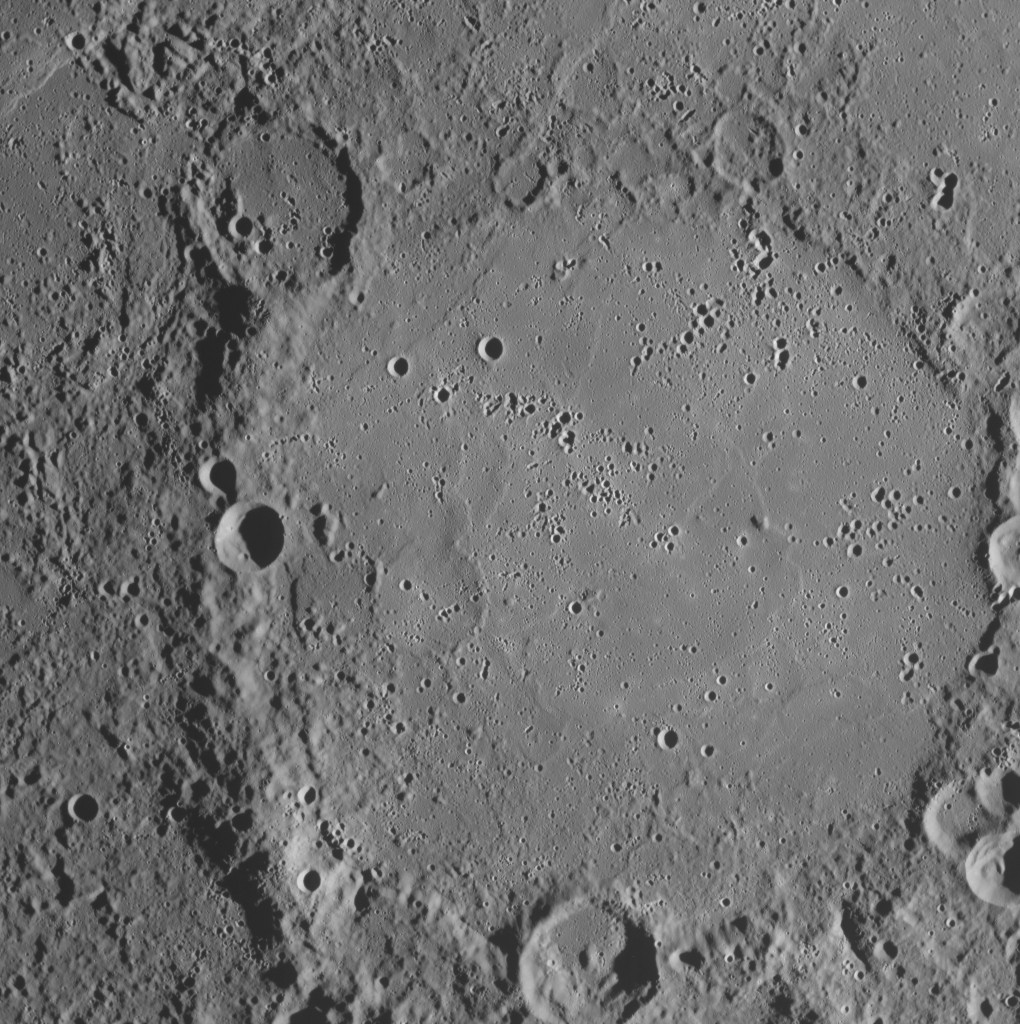
Lange crater
