= Barikad Crew =

Haitian rapper group

- Also known as: BC
- Origin: Bas Peu d'Chose, Haiti
- Genres: Rap kreyòl Hip hop
- Years active: 2002–present
- Label: Sak Pase Records
- Members: Bricks; Brital; Izolan; Kondagana; Fantom
- Past members: Dade; Deja-Voo; Fred Hype; Marco; Master Sun; Papa K-tafalk; Young Cliff
- Website: http://www.barikadcrewred.com/ (archived)

Barikad Crew is a rap kreyòl (Haitian hip-hop) group from Port-au-Prince, Haiti.

== History ==
The group is from Rue Nicolas in Port-au-Prince, and was founded in 2002 by Papa K-tafalk, Deja-Voo and Kondagana. Their primary focus was to produce music that reflects the lifestyle of the slums. The trio invited several other rappers from other underground groups to join.

Their first single was a carnival song "Projè Project" released in 2003. In the beginning of 2004, Barikad Crew released "Bay Hip hop Bourad" together with a video filmed in their neighborhood park. Their second single, "Kijan'l Te Ye", was released in January 2005.

The group rose to fame at the end of 2005 when they won 3rd place at the popular TV's Christmas songs contest, "Konkou Chante Nwel", on Telemax with the song "Nwel Pa'm".

At the beginning of 2006, Barikad Crew released their carnival hit song, called "Trip N'ap Trip".

Their debut album is called Goumen Pou Saw Kwè, and was released in November 2007. At the time of the album release, the group's members were: Bricks, Brital, Dade, Deja-voo, Fantom, Izolan, Kondagana, Marco, Master Sun, Papa K-tafalk, and Young Cliff.

On 15 June 2008, three members of the group (K-tafalk, Deja-Voo, Dade) died in a car accident while they were on their way to a concert in Haiti. Less than two years later, another member, Young Cliff, died in the January 2010 earthquake.

On 17 February 2015, lead singer Fantom came into contact with a high-voltage power line during a Kanaval parade. At least 18 people were killed and 78 injured when they were caught in the ensuing stampede.

On 28 May 2022, the Haitian press published the news of the death of Fred Hype, beatmaker and producer of Barikad Crew.

== Members ==
- Bricks
- Brital
- Dade (died in a car accident on 15 June 2008)
- Deja-Voo (died in a car accident on 15 June 2008)
- Fantom
- Izolan
- Kondagana
- Marco (left group in 2013)
- Master Sun (left group in 2012) but He's the CEO of masterliveryservices.com in Boston MA
- Papa K-tafalk (died in a car accident on 15 June 2008)
- Young Cliff (died in the Haiti earthquake on 12 January 2010)

== Albums ==
- Goumen Pou Saw Kwè (November 2007)
- Jiskobou (2008)
- RED (July 7, 2012)

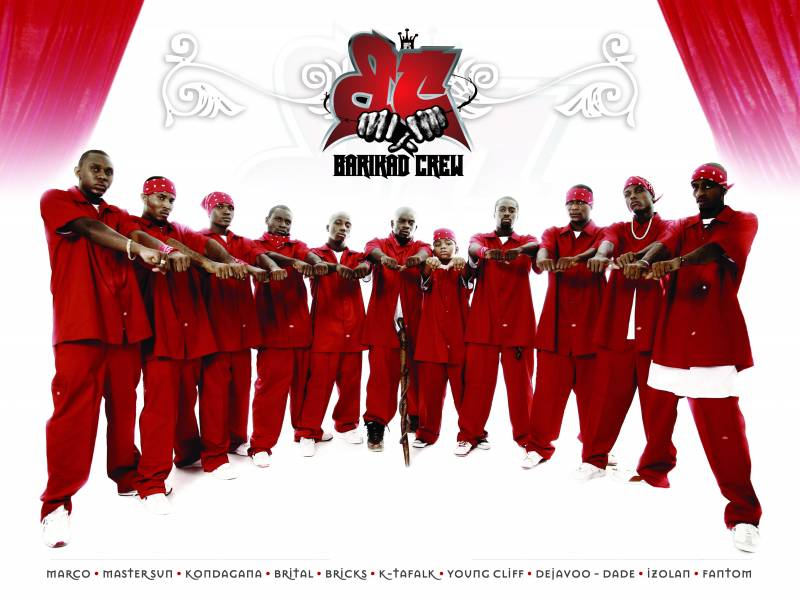
