= Micius Stephane =

Haitian artist (1912–2012)

- Born: 1912; Bainet, Sud-Est, Haiti
- Died: 1996 (aged 83–84); Port-au-Prince, Haiti
- Occupations: Visual artist, shoe maker
- Known for: Painting, sculptor

Micius Stephane (1912 – 1996) was a Haitian visual artist. He was known for painting genre scenes of everyday life in a folk art style.

== Life and career ==
Stephane was born in 1912, in Bainet in Sud-Est, Haiti. Stephane was of the first generation Haitian painters, and he also worked as a shoe maker, and sculptor. He worked at the Centre D'Art art center in Port-au-Prince starting in 1946. His earlier work was more overtly political. In his later career, his work focus on everyday genre scenes.

Stephane died in 1996, in Port-au-Prince, Haiti.

His work is in the museum collection at Bryan University in Tempe, Arizona.

== Exhibitions ==
- 1951, Paintings from Haiti: Institute of Contemporary Arts, Institute of Contemporary Arts, London, England
- 1963, 19 Schilders uit Haiti (19 Painters from Haiti), Stedelijk Museum Amsterdam, Amsterdam, Netherlands
- 1991, Haitian Art: Selections From a Chicago Collection, Hyde Park Art Center, Chicago, Illinois, U.S.
- 2004, Winslow Anderson Collection of Haitian Art, Huntington Museum of Art, Huntington, West Virginia, U.S.
