= Fred Hype =

Haitian beatmaker and record producer (died 2022)

- Born: Fred Orival; Gonaïves, Haiti
- Died: May 28, 2022; Dominican Republic
- Other name: Yo Hype !
- Occupations: Beatmaker; composer; graphic designer; producer
- Musical career
- Instruments: Synthesizer; drum machine; sampler; keyboard
- Years active: 2000-2021
- Labels: FHP; Hip Faktory
- Formerly of: Barikad Crew

Fred Orival (died May 28, 2022), better known as Fred Hype, was a Haitian hip-hop beatmaker, composer, and producer based in Port-au-Prince.

== Life and career ==
Fred Orival was born in Gonaïves, Haiti.

== Death ==
On May 28, 2022, Orival died in the Dominican Republic.
