= Fantom (rapper) =

- Born: Daniel Darinus; March 26, 1981 (age 45); Léogâne, Haiti
- Genres: Hip-hop
- Occupations: Rapper, songwriter, composer
- Instrument: Vocals
- Years active: 1994-present
- Labels: Hip Faktory; Tapajè Records; Barvensky Media Group

Daniel Darinus (born March 26, 1981), known professionally as Fantom, is a Haitian rapper. Born in Léogâne, Darinus began a musical career in 1994. In 2009, he recorded his first album Men Nonm Nan for Hip Faktory. He gained fame as a founding member of the Barikad Crew, a Port-au-Prince-based hip-hop group formed in 2002.

== Early life ==
Daniel Darinus was born on March 26, 1981, in Léogâne, and grew up in Port-au-Prince. Both of his parents are of Haitian-Caribbean origin: Solange Orientale, his mother, is a Haitian retailer, and his father Astrel Darinus, a retailer. Darinus attended Rosalvo Bobo, Frères Adrien, Les normaliens réunis, IEU and Roussan Camille schools for his classical studies.

== Music career ==
At 13, he made his solo debut, introducing himself to dancehall. He then gained recognition with D-camp and S.O.S. before joining the groups Barikad Crew and Pick-up Click. In 2009, after two albums with Barikad Crew and one with Pick-up Click, he released his own project: Men Nonm Lan, an album that revealed his full potential as a rapper.

== Discography ==
- Men non'm nan (2009)
- Yo gen vè (2010)
- Salute vol.1 (2013)
- Salute vol. 2 (2014)
- Point final (2015)
- Reyenkanasyon (2016)
- Salute vol. 3 (2017)
- Rap onorab (2020)
- nan bòl yo (2022)
- ’’Tololo’’. (2024
