= Centre d'Art =

Art center and school in Port-au-Prince, Haiti

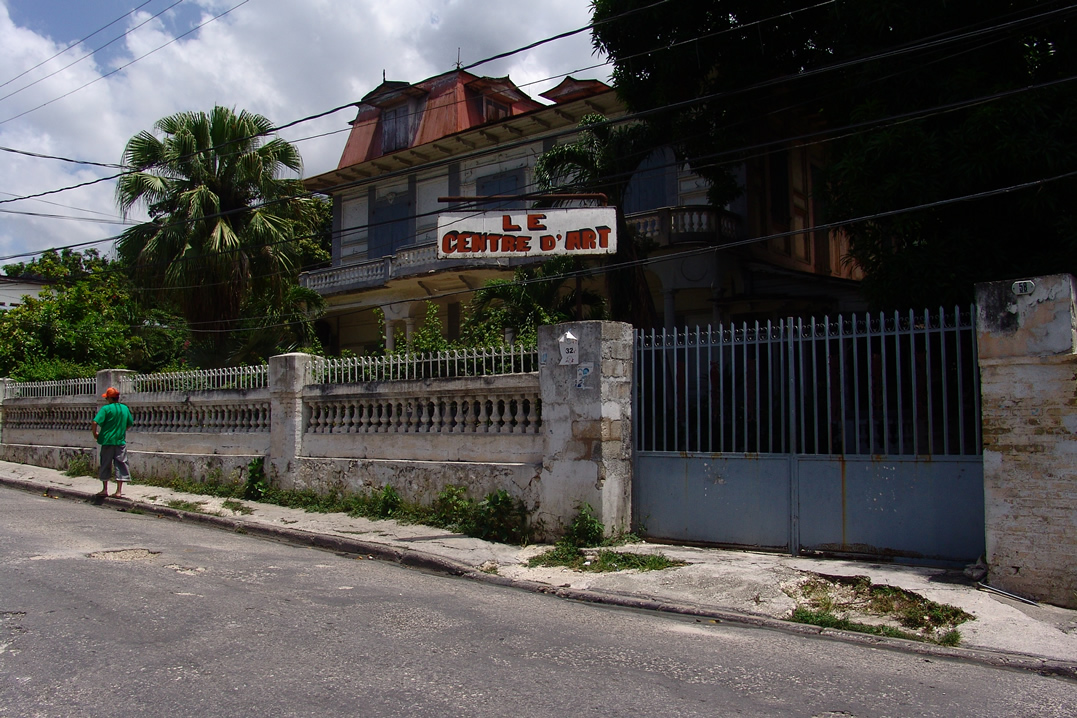
Le Centre d'Art, before 2010 earthquake

Le Centre d'Art, also known as Le Centre d'Art d'Haïti, is an art center, art school and art gallery located in Port-au-Prince, Haiti. It was founded in 1944 by American watercolorist DeWitt Peters and several prominent Haitians from the intellectual and cultural circles such as Maurice Borno, Albert Mangonès, Geo Remponeau, Jean Chenet and Gerald Bloncourt. In 2010, the center's building was destroyed by the Haitian earthquake, and by 2014 they were able to reopen in temporary premises, in which they continue to operate to this day.

== History ==
The institution was at the center of what became known as the Haitian Art Movement, often also known as naive art, educating and exhibiting founding artists including Albert Mangones, Gerald Bloncourt, Maurice Borno, Rigaud Benoit, Hector Hyppolite, Daniel Lafontant, Marie-Josée Nadal, Rose-Marie Desruisseau, Philome Obin, Micius Stephane, and Castera Bazile. Jason Seley was an early teacher.

French Surrealist writer and poet André Breton is known to have visited, having written in the guestbook, after meeting Hector Hyppolite, "Haitian painting will drink the blood of the phoenix. And, with the epaulets of Dessalines, it will ventilate the world".

Le Centre d'Art was destroyed in the 2010 earthquake and many artworks from its collection were damaged. The Smithsonian Institution as well as several other local and international organisations has since collaborated with recovery and conservation efforts. Since their reopening in 2014, the museum has been housed in temporary premises as issues of funding have meant they were unable to restore their original premises. In December 2019, Le Centre d'Art purchased a large gingerbread mansion in the area of Pacot, Port-au-Prince. The purchase was made possible with donors such as Fondation de France. The center planned to open at the new location in 2021, but this has been delayed.
