= Bainet =

Bainet Benè
- Commune
- Interactive map of Bainet
- Location in Haiti
- Coordinates: 18°11′0″N 72°45′0″W
- Country: Haiti
- Department: Sud-Est
- Arrondissement: Bainet

Area
  - Total: 300.6 km^{2} (116.1 sq mi)
- Elevation: 0 m (0 ft)

Population (2015)
  - Total: 86,755
  - Density: 288.6/km^{2} (747.5/sq mi)
- Time zone: UTC−05:00 (EST)
  - Summer (DST): UTC−04:00 (EDT)
- Postal code: HT 9210

Bainet (French pronunciation: [benɛ]; Haitian Creole: Benè) is a commune in the Bainet Arrondissement, in the Sud-Est department of Haiti. It has 86,755 inhabitants as of 2015.

== History ==
In late 1791 and early 1792, during the early Haitian Revolution, slaves in Bainet rebelled as part of the Trou Coffy uprising led by Romaine-la-Prophétesse.

The commune's administrative offices were destroyed as a result of the 2010 Haiti earthquake. As a result, from 2010 to 2016, city officials worked in prefabricated premises funded by the United Nations Stabilisation Mission in Haiti (MINUSTAH). MINUSTAH ultimately funded the creation of a new town hall, which was inaugurated in October 2016.

== Notable person ==
The Haitian artist and photographer Gérald Bloncourt was born in Bainet.
