= Rigaud Benoit =

Haitian artist

- Born: January 11, 1911; Port-au-Prince, Haiti
- Died: October 30, 1986 (aged 75); Port-au-Prince, Haiti
- Known for: Painting, murals, ceramics
- Notable work: The Nativity (mural, Cathédrale de Sainte Trinité)
- Style: Naïve art, Surrealism
- Movement: Haitian art
- Spouse: Hermithe Hyppolite
- Awards: 2008 USA Fellows, 2009 Rome Prize
- Memorials: Benoit crater on Mercury

Rigaud Benoit (1911–1986) was a prominent Haitian painter and member of the Haitian art movement. He was one of Haiti's foremost painters of Naive art. His artwork is among the most valued and sought after in the Haitian art market.

== Early life ==
A native of Port-au-Prince, Benoit had been a shoemaker, musician, taxi driver and chauffeur before making his living as a painter. He also supplemented his income by painting pottery pieces that he rarely signed or acknowledged.

== Career ==
He joined the Centre d'Art in 1944. He was inspired by the works of Dewitt Peters, Georges Remponeau, and Luckner Lazare.

Reportedly, after seeing works displayed at the Centre d'Art, he decided he could do as well as any of the featured artists. Later in life, Benoit denied this, insisting that he had visited the Centre out of curiosity before submitting his first works to Peters.

Benoit was an early member of the Haitian art movement known as Naive Art, so-called because of its members' limited formal training. The movement was first recognized and promoted by the Centre d'Art, founded in 1944 by the American Quaker and World War II conscientious objector Dewitt Peters.

Benoit's paintings became highly sought after. By the early 1950s, Benoit was one of a handful of artists asked to decorate the interior of the Cathedral of Sainte Trinité. He was commissioned to paint the mural, Nativity above the high altar. The Catholic archbishop initially denied permission for "mere Haitians" to decorate the Roman cathedral. However, the Episcopal bishop eagerly consented to the project. On seeing the result he reportedly exclaimed "Thank God! They painted Haitians." The cathedral and most of its many masterpieces were destroyed in the January 2010 earthquake.

Benoit worked slowly, usually completing fewer than half-a-dozen pieces a year. Following a near-fatal automobile accident early in 1980, his production declined further. However, he continued to produce scenes of Haitian life and narrative scenes until his death.

== Style ==
Benoit's work is characterized by precise draftsmanship. In comparison to most Haitian artists outside the Northern or Cap-Haïtien school, he used muted colors. His narrative paintings often have a sense of humor. Some of Benoit's later work was surrealistic. His surrealist paintings mostly depict voodoo scenes or deities, such as Lwa.

== Honors ==
In 2009, the International Astronomical Union (IAU) named the Benoit crater on the planet Mercury in his honour.

== Personal life ==
Benoit owned a cottage on the outskirts of the Haitian capital. Benoit had four children, two of whom were adopted, with Hermithe Hyppolite. Hermithe was the daughter of Benoit's friend and artistic contemporary, Hector Hyppolite. Three of his children, Yves Lafontant, Jacques Dorce, and Fils Rigaud Benoit, also became artists.
