= Spatial composition =

In landscape ecology, spatial composition describes the content of a landscape in terms of the number of different categories of elements existing in the landscape and their proportions. Most commonly the elements being measured are spatial patches of different types. Together with spatial configuration, spatial composition is a basic component of landscape heterogeneity indices.

== See also ==
- Patch dynamics
- Landscape Ecology
