= Champ de Mars (Haiti) =

Public park in Port-au-Prince, Haiti

Coordinates: 18.54345°N 72.33533°W

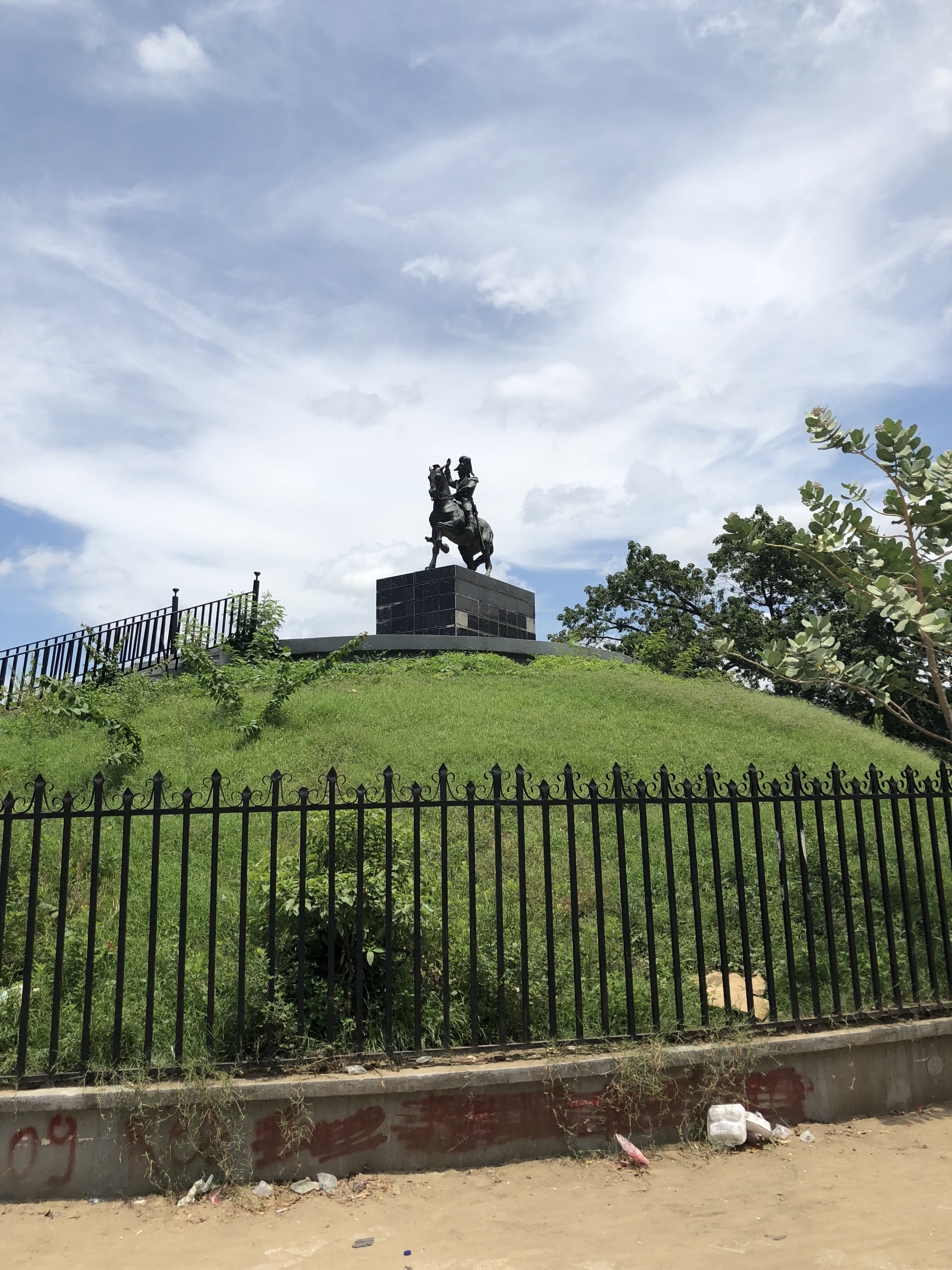
Statue of Jean-Jacques Dessalines in one of the squares

Champ de Mars (Haitian Creole: Channmas) is the biggest public park in the downtown area of Port-au-Prince, Haiti. It consists of a series of public squares divided by large boulevards.

== History ==
For much of Port-au-Prince’s history Champ de Mars was used for military parades, until 1912 where it was remodelled into a racetrack with wrought-iron viewing stands facing the National Palace. Its current design is from 1999, when it was rebuilt to celebrate the city’s 250th anniversary.

Champ de Mars was heavily affected by the 2010 earthquake and the National Palace destroyed. The area was fenced off for a period after.

== Description ==
Champs de Mars contains a number of statues of Haiti's founding fathers, including Toussaint Louverture, Jean-Jacques Dessalines, Alexander Pétion and Henri Christophe.

The Musée du Panthéon National Haïtien featuring Haitian history, art and culture is located at Champ de Mars.

A government project providing free public WIFI in the area was inaugurated In October 2018.
