= Jason Seley =

American sculptor, educator (1919–1983)

- Born: May 20, 1919; Newark, New Jersey, U.S.
- Died: June 23, 1983 (aged 64); Ithaca, New York, U.S.
- Education: Art Students League of New York, Cornell University (BA)
- Occupations: Visual artist, teacher
- Notable work: Colleoni II (1969)
- Spouse: Clara Kalnitsky (m. 1942–1983; his death)
- Awards: Fulbright Scholarship (1949)

Jason L. Seley (May 20, 1919 – June 23, 1983) was an American sculptor, educator, and academic administrator. He was an early teacher at the Centre d'Art in Haiti in the 1940s, and served as the dean of the Cornell University College of Architecture, Art, and Planning in the 1980s. Seley was known for his eccentric figurative sculptures.

== Early life and education ==
Jason Seley was born in Newark, New Jersey, to parents Leah (née Kridel) and Simon M. Seley. In 1942, Seley married Clara Kalnitsky, a former model from Kiev, turned sculptor. He graduated in 1936 from Weequahic High School.

He received his BA degree in sculpture at Cornell University in 1940; and in 1943 for two years he studied at the Art Students League of New York, under Ossip Zadkine.

== Career ==
While in school, Albert Mangonès was his roommate at Cornell, and convinced Seley to teach in Haiti. Seley and his wife moved to Port-au-Prince, Haiti, in January 1946, where Seley would teach under a United States government grant and have three solo exhibitions at the Centre d'Art (in 1946, 1948, and 1949), along with several commissions. In 1949, Seley was awarded a Fulbright Scholarship to study art in Paris.

Seley worked as a professor at Hofstra University from 1953 to 1965.; followed by working as a professor at Cornell University starting in 1966, becoming chair of the department of art (1968 to 1973) and dean of the College of Architecture, Art and Planning (1980 to 1983).

His preferred material for his abstract sculptures was chrome-plated steel, usually from automobile bumpers. In 1969, Seley returned to representational work with Colleoni II, a replica of Andrea del Verrocchio's famous equestrian statue, in which he created using nothing but car-bumpers. Colleoni II (1969–1971) is part of the Empire State Plaza Art Collection and is located in the Corning Tower Plaza Level in the Empire State Plaza.

He died at age 64 of an illness on June 23, 1983, at Tompkins Community Hospital (now Cayuga Medical Center) in Ithaca.
