= Gérald Bloncourt =

Haitian painter and photographer (1926–2018)

Gérald Bloncourt (4 November 1926 – 29 October 2018), also known as Gérard Bloncourt, was a Haitian painter and photographer resident in the suburbs of Paris, France. Born in the small city of Bainet, in Haiti's Sud-Est department, Bloncourt was a founding member of the Centre d'Art. He was involved with La Ruche, a Haitian youth journal of revolutionary art and politics, and was one of the instigators of the revolt which toppled Haitian president Élie Lescot in 1946. He subsequently went into exile in France, where he became "the most important photographer of the French workers’ movement" according to Michael Löwy. Besides painting watercolors and frescoes, he also did etchings and drawings. He died on 29 October 2018 at the age of 91.
