= Dieudonné Cédor =

Haitian painter (1925–2010)

- Born: March 8, 1925; Anse-à-Veau, Haiti
- Died: September 27, 2010 (aged 85); Carrefour, Haiti
- Known for: Painting

Dieudonné Cédor (March 8, 1925 – September 27, 2010) was a Haitian painter. Born in Anse-à-Veau, Cédor had his work displayed around the world, with exhibits in Guatemala (1951), Mexico (1952), Germany, Belgium, the Netherlands (1968), Miami (1969), Venezuela, Colombia, and Panama. In 1967, he painted a mural for the Port-au-Prince International Airport. In 1953, he was awarded Haiti's Labor Department exhibition prize and, in 1957, the Grand Work Prize of the Haitian Office of Tourism.
