= Albert Mangonès =

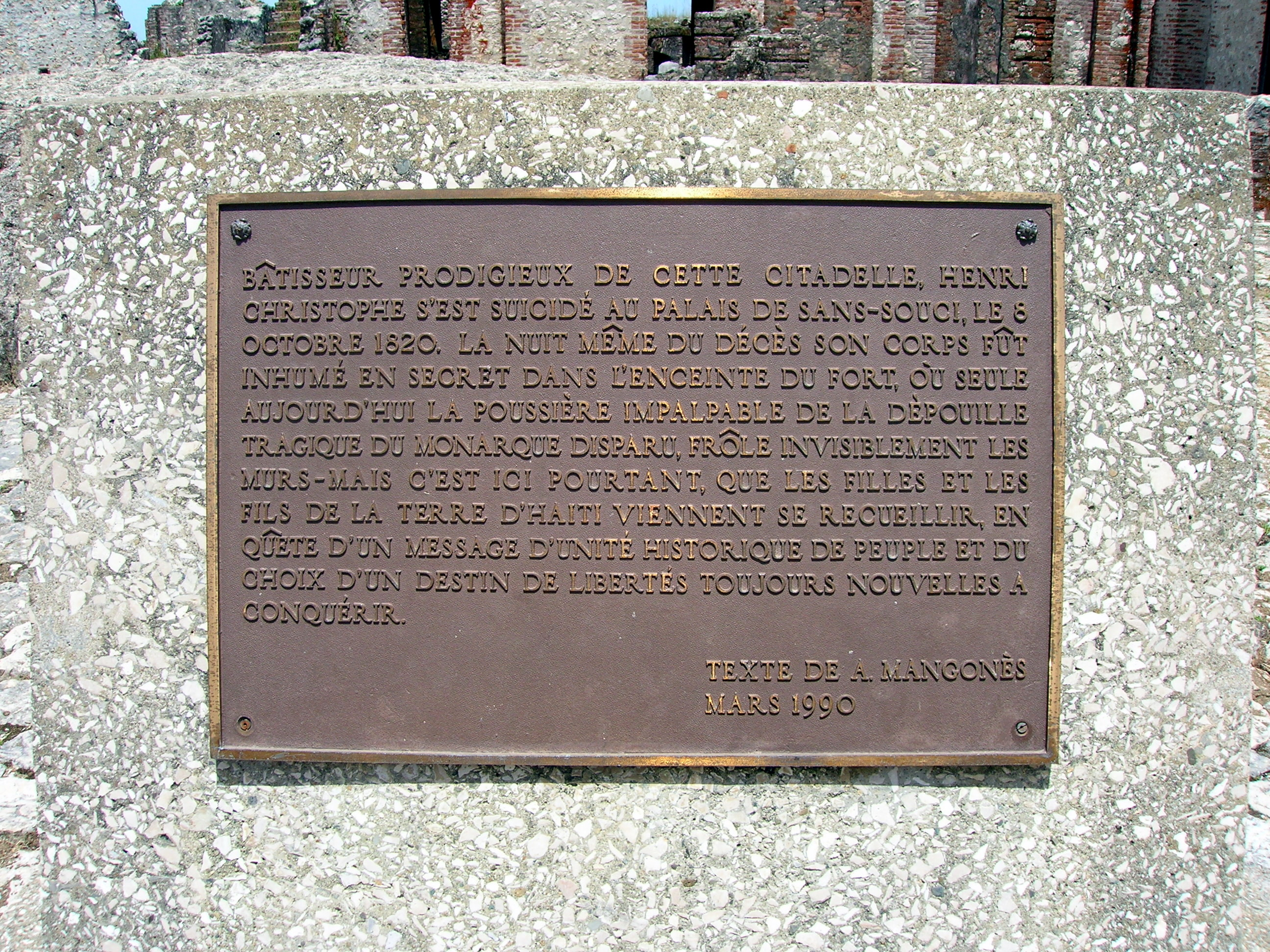
- Citadelle Laferrière, near Milot in Haiti : Albert Mangonès text on the plaque commemorating the death of Henri Christophe.
- Born: Joseph Albert Mangonès; 26 March 1917; Port-au-Prince, Haiti
- Died: 25 April 2002 (aged 85); Port-au-Prince, Haiti
- Education: Royal Academy of Fine Arts, Brussels, Cornell University
- Occupation: Architect
- Known for: Le Marron Inconnu (also called "Le Nègre Marron / Nèg Mawon")

Albert Mangonès (26 March 1917 – 25 April 2002), was a Haitian architect.

== Biography ==
Albert Mangonès was born the son of Fernande Elisabeth Auguste and Philippe Auguste Edmond Mangonès on March 26, 1917, in Port-au-Prince. Like most children of Haitian elite, Albert Mangonès was sent away to study abroad.

Mangonès was trained at the Académie Royale des Beaux-Arts of Brussels, one of Europe's most prestigious institutions, and at Cornell University in New York where he studied architecture between 1939 and 1942, where he received a gold medal for excellence. He was a friend of artist Jason Seley in college, and they were roommates at Cornell.

In 1944, Albert Mangonès was one of the founders of the Centre d'Art in Port-au-Prince, which plays an important role in the discovery of popular painters of Haiti.

In 1968 Mangonès created the iconic monument of Le Marron Inconnu ("The Unknown Slave"), which pay tribute to the maroons of the Haitian Revolution.

As the founder in 1979 of Institut de Sauvegarde du Patrimoine National (ISPAN), the Institute for the Protection of the National Heritage, Mangonès helped pioneer the preservation of Haiti's architectural heritage. He participated in the restoration of the Citadelle Laferrière, and the historic National Park including the Sans-Souci Palace and the Ramiers site in the Nord department of Haiti, a UNESCO World Heritage Site.

== Personal life ==
Mangonès married Emmelyne Bonnefil in 1944, they were later divorced; and he married Vonik Tourdot in 1959, and they remained married until his death in 2002; she died in Pétion-Ville in 2006.
