= Marie-José Nadal-Gardère =

Haitian painter and sculptor (1931–2020)

Marie-José Nadal-Gardère (22 April 1931 – 23 December 2020) was a Haitian painter and sculptor. Born in Port-au-Prince, Nadal-Gardère studied in France and later Canada, where she learned ceramics and metal sculpting. Her works have been exhibited throughout Canada, the United States, the Caribbean, and western Europe. She was the owner of the Marassa Gallery in Pétion-Ville, a suburb of Port-au-Prince. Nadal-Gardère died on 23 December 2020, at the age of 89.

== Sources ==
- Schutt-Ainé, Patricia (1994). Haiti: A Basic Reference Book. Miami, Florida: Librairie Au Service de la Culture. p. 112. ISBN 0-9638599-0-0.
