= Institut de Sauvegarde du Patrimoine National =

Haitian Institute

The Institut de Sauvegarde du Patrimoine National (ISPAN), the Haitian Institute for the Protection of National Heritage, was founded in 1979 and has since been active. In addition to the extensive restorations at the Citadelle Henry, the Sans-Souci Palace, the Cathedral of Cap-Haïtien, Fort Jacques de Fermathe and the National Palace in Port-au-Prince, ISPAN undertook numerous studies and investigations that have resulted in a list with more than a thousand properties of cultural value located throughout Haiti. In 1994, ISPAN managed to officially rank thirty-three historical monuments and the historic center of Cap-Haïtien under National Heritage. This was an important step towards an active and effective management by the state.

== 2010 Earthquake ==
In the January 12, 2010 earthquake many monuments and historic buildings were damaged or destroyed. The most famous of these is the National Palace, which will be renovated when possible. Many churches have been partly destroyed, and will not be renovated due to the extensiveness of the destruction or due to the lack of funding. The Hyppolite market was already largely destroyed in a fire in 2008, and the earthquake further damaged the historical structure. However, this market will be completely renovated in a privately funded project. Although the government has different priorities following the earthquake, ISPAN is still actively protecting Haitian heritage spread over the country.

== Web page ==
https://ispan.gouv.ht/
