= Rose-Marie Desruisseau =

Haitian painter

- Born: 1933
- Died: 1988 (aged 54–55)
- Known for: Painting
- Awards: Jacques Roumain first prize, (1974)

Rose-Marie Desruisseau (August 30, 1933 – 1988) was a Haitian painter. Born in Port-au-Prince, Desruisseau won many awards in Haiti for her works, which have been exhibited in Senegal, Venezuela, Santo Domingo, the United States, Canada, and Martinique. After gaining an interest in Vodou in the 1960s, Desruisseau began to include themes of Vodou in her work. Having studied ethnography from 1967 to 1972, Desruisseau taught at the Academy of Fine Arts in 1977. Desruisseau's painting "Delivrance" was awarded the Jacques Roumain first prize in 1974. One of Rose-Marie's painting was also presented in the Kalliope: a Journal of women's art journal.
