= Castera Bazile =

Haitian painter

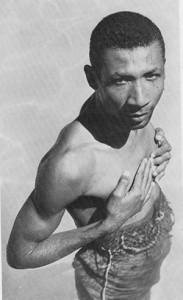
Castera Bazile

Castera Bazile (7 October 1923 – 27 February 1966) was a Haitian painter. Born in Jacmel, Bazile painted several murals in the Holy Trinity Cathedral in Port-au-Prince. He won the grand prize at the Caribbean International Competition in 1955.

Bazile died of tuberculosis in 1966 in Port-au-Prince, age 42.
