= Maurice Borno =

Haitian painter

Maurice Borno (1917–1955) was a Haitian painter. Born in Port-au-Prince, Borno attended school in Haiti, New York City, and Paris. He was a founding member of the Centre d'Art and is considered a pioneer of Haitian art.
