= Hector Hyppolite =

Haitian painter (1894–1948)

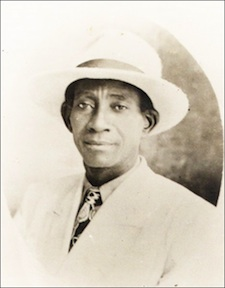
- Hector Hyppolite
- Born: 1894; Saint-Marc, Haiti
- Died: 1948 (aged 53–54); Port-au-Prince, Haiti
- Known for: Painting
- Style: Naïve art and Haitian Vodou themes
- Movement: Haitian art
- Patrons: DeWitt Peters; André Breton

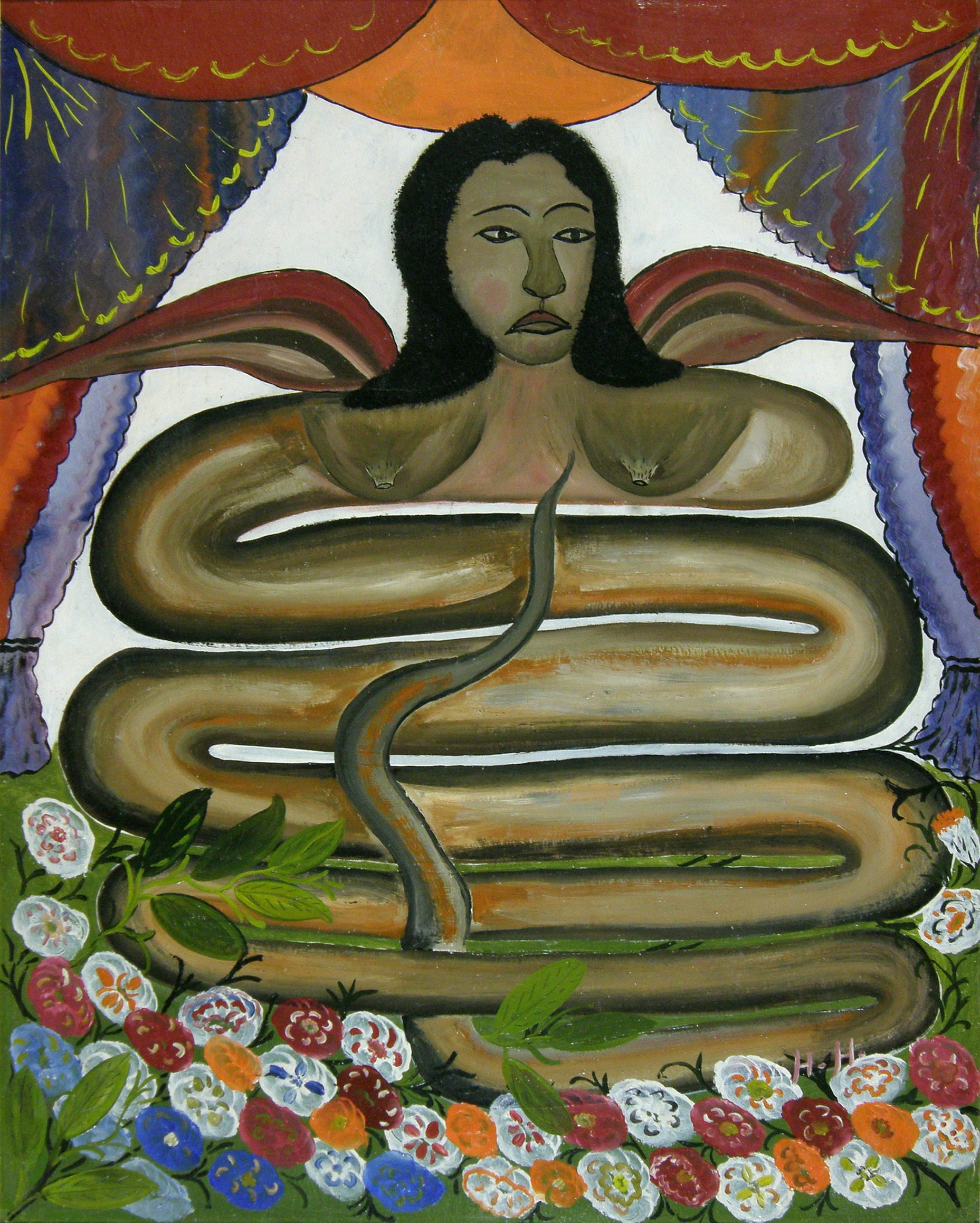
Damballah La Flambeau

Hector Hyppolite (1894–1948) was a Haitian painter. Considered as the "Grand Maître of Haitian Art" Born in Saint-Marc, Hyppolite was a third generation Vodou priest, or oungan. He also made shoes and painted houses before taking up fine art painting, which he did untrained. Hyppolite spent five years outside of Haiti from 1915 to 1920. His travels abroad included trips to New York and Cuba. Although he later claimed those years had been spent in Africa, such as Dahomey and Ethiopia, scholars regard that as more likely an instance of promotional myth-making than factual.

Hyppolite's talent as an artist was noticed by Philippe Thoby-Marcelin, who brought him to Haiti's capital Port-au-Prince in 1946. There, Hyppolite worked in the studio run by DeWitt Peters, a water-colorist and schoolteacher from the United States who had come to Haiti to teach the English language as part of the Good Neighbor Policy. In 1944, Peters opened an art center in the capital that provided free materials. Before arriving at the Centre d'Art Hyppolite had painted upon cardboard using chicken feathers and sold to visiting United States Marines because he owned no brushes. Peters had first noticed Hyppolite's work in 1943 on the exterior doors of a bar in Montrouis, which Hyppolite had painted with flower and bird designs. Flowers could represent attributes of deities in Vodou symbolism, and although the doors had not been explicitly religious Hyppolite recognized interest in Vodou among art buyers and incorporated Vodou themes into his work during his time at Peters's studio.

André Breton, a leading surrealist, traveled to Haiti in 1945 with Cuban artist Wifredo Lam. Lam purchased two of Hyppolite's paintings; Breton purchased five paintings and wrote about Hyppolite's work in Surrealism and Painting. Although Breton included Hyppolite among surrealists, Hyppolite's work was more realistic and religious than an effort to reproduce dream imagery. Nonetheless, Breton's regard for Hyppolite's work brought Hyppolite and Haitian painting to a wider audience. In January 1947 Hyppolite exhibited at a UNESCO exhibition in Paris and received an enthusiastic reception. The United States writer Truman Capote praised Hyppolite's painting "because there's nothing in it that has been slyly transposed".

Hyppolite, a prolific painter, typically depicted Vodou scenes and created between 250 and 600 paintings during the last three years of his life. Much of his work was influenced by his devotion to his work as a priest. However, after retiring from his work as a houngan, his work reflected the darker aspects of Haitian vodoo. He died at about age 54 in Port-au-Prince.

Several examples of Hyppolite's work are part of the Milwaukee Art Museum Haitian Art Collection and can be seen on the Haitian Art Society's website.

== Major works ==
- Maitresse Erzulie (circa 1945–1948)
- Damballah La Flambeau (circa 1945–1948)
- Triple-eyed Magician (circa 1945–1948)
- La Mulâtresse (circa 1945–1948)
