= Axe murder =

Murder in which the victim was struck and killed by an axe, hatchet or billhook

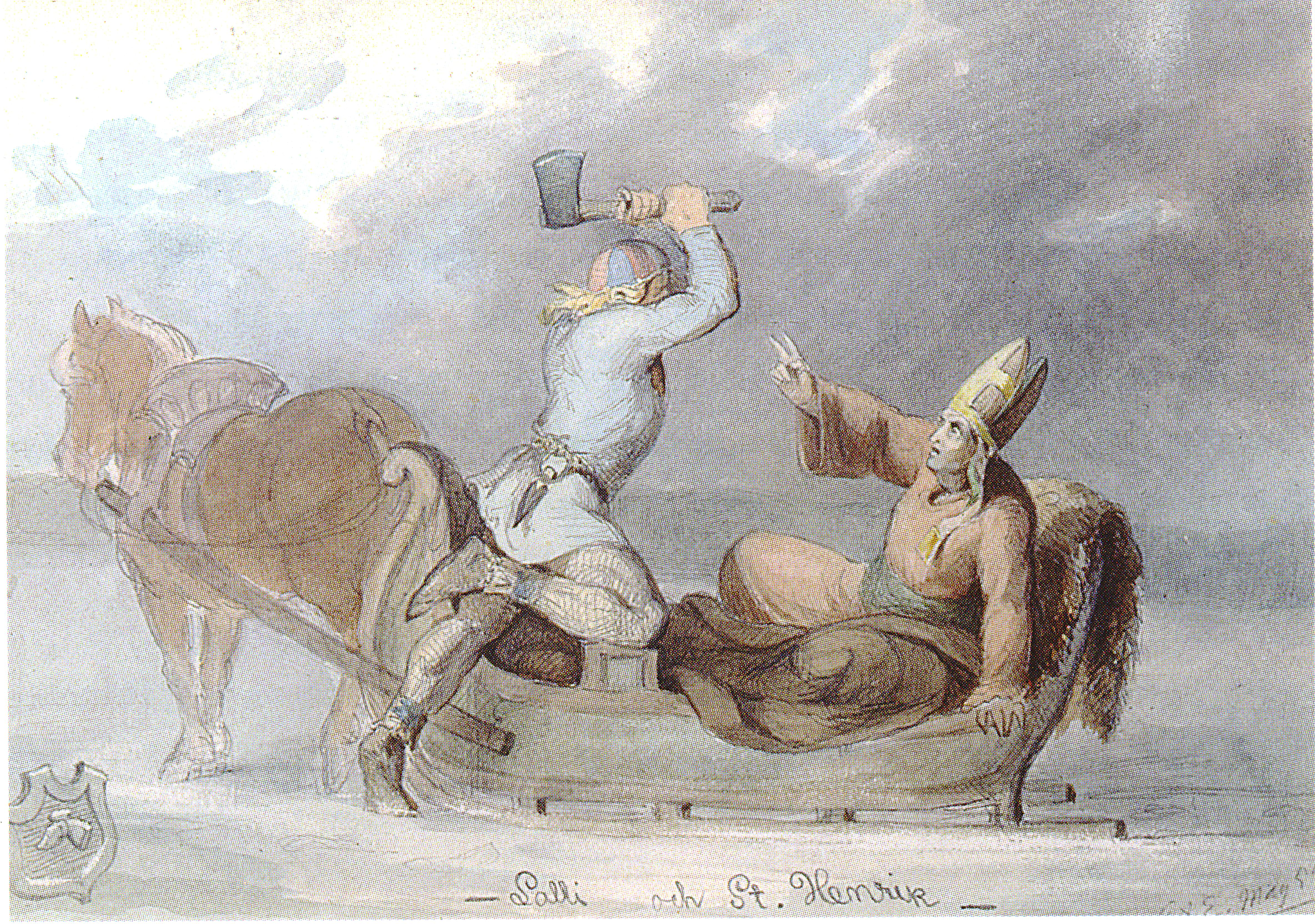
According to legend, a man called Lalli killed Bishop Henry with an axe on the ice of Lake Köyliö in 1156. The murder of St. Henry by Lalli, painting by Karl Anders Ekman (1854).

An axe murder is a murder in which the victim was struck and killed by an axe or hatchet.

== List of axe murders ==
The following are some notable cases.

- Lucius Tarquinius Priscus, fifth King of Rome, was assassinated by the sons of Ancus Marcius in 579 BC.
- Wenno von Rohrbach, the first Master of the Livonian Brothers of the Sword, was killed by the knight Wickbert with an axe in a quarrel, 1209.
- Mary Russell murders, in which the ship's captain William Stewart dispatched seven members of his crew with a crowbar and axe, 1828.
- Frankie Stewart Silver, first woman executed by the U.S. state of North Carolina, for the murder of her husband Charles, 1833.
- Helen Jewett was a prostitute in New York City who was allegedly murdered by Richard P. Robinson. He was tried and acquitted in 1836.
- John Lynch was nicknamed the "Berrima Axe Murderer" for his killing of the Mulligan family in 1841.
- The Smuttynose Island murders in 1873, in which Louis Wagner was tried, convicted, and hanged for the murder of two Norwegian immigrant women. One was killed with a chair and the other with an axe, on an island off the coast of Maine.
- The Harlson family murders, Nebraska outlaw and serial killer Stephen D. Richards murdered Mary Harlson and her three children with an axe while they were sleeping on the morning of 3 November 1878. Richards was later captured and executed on 26 April 1879.
- Vacelet family murders, in which Jean Desire Vacelet, his wife Victoire, and his sons Francis and John were murdered by an axe wielding assailant in Vincennes, Indiana on 24 October 1878, allegedly by Alsace immigrant Pierre Provost, who committed suicide in his jail cell.
- An unidentified serial killer known as Servant Girl Annihilator committed eight murders, mostly those of young women, with an axe in Austin, Texas in 1884 and 1885. These murders are also nicknamed the "Austin axe murders".
- Woolfolk murders, in which a Georgia man named Tom Woolfolk murdered nine members of his family with his axe in the early morning hours of August 6, 1887. He was convicted of the murders and executed in 1890.
- The Fall River axe murders, Lizzie Borden was charged and tried for the hatchet murders of her father and stepmother in 1892. The court and jury found her not guilty, and the murder remains unsolved to this day.
- Meeks family murders, in which Gus Meeks, 33, and his family, wife Delora (30), and daughters Hattie (4) and Mary (18 months) were murdered near Jenkins Cemetery in Browning, Missouri (one daughter Nellie, escaped), on 18 May 1894.
- Simola croft massacre, the axe murders on 10 May 1899 in Klaukkala, Finland, when a croft family of seven was murdered by their farmworker Karl Malmelin.
- 1909 Savannah axe murders
- Lord George Sanger, English showman and circus proprietor, murdered with a hatchet at his home by employee Herbert Charles Cooper, for unknown reasons; Cooper subsequently committed suicide, 1911.
- Ardenwald axe murders, 1911
- Villisca axe murders, 1912.
- Axeman of New Orleans, a serial killer active in New Orleans, Louisiana (and surrounding communities, including Gretna, Louisiana), from May 1918 to October 1919.
- Paul Mueller traveled through the United States between 1898 and 1912, murdering families with axes and similar idiosyncrasies and location. Bill James, in his book The Man from the Train, proposes him as the prime suspect for the Villisca axe murders again due it having idiosyncrasies and geographical patterns to other murders attributed Mueller. He is possibly one of the most prolific serial killers in American history. His German origins and timelines also make him a suspect to the Hinterkaifeck murders.
- The 1922 Hinterkaifeck murders.
- Karl Denke of Munsterberg, Germany (now Ziębice, Poland). Arrested in 1924 for attacking a man with a hatchet; the victim survived. Believed to have killed and eaten 42 men. He committed suicide two days after his arrest.
- Eva Dugan, only woman executed by hanging by the state of Arizona for murder of chicken rancher Andrew Mathis, 1927.
- John Barcoski, murdered by being beaten to death with pick-axes by the Coal and Iron Police 9 February 1929.
- Victor Licata, who killed his father, mother, two brothers, and a sister with an axe in Tampa, Florida.
- John Frederick Stockwell, who confessed to the murder of cinema manager Dudley Hoard in London, United Kingdom and was executed in 1934.
- Leon Trotsky, assassinated with an ice axe by Soviet agent Ramón Mercader, 1940.
- Toivo Koljonen murdered a family of six with an axe and became the last Finn executed for a civilian crime, 1943.
- The Kludt murders, in which Jake Bird was convicted and executed for the axe murders of Bertha Kludt (age 52) and her daughter Beverly June (17) in Tacoma, Washington, 1947.
- Yaroslav Halan, Soviet Ukrainian anti-Fascist writer, killed with an axe by Ukrainian nationalists in his home office, 1949.
- Elifasi Msomi a.k.a. The Axe Killer, a South African serial killer who was convicted and executed by hanging for 15 murders, 1955.
- Troy axe murders, 1964
- Buffalo Narrows murders, 1969
- Smallwood, New York New Years Day axe murders. 1 January 1964. Frank Scaramuzzo aged 24 killed Joseph McAdam age 49, and Judith Meddaugh age 19 and attempted to kill Florence McAdam age 20 in Smallwood, Sullivan County NY. While the 3 were out celebrating the New Year Mr Scaramuzzo a serviceman who had received a "dear John letter" a few months before from Ms McAdam entered the McAdam home through the basement. He found an axe in the basement and waited in a closet until his victims returned home. After Mr McAdam and the girls returned home they sat in the kitchen for almost an hour before retiring. He killed Mr McAdam with the axe in his first floor bedroom then he went upstairs to the girls bedroom and attacked the sleeping girls, killing Ms Meddaugh with the axe. He strangled Ms McAdam until he thought she was dead then he called the police.
- Raymonde Jouhanno murdered her husband and three children in France with an axe in 1971. She subsequently committed suicide by jumping into a well.
- Candy Montgomery was acquitted of the axe murder of her lover's wife, Betty Gore, which occurred on 13 June 1980. Montgomery was found not guilty in self-defense, despite striking Gore 41 times.
- Kumudini boat massacre, an incident in which at least 23 minority Sri Lankan Tamil men, women and children on a ferry boat named Kumudini sailing from the island of Delft to the island of Nainathievu were alleged to have been hacked to death with a hatchet by Sri Lankan Navy personnel, 1985.
- Daniel Morgan, British private investigator who was investigating police corruption, found dead with an axe wound to the back of his head, 1987.
- In December 1990, during a gang clash at Marsiling, Singapore, a 20-year-old bystander and Malaysian citizen Sivapragasam Subramaniam was struck by an axe and he died from fatal head injuries. Sagar Suppiah Retnam, the leader of one of the gangs involved, was identified as the one who killed Sivapragasam, and he was caught three years later in Malaysia. Sagar was sentenced to death in May 1994, and he was hanged on 7 July 1995, while 13 members of Sagar’s gang were arrested and jailed between 31 months and seven years for rioting and causing grievous hurt.
- In November 1992, 32-year-old odd-job worker and moneylender Tan Heng Hong was lured into a hospital room by two men under the pretext of buying gold, and Tan was killed by both men who fatally slashed his neck with an axe. Between 1993 and 1995, the two perpetrators, S. S. Asokan and Maniam Rathinswamy, were arrested and sentenced to hang for murder. Both men were hanged on 8 September 1995.
- In October 1993, two patrons of a coffee shop in Singapore’s Little India were attacked by a group of three gang members armed with weapons. One of the two victims, 34-year-old airport operation assistant Thampusamy Murugian Gunasekaran, died after being struck by an axe. Anbuarsu Joseph, who was responsible for killing Thampusamy with the axe, was caught and sentenced to death in 1994, and he was hanged on 7 July 1995, but the remaining two perpetrators of the attack were never caught till today.
- The Night of the Pitchforks, an incident in which Israeli Arab guerrillas from the Wadi Ara area, members of the Islamic movement, infiltrated into an IDF military recruit training base near Kibbutz Gal'ed in the Plain of Manasseh, and killed three Israeli soldiers with axes, knives and a pitchfork, 1992.
- Mikhail Popkov, a Russian policeman and a serial killer known as "Angarsk maniac", murdered 77 women and one man in the areas of Angarsk, Irkutsk and Vladivostok between 1992 and 2010. While killing people, he used an axe along with other instruments and objects as a weapon. Popkov was arrested in 2012 and sentenced to life imprisonment twice in 2015 and 2018.
- Greenough Family Massacre, the axe murders of Karen MacKenzie, 31, and her three children, Daniel 16, Amara, 7, and Katrina, 5, at their remote rural property in Greenough, Western Australia, 400 km north of Perth, on 21 February 1993, by William Patrick Mitchell, 1993.
- Boo Tiang Huat, a Singaporean police officer who was struck on the axe by a man during his routine spot check in 1994. The killer, Zainal Abidin Abdul Malik, was found guilty of murdering Boo and hanged on 30 August 1996.
- Ramil Safarov, an Azerbaijani soldier who hacked to death and almost decapitated an Armenian soldier during a NATO Partnership for Peace training in Budapest. Hungary returned him to Azerbaijan in 2012, where he was immediately pardoned and given a hero's welcome, and causing an international incident.
- Murder of Peter Porco, on 15 November 2004, Peter and Joan Porco were discovered having been attacked with an axe in their Delmar, NY, home. Peter died of his injuries while Joan survived. Their son Christopher was convicted of the crime in 2006; the prosecution relied on various sightings of his distinctive yellow Jeep to argue that he had traveled several hours from Rochester, NY, where he was attending college at the time, to Delmar and back again that night to commit the murder.
- Anthony Walker, a Black British student from Huyton, Liverpool, was murdered with an ice axe by Michael Barton and his cousin, Paul Taylor, in 2005.
- South African rugby player Joseph Ntshongwana was arrested in 2011 and jailed in 2014 for hacking three men to death and wounding a fourth with an axe to avenge the gang-rape and subsequent HIV infection of his daughter.
- Tyree Smith, alleged murderer and cannibal, was arrested in Connecticut in 2012 for murdering a homeless man with a hatchet and then eating parts of his body.
- Henri van Breda, convicted South African murderer. Authorities believe he killed his father, mother and older brother and attempted to kill his younger sister who survived the attack in January 2015. Henri van Breda was found guilty of murder and attempted murder on 21 May 2018 by the Western Cape High Court.
- Arthur Bonifas and Mark Barrett, U.S. Army soldiers, were killed in the Korean Demilitarized Zone by North Korean forces by their own axes they were using to trim trees in what was called the Korean axe murder incident.
- The Man from the Train, killed entire families in their sleep, arriving and departing by train. Alleged existence (and possible but far from proven identity) hypothesized over 100 years after the murders, by analysis of contemporary records, showing a supposedly common modus operandi for many unconnected murders.
- River Valley High School attack in Singapore, in which a 16-year-old teenager from River Valley High School, Singapore murdered his 13-year-old schoolmate Ethan Hun Zhe Kai with an axe, which the accused allegedly purchased online, at school. The victim's body was later found in a toilet and the 16-year-old was charged with murder. The accused was mentally ill and attempted suicide in 2019 and later he was remanded for psychiatric evaluation. The perpetrator was later convicted of manslaughter and sentenced to 16 years in prison.
- Jordan Poole killed his roommate and attacked his brother with a hatchet in Payson, Utah shortly before midnight on 22 December 2023. When questioned by police, "Jordan admitted to seeing a flash of light, then voices told him he needed to take care of 'them.' Jordan stated he knew what he needed to do so he grabbed a hatchet and started swinging. Jordan stated he hit Marcus multiple times in the head with the hatchet because he kept getting up and was afraid Marcus was going to attack him," according to the affidavit.

== Image gallery ==
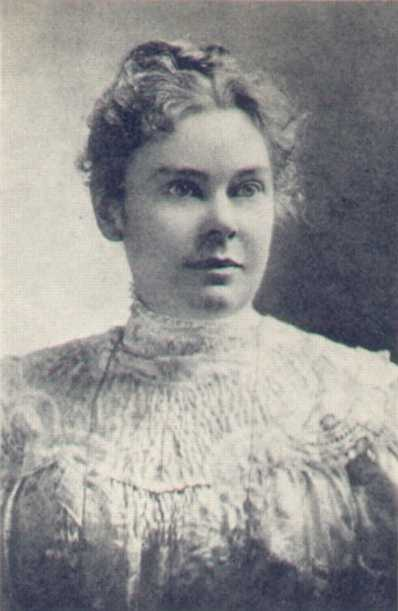
Lizzie Borden, about 1889

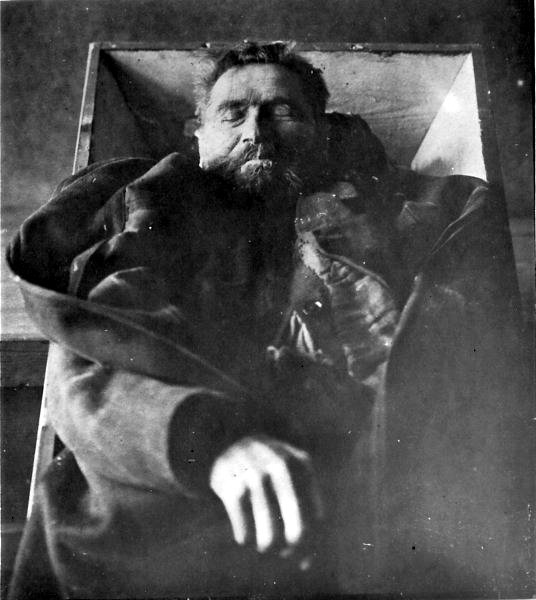
Police photo of Karl Denke after his suicide by hanging on 22 December 1924 (aged 64)

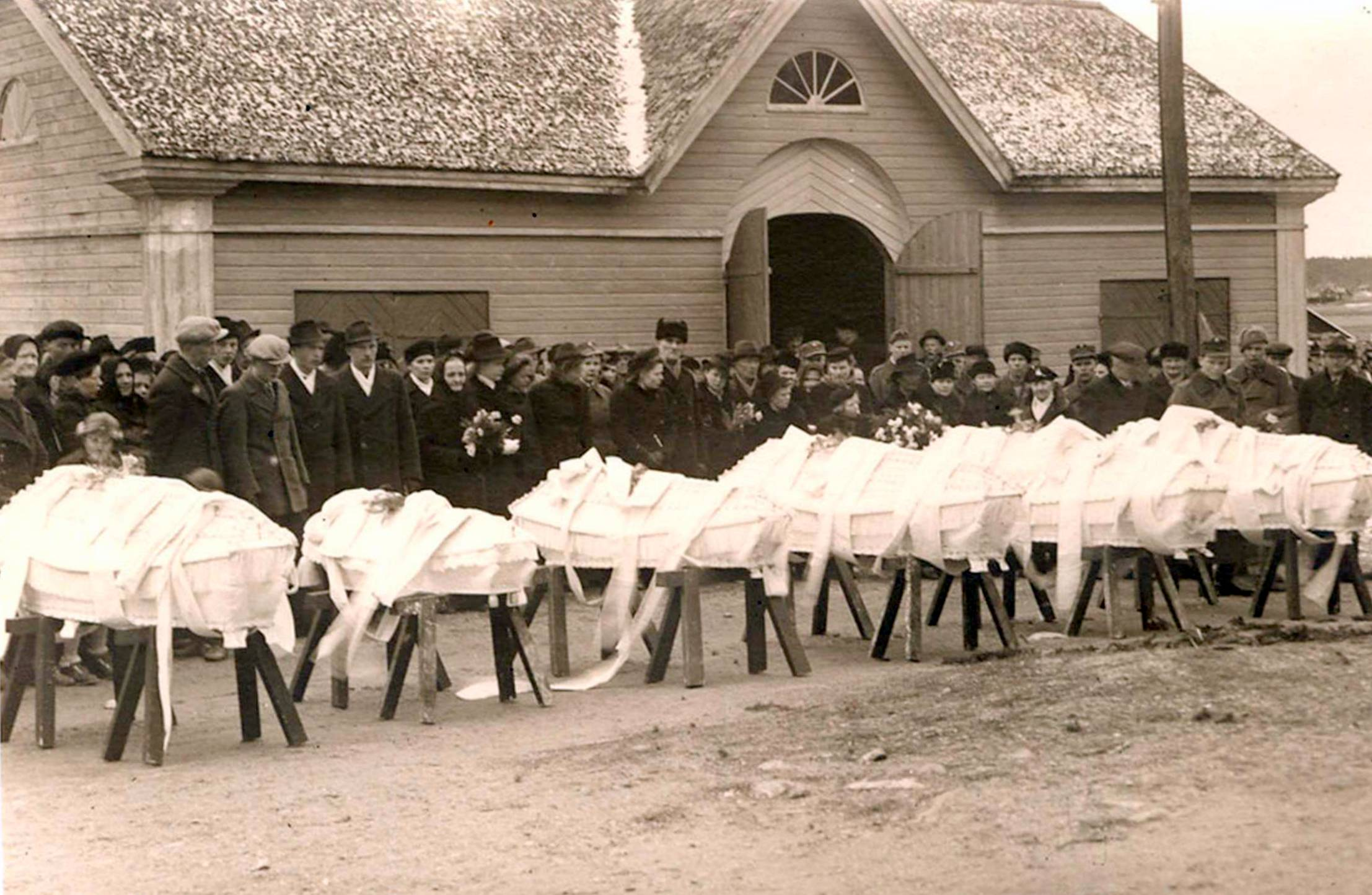
Funeral for the six victims of Toivo Koljonen on 4 April 1943
