= Hadriana in All My Dreams =

1988 Haitian magical realism novel by René Depestre

- French edition cover
- Author: René Depestre
- Original title: Hadriana dans tous mes rêves
- Translator: Kaiama L. Glover
- Language: French
- Genre: Marvelous realism
- Publisher: Gallimard (French edition); Akashic Books (English edition)
- Publication date: 1988
- English publication date: 2017
- Pages: 195 (French edition); 160 (English edition)
- Awards: Prix Renaudot
- ISBN: 978-2-07-071255-7 (original French, 1988); ISBN 978-1-617-75533-0 (English, 2017)

Hadriana in All My Dreams (French: Hadriana dans tous mes rêves) is a 1988 novel by Haitian author René Depestre. Set in Jacmel, Haiti, and spanning a period of 40 years, the plot follows a young French woman, Hadriana Siloé, who is turned into a zombie on her wedding day. The novel explores themes of colonialism, exile, and sexuality.

The novel was published by French publishing house Gallimard in 1988; it was met with acclaim. It won the Prix Renaudot that same year, becoming the first novel by a Haitian writer to do so, won multiple other literary awards, and sold close to 200,000 copies within five years. The novel has been praised for its writing style, atmosphere, and treatment of social issues; conversely, it has been criticized for its depiction of Haiti and treatment of gender-related issues and sexuality. An English translation by Kaiama L. Glover was published by Akashic Books in 2017.

== Background ==
Depestre was born in Jacmel in 1926. He began his creative career in 1945, with the publication of his poetry collection Étincelles. Using the money from the sales, he established and began editing a Marxist newspaper, La Ruche, alongside Jacques Stephen Alexis, Théodore Baker, and Gérald Bloncourt. Their activities led to their arrest by then-president Élie Lescot; their arrest led to what would become a nationwide strike that removed Lescot from power. Subsequently, Depestre was exiled from Haiti in 1946. He then briefly lived in France, Czechoslovakia, Brazil, Argentina, China, Russia, and Vietnam. He arrived in Cuba by invitation of Che Guevara in 1959 and spent almost two decades there, before ultimately settling in France in 1978.

The original concept for Hadriana dated back to the late 1970s, when Depestre still resided in Cuba. His relationship with the Cuban government had worsened, and he began to reflect on his youth in Haiti. The novel was completed in 1987 and was published a year later by Gallimard. Depestre drew on his childhood memories of Haitian Vodou to write the novel. Originally, Hadriana's name was spelled Adriana, and she was meant to be black; Depestre found this narrative too traditional, and he changed the spelling of his protagonist's name and made her white. According to Depestre, this decision was intended to subvert the myth of zombification. Depestre struggled with writing the novel due to its connections with death; he desired to write a book where death was not associated with sorrow or despair, but rather with gaiety. According to Depestre, the protagonist was based on two people from his past: one of them was a woman he personally knew, who had reportedly been zombified; the other was a wealthy French girl whom he saw through the window of her manor. Critics have marked the novel as part of Depestre's rejection of his former revolutionary politics. In an interview with Joan Dayan, Depestre stated that in writing Hadriana, he had intentionally distanced himself from his former politics.

== Synopsis ==
=== Part 1 ===
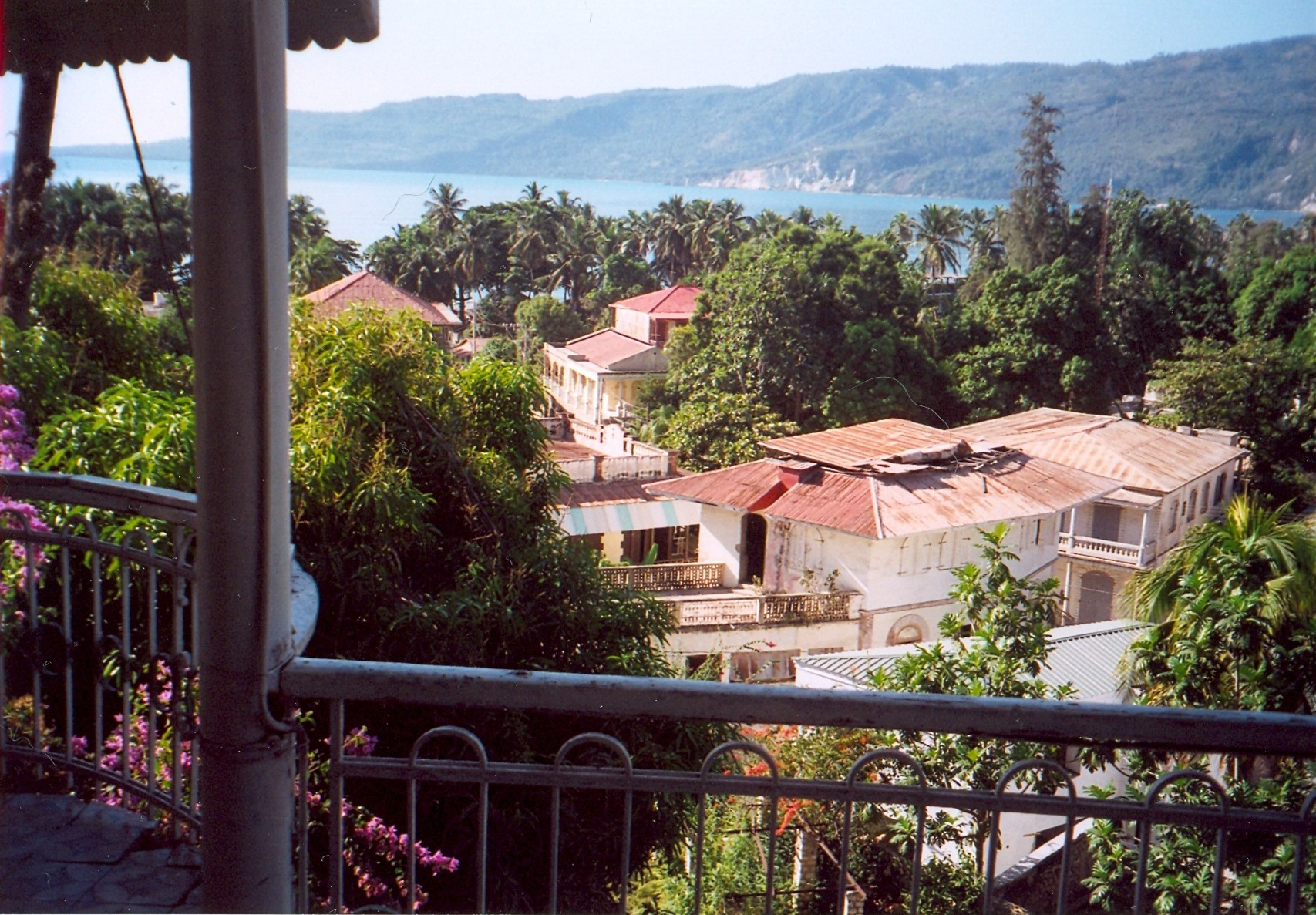
Jacmel, Depestre's birth city, and the setting for the novel

The story begins in January 1938, with a dead woman being driven to her funeral; the locals call this phenomenon an "auto-zombie". The dead woman is Germaine Villaret-Joyeuse, the godmother of both the narrator Patrick Altamont and a young French girl, Hadriana Siloé. Some time before, Germaine had requested a butterfly mask to be placed on her face upon her death. According to local legend, this butterfly mask is actually a human, Balthazar Granchiré, transformed by the witch doctor Okil Okilon and hiding with Okilon's rival, Papa Rosalvo Rosanfer. Granchiré had reportedly preyed on young women in their sleep before meeting Germaine. He had promised her they would go to heaven together, but has now shifted his attention to Hadriana, who is to be married soon.

On her wedding day, Hadriana suddenly dies. The manbo Brévica Losange claims that Hadriana's death was caused by Balthazar Granchiré. The local Catholic priests wish to cancel the carnival that is meant to take place on the same day, but are unable, especially after Patrick's mother declares that Hadriana had told her that she wanted her funeral to be celebrated with a carnival. After many strange and supernatural happenings at the carnival (including a moment where the dead girl's face seems to be replaced with that of an old woman) and a ceremony performed by Madame Losange intended to protect her from Granchiré, Hadriana is buried.

A few days afterward, it is discovered that Hadriana's grave is empty, leading everyone to the realization that she did not truly die; she has been zombified.

=== Part 2 ===
Over thirty years have passed since the disappearance of Hadriana Siloé; since that time, Jacmel has fallen into ruin. Patrick Altamont has become a professor, and spends his time lecturing and traveling the world. He constantly thinks about Jacmel and Hadriana. In his mind, he conducts an imaginary interview with a journalist, where he relates the legend of Hadriana and how she knocked at the doors of Jacmel, including his door, but out of fear nobody would open their doors to her. He plans to write an essay on the Siloé affair, in which he offers several explanations on the origins of zombies, and wonders if zombies are a metaphor for the life of African slaves, and the Haitian people who cannot fight against their fate.

In May 1977, while Patrick is in Jamaica, he notices a woman and recognizes her as Hadriana. They spend the night together, and she tells him her story.

=== Part 3 ===
Hadriana recounts her life up to the day of her wedding. On the day of the wedding, she consumes a mysterious drink, likely poisoned by Balthazar Granchiré; this causes her to fall into a death-like stupor, but still retain her mental capacity and senses of hearing and touch. Papa Rosanfer, who had provided sanctuary to Granchiré, wakes her up from her stupor and attempts to make her his sex slave. However, she escapes from him. She knocks on the doors of her friends and neighbors in Jacmel, but no one is willing to help her. Ultimately, she makes her way to Jamaica in February 1938 and begins a new life.

In an epilogue, Patrick informs the reader that 10 years have passed since their reunion in Jamaica, and they have lived happily together ever since.

== Characters ==
- Hadriana Siloé, born to white French parents but raised in Haiti. On the day of her wedding, she is poisoned and turned into a zombie. Her surname is the French form of the word Siloam.
- Patrick Altamont, the narrator of the novel. He is Hadriana's godbrother. As an adult, he becomes a professor.
- Germaine Villaret-Joyeuse, the godmother of both Patrick and Hadriana, who is rumoured to have seven sets of loins.
- Balthazar Granchiré, a satyriasic man-turned-butterfly, rumoured to prey on young women. In Haitian Creole, chiré literally means "tear" or "gash"; his name is an allusion to the penetration of genitalia.
- Okil Okilon, a witch doctor who had transformed Granchiré into a butterfly. His name is a reference to a character from Jacques Stephen Alexis' novel Compère Général Soleil, and comes from the English word "kill". Okilon had previously appeared in Depestre's 1982 work Alléluia pour une femme-jardin.
- Madame Brévica Losange, a well-respected manbo in Jacmel.
- Papa Rosanfer, a witch doctor, and the rival of Okil Okilon. His given name, Rosalvo, references Rosalvo Bobo, a Haitian politician and revolutionary active prior to the U.S. occupation of the country.

== Analysis ==
=== Colonialism and the zombie allegory ===
The novel is a response to the Westernized depiction of zombies. The belief in zombies originates from Haitian Vodou, a syncretic religion of African and European beliefs that is often misunderstood by Westerners. In 1932, the film White Zombie was released, featuring a white woman who visits Haiti and suffers an attempt by a witch doctor to zombify her. The film popularized stereotypical assumptions in the Western imagination about Haiti and zombies. Depestre parodies White Zombie by featuring a white woman, raised in Haiti, who falls victim to zombification. Similar to the Haitians in White Zombie, the Jacmelian community is fascinated by a white woman and idealize her for her whiteness.

The relation of Haitians to the French and to their own culture is a major theme explored in the novel. The people of Jacmel idealize and objectify Hadriana due to her whiteness, associating her with purity, and view her marriage to one of the black members of Jacmel as a blessing. Later, they abandon Hadriana after she undergoes zombification, something uniquely Haitian, as they no longer see her as pure and thus do not need her. The theme of Western Catholicism versus indigenous Vodou practices also manifests in Hadriana: when Hadriana dies, the Catholic priest demands that a French woman be given a Christian funeral, however, the Haitians desire to celebrate Hadriana with a carnival; ultimately, the carnival is celebrated.

Hadriana has also been described as an exoticist novel, and a product of Depestre's attempt to compensate for his loss of his native nation. Munro argues that Depestre in the novel expresses his alienation from Haitian culture, his yearning for the Haiti of his youth, and his perception of Haiti since his exile as a place of violence and superstition. Pessini writes that in trying to find Hadriana, Patrick himself turns into a "zombie-writer"; she connects Patrick, exiled from Jacmel, to Depestre himself.

=== The role of Hadriana ===
Hadriana is widely interpreted as representing Haiti. Salien argues that Depestre intended to create a character who "would embody the resistance and survival of Haiti". Benedicty-Kokken writes that although Hadriana is ethnically French, the text emphasizes that she is part of the Caribbean. Additionally, the text references the lwas Nana Buluku, Simbi, and Gede in connection to Hadriana. Hadriana's fate of zombification is described by Patrick as akin to the fate of slavery suffered by Haitians in colonial Haiti.

Depestre stated that Hadriana was not meant to represent anything, and that his only intention had been to write a love story. Depestre also claimed that by making his zombie a white woman rather than a black woman, he breaks with the trope in Haitian literature that victims of zombification must be black. Dayan takes the opposite view, writing that the zombification of Hadriana tells "a story that promotes the comfortable illusion that a white can take on the burden of blacks, symbolically redeeming those who are finally irredeemable."

Hadriana's sexuality and individuality is also given significant focus in the book. She recounts several sexual encounters she had, including an encounter with one of her female friends, before her wedding night. This is put in juxtaposition with how the city of Jacmel idealizes Hadriana as a virgin saint. Hadriana, however, rejects this perception of her and after escaping from zombification, decides to live her life according to her own desires. Glover writes that Hadriana is Depestre's rejection of the sacrifice of individual liberty. Rather than have Hadriana be at the mercy of those that need or want something from her, such as the people of Jacmel or Papa Rosanfer, she gains the freedom to choose her own fate. Blanchaud describes Hadriana as part of a tradition in Depestre's oeuvre of protagonists that lead them to harmony with themselves and the world around them.

== Reception ==
The novel was received enthusiastically by Francophone audiences. Hadriana in All My Dreams won the Prix Renaudot in 1988. It was the first time a Haitian writer ever won the Prix Renaudot, and the first time a novel by a Haitian writer won a major French literary award. Hadriana also won the 1988 prizes for "Best Novel" from the Société des gens de lettres and the Royal Academy of Science, Letters and Fine Arts of Belgium. By 1993, it had sold nearly 200,000 copies. French filmmaker Jean Rouch wanted to create a film adaptation of Hadriana, but this idea was rejected by Depestre and Gallimard. It has been translated into at least seven languages. Among them, an English edition by Kaiama L. Glover was published by Akashic Books in 2017.

Hadriana in All My Dreams received praise for its poetic writing, atmosphere, and treatment of social issues. Glover's translation of the novel into English also received praise from reviewers. Kirkus Reviews gave it a starred review and praised the atmosphere and translation. It likewise received starred reviews from Library Journal and Booklist, the latter of which called it a "ribald and colorful yet strangely haunting novel" and praised Depestre's discussion of social issues and Glover's translation. An initial review described it as leaving "an important mark in the trajectory of the Haitian novel". It has been described as a classic of Haitian literature.

Haitian-American novelist Edwidge Danticat took inspiration from Hadriana to publish her own book about Jacmel, and has expressed her admiration for the book. In a foreword written for the novel, Danticat stated "The fact that we continue to be bombarded with the same old pedestrian zombie narratives written by foreigners and featuring Haitians makes this novel even more crucial." Bogi Takács in an article for Tor.com praised the novel's complexity and treatment of social issues. Ben Fountain named the novel as one of his top ten books about Haiti.

The novel has been criticized for its depiction of Haiti and treatment of gender-related issues and sexuality. Joan Dayan wrote that Hadriana is an idealization that contributes to false generalizations about the country and concluded: "Depestre abandons the inhabitants of Haiti to their fate, apparently forgetting their continued struggles against dictatorship, repression, and poverty. All that remains of his Haiti is a portrait of black, poor, apathetic husks of humanity, who can never awake into freedom." Dayan also criticized what she perceived as Depestre's perpetration of rape culture. Lizabeth Paravisini-Gebert criticized the novel for its perceived sexist attitudes and objectification of women and female sexuality; she also wrote that the narrative depicted Hadriana as being able to escape zombification due to being white and wealthy, while simultaneously depicting Haitians as not being able to escape zombification due to being black and poor. Katell Colin-Thébaudeau argued that the novel is a depiction of Haiti written for a Western audience and portrays Haiti in an exoticist manner. Kristen Lokowich wrote of Depestre's literature, including Hadriana, that Depestre does not give his female characters identities of their own, and that his female characters mostly serve to fulfill the fantasies of his male characters.
