= History Detectives =

American public television documentary series (2003–2014)

- Created by: Oregon Public Broadcasting/Lion Television
- Starring: Wes Cowan (Auctioneer, appraiser); Kaiama L. Glover (Professor of French history and literature); Elyse Luray (Appraiser, art historian); Eduardo Pagan (Professor of History, author); Gwen Wright (Professor of Architecture, author, architectural advisor); Tukufu Zuberi (Professor of Sociology, author)
- Opening theme: "Watching the Detectives" (2003-2013), original theme song (2014)
- Country of origin: United States
- No. of seasons: 11
- No. of episodes: 114

Production
- Running time: 55 minutes
- Production company: Lion Television

Original release
- Network: PBS
- Release: July 14, 2003 – July 22, 2014

History Detectives is an American documentary television series on PBS. It features investigations made by members of a small team of researchers to identify and/or authenticate items which may have historical significance or connections to important historical events, and to answer specific questions brought to them about these artifacts. Common subjects are family heirlooms and historical structures. Its stated missions are "exploring the complexities of historical mysteries, searching out the facts, myths and conundrums that connect local folklore, family legends and interesting objects."

Over its first decade, the series featured a team of several "detectives": originally Wes Cowan, Elyse Luray, Gwen Wright, and Tukufu Zuberi, later joined by Eduardo Pagán. Following a hiatus, the program returned in summer 2014 in a different format, with hosts Zuberi and Cowan joined by Kaiama Glover, as History Detectives: Special Investigations.

History Detectives was canceled in 2015.

== Format ==
Episodes usually include three segments, each centering on a single "mystery" or "case". Usually a case is handled by a single "detective", although in early episodes two would occasionally investigate a single case, and there are cases where a "detective" calls on one of their colleagues for help, usually when the case involves a specialty of their colleague's.

Each segment begins with a brief introduction and then shows the "detective" meeting with a person who brought the case to their attention. The cases always revolve around a physical object related in some manner to American history. Usually these are family heirlooms of some type, although occasionally they are public objects or landmarks or items owned by private archives or museums. The person presenting them with the case then shows the investigator the item in question and relates their understanding of how this item is connected to American history. Often this involves some element of folk history which had been handed down as family or local lore.

The investigator then asks them what they want to find out about the item and the owner will generally give them two or three central questions. Often the questions revolve around whether the item was owned by a particular famous personage or whether it was used in a particular historic event. Sometimes the investigator is asked to track down an obscure creator of a certain item. The investigator then promises to look into the questions and, if the item in question is portable, asks to take it with them.

The rest of the segment involves an investigation of the item's history, focusing particularly on the questions asked by the person who presented them with the case. If the provenance of the item is in doubt, they often begin by establishing whether or not the item came from the period in question. This often involves a series of physical tests as well as consultation with experts on appraisal. When tracking down specific people, the investigators engage in archival research using such resources as biographies, histories, newspapers, and city directories. In attempting to establish the history of the item, the investigators meet with experts, particularly historians, to gain historical context. When needed, other experts, such as park rangers, appraisers, and experts in relevant skills, are consulted. Often, experts are asked to provide their opinion on the plausibility of a story attached to the item, or to explain why a specific historical event happened in a particular way.

When dealing with more recent history, the investigators will often try and contact people involved in certain events both in order to gain context and to verify the truth of an item's folk history. Generally the last interview will be abruptly ended before the audience can learn the final revelation. The investigator then returns to the person who brought them the case and informs them of what he has learned, including rolling clips of revealing statements from the final expert consulted. Occasionally the end of the segment will involve a "reward" of sorts. Sometimes this involves presenting the people who brought them the case with an item somehow related to the history of their item. Other times this will involve a meeting with a person who had produced or previously owned their item or, if that person is deceased, their relatives. For example, in a case where they are trying to track down the artist who had drawn a World War II POW's picture, they find that the artist was deceased but they "reunited" the POW with the artist's son.

Between segments are interstitial material involving stock footage and one of the investigators giving narration that relates to the general topic which had been covered in the preceding segment. For example, a segment which deals with desegregation in Major League Baseball, the interstitial material discussed the World War II service of several black ballplayers.

The show only aired original episodes during the summer months. Reruns aired in some areas of the country the rest of the year, as well as on World. The sixth season in 2008 brought some changes including a new opening sequence. In the seventh season in 2009, Eduardo Pagan, a noted historian and author joined the detectives. The ninth season in 2011, marked a change from regularly airing on Mondays to Tuesdays. The tenth season premiered on July 17, 2012, with another new opening sequence. Also, the 10th-season premiere episode was their 100th of the series.

In 2014, the show changed its name to "History Detectives: Special Investigations" and debuted a new format. Joining Zuberi and Cowan was historian Kaiama Glover. In contrast to previous seasons, each episode of "History Detectives: Special Investigations" focuses on a single subject such as the Austin "Servant Girl Annihilator", the Sultana disaster, or the death of band leader Glenn Miller. The three hosts investigate different aspects of the incident and then reunite for a final report.

== Production ==
Elvis Costello's "Watching the Detectives" was the show's theme song for its first decade. The drum sequences also served as segues between each segment of an episode. In 2014, the show changed to an original composition for its theme music.

During an online chat with the Washington Post in 2005, Elyse Luray stated that each segment took approximately six weeks to complete. While on the show it appears that each filmed segment is happening spontaneously, the research is generally completed prior to filming, and the investigator will then later return to certain research points for filming so the investigation will appear as a coherent story for the viewer.

== History Detectives Kids ==
History Detectives also had a kids version on PBSKidsGo.org called History Detectives Kids. The site officially launched on June 21, 2004. The site closed around January 26, 2013.

== See also ==
- American Treasures, similar show on Discovery
