= 2009 Glynn County murders =

Eight murdered in Brunswick, Georgia, U.S.

Glynn County murders
- Location: Brunswick, Georgia, U.S.
- Date: August 29, 2009
- Attack type: Familicide, mass murder
- Weapon: Unknown blunt object
- Deaths: 8
- Injuries: 1
- Perpetrator: Guy Heinze Jr.

On August 29, 2009, seven dead bodies and two critically injured people were found in the New Hope Mobile Home Park in Glynn County, Georgia, near Brunswick. One of the two injured people died of the injuries the following day. Guy Heinze Jr., a 22-year-old member of the family, was convicted of the murders in 2013 and was sentenced to life imprisonment without parole.

== Murders ==
At approximately 8:15 am on August 29, 2009, police received a 9-1-1 call from a 22-year-old man, Guy Heinze Jr., reporting that his whole family had been beaten to death. On arrival at the trailer park, they found seven people dead and two others critically injured. One of those injured, 19-year-old Michael Toler, died the following day in the hospital. The other victims were Russell Toler Sr., 44, Russell Toler Jr., 20, Chrissy Toler, 20, Michelle Toler, 15, Brenda Flanagan, 49, Guy Heinze Sr., 45 and Joseph West, 30. The sole survivor was 3-year-old Byron Jimerson, the son of Chrissy Toler. On September 8, police stated that the victims had been beaten with a large instrument. They believed that three people committed the crime.

The murders gained international attention and were referred to as the worst mass murder case in Georgia state history.

== Arrest of Heinze ==
Police arrested Heinze on suspicion of tampering with evidence at the crime scene and on drug possession charges. Glynn County Police gave a press conference on August 30 in which they did not identify the other victims, but stated that their ages ranged from "older than infants to their mid-40s". Police chief Matt Doering said, "I wouldn't call Mr. Heinze a suspect, but I won't rule him out either."

== Trial ==
On September 14, 2009, Heinze was indicted by a grand jury, and prosecutors said they intended to seek the death penalty. In 2011, defense attorneys were given permission to observe DNA testing of a broken gun stock and other items recovered from the scene of the crimes. The judge originally assigned to the trial resigned in 2011 for reasons unrelated to the case. Heinze pleaded not guilty at an arraignment hearing on February 23, 2012. During the trial, the prosecution put forward the theory that drugs and money were the prime motivations for the murders. Heinze's defense countered that the investigation refused to consider other suspects in the killings. On October 25, 2013, Heinze was convicted of all eight murders and sentenced to life imprisonment with no chance of parole. Prosecutors decided not to seek the death penalty as part of a deal with the defense team when a juror was removed and replaced by a substitute.

On December 7, 2020, Heinze's conviction was upheld by the Supreme Court of Georgia.

== Media documentary ==
On March 24, 2014, parts of the trial were included in a televised UK BBC 3 documentary about the case; Judgement (Life and Death Row, series 1 episode 2).

== See also ==
- Woolfolk family murders, wherein Tom Woolfolk murdered nine members of his family with an axe in Bibb County, Georgia, in 1887
