= Wes Cowan =

American anthropologist, auctioneer, and appraiser of antiques

- Born: C. Wesley Cowan; September 4, 1951 (age 75); Louisville, Kentucky
- Education: University of Kentucky (B.A. and M.A., Anthropology); University of Michigan (Ph.D., Anthropology)
- Occupations: anthropologist, antiques appraiser, TV personality
- Known for: History Detectives
- Spouse: Shelley Cowan (1978 - )
- Children: 2
- Website: cowanauctions.com

C. Wesley Cowan (born September 4, 1951, in Louisville, Kentucky) is an American anthropologist, auctioneer, and appraiser of antiques. He is an owner of Cowan's Auctions, Inc. in Cincinnati, Ohio.

== Education and career ==
Cowan is a licensed auctioneer in Ohio and received a B.A. and M.A. in Anthropology from the University of Kentucky, and a Ph.D. in Anthropology from the University of Michigan.

After receiving his Ph.D., he taught at the Anthropology Department of Ohio State University.

In 1984, Cowan moved to Cincinnati, Ohio to be the Curator of Archaeology at the Cincinnati Museum of Natural History & Science. He has published in the fields of American archaeology and paleoethnobotany.

In 1995, he left academia and founded his antiques business, Cowan's Auctions, Inc. in Cincinnati, Ohio.

Cowan has been a regular in the PBS series Antiques Roadshow and History Detectives.

== Selected publications ==
=== Books ===
- Cowan, C. Wesley; Watson, Patty Jo, (editors), The Origins of Agriculture in International Perspective, Tuscaloosa, Alabama : The University of Alabama Press, January 28, 2006 (originally published in 1992 by The Smithsonian Institution Press, Washington D.C. ISBN 0874749905)
- Brose, David S.; Cowan, C. Wesley; Mainfort, Robert C., (editors), Societies in Eclipse: Eastern North America at the Dawn of European Colonization, Washington, S.C. : Smithsonian Institution Press, 2001.
- Brose, David S.; Cowan, C. Wesley; Mainfort, Robert C., (editors), Societies in Eclipse: Archaeology of the Eastern Woodlands Indians, A.D. 1400-1700, Tuscaloosa, Alabama : The University of Alabama Press, 2010
- Cowan, C. Wesley, First farmers of the middle Ohio Valley : Fort Ancient societies, A.D. 1000-1670, Cincinnati, Ohio : Cincinnati Museum of Natural History, 1987
