= Gwendolyn Wright =

American architectural historian

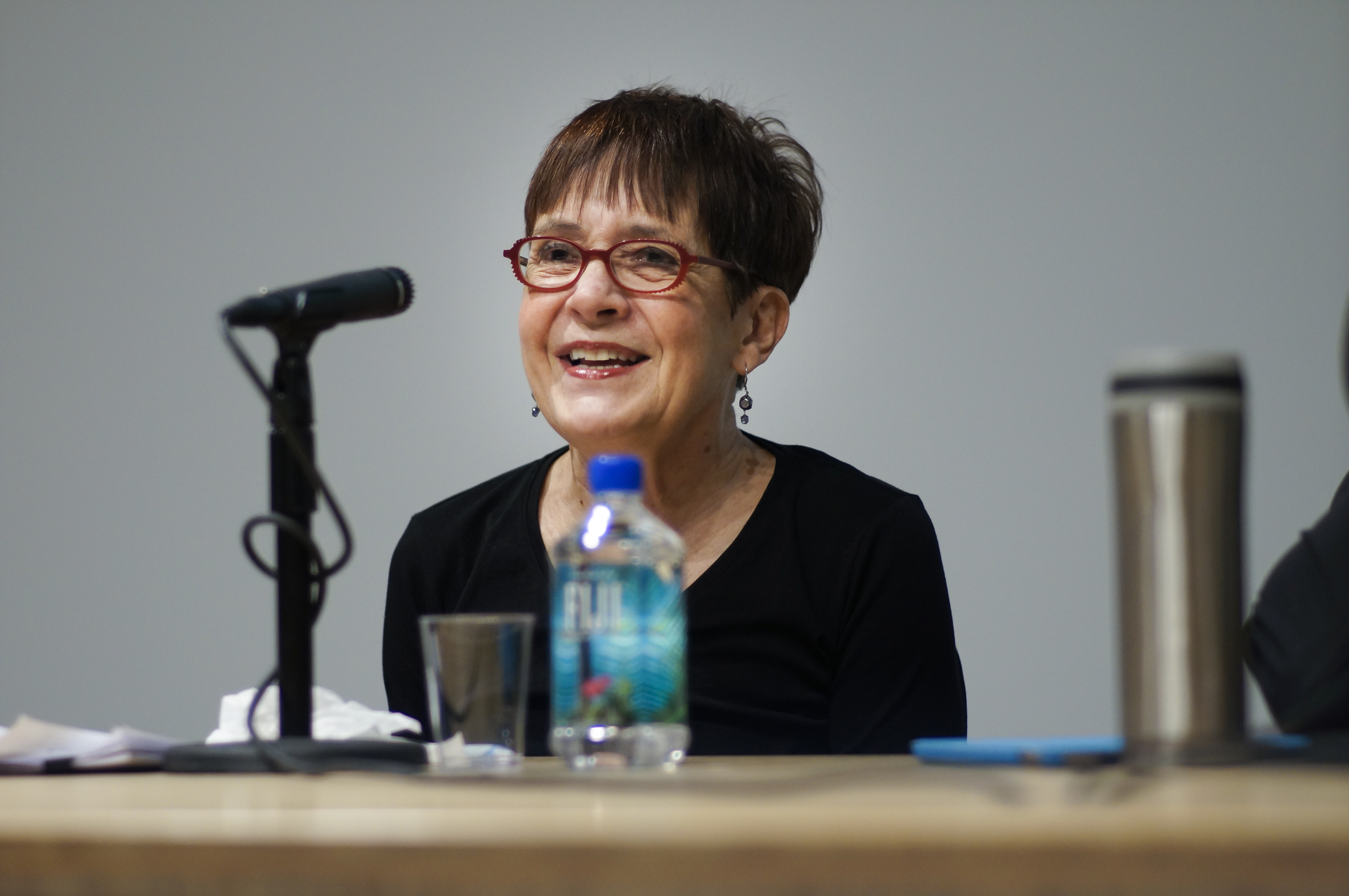
- Wright in 2014
- Education: University of California, Berkeley, MArch and PhD; New York University, BA
- Awards: Fellowship in the Humanities from the Ford Foundation, 1979-80 Nina Sutton Weeks Fellowship from the Stanford Humanities Center, 1982-83; Elected a fellow in the Society of American Historians in 1985; Fellowship from the University of Michigan Institute for the Humanities, 1991; Getty Fellowship from the Getty Center for the History of Art and the Humanities, 1992-93; Guggenheim Fellowship, 2004-5; Beverly Willis Architecture Foundation Fellowship, 2005-6 Graham Foundation Fellowship, 2006
- Scientific career
- Fields: Architectural History; Urban History; Art History
- Workplaces: Columbia University

Gwendolyn Wright is an architectural historian and author. She was one of the hosts of the PBS television series History Detectives. She is a professor of architecture at Columbia University, also holding appointments in both its departments of history and art history. Dr. Wright's specialties are US architectural history and urban history from after the Civil War to the present. She also writes about the exchange across national boundaries of architectural styles, influences, and techniques, particularly examining the colonial and neo-colonial attributes of both modernism and historic preservation.

== Biography ==
Gwendolyn Wright attended New York University, and in 1969 received a BA in history and art history. She did her graduate work at the University of California, Berkeley, and was awarded her M.Arch in 1974 and her PhD in Architecture in 1978. She published her first book in 1980.

Wright was hired by Columbia University in 1983, two years later becoming the first female to gain tenure in its prestigious Graduate School of Architecture, Planning and Preservation. She succeeded founder Robert A. M. Stern as director of the Buell Center for the Study of American Architecture, serving in that capacity from 1988 to 1992.

In 2002, Wright was hired by television producers to be part of what would ultimately become the new TV series "History Detectives". Back then the working title for the show was “American Attic”, and the initial concept was to tell stories of history through a focus on houses, hence their interest in adding an experienced architectural historian like Wright. The concept evolved into solving historical puzzles that use a wide variety of tangible objects to show how historians piece together various kinds of knowledge—and conflicting evidence and diverse perspectives—about what happened, how and why.

She has authored four books, edited two others, and written numerous articles, reviews, and essays.

Wright has been recognized for her achievements on numerous occasions, including a John Simon Guggenheim Memorial Foundation Fellowship, 2004–5, a Fellowship in the Humanities from the Ford Foundation, 1979–80; a Nina Sutton Weeks Fellowship from the Stanford Humanities Center, 1982–83; a Fellowship from the University of Michigan Institute for the Humanities, 1991; a Getty Fellowship from the Getty Center for the History of Art and the Humanities, 1992–93; a Beverly Willis Architecture Foundation Fellowship, 2005–6; and a Graham Foundation Fellowship, 2006. She was elected a fellow in the Society of American Historians in 1985, honoring literary quality in historical writing.

Wright has a daughter, Sophia Bender Koning, and a stepson, David Bender.

== Bibliography ==
Moralism and the Model Home: Domestic Architecture and Cultural Conflict in Chicago, 1873-1913. 1980 (1985 paperback) University of Chicago Press. ISBN 978-0-226-90835-9

- Chicago residential architectural history in the context of competing economic and cultural forces during the pivotal years 1873-1913.

Building the Dream: A Social History of Housing in America. 1981 (1983 paperback). New York: Pantheon (MIT Press paperback). ISBN 978-0-394-50371-4 (9780262730648 paperback)

- US residential architectural history in the context of other developments since the late 1600s.

The History of History in American Schools of Architecture, 1865-1975. (edited with Janet Parks) 1990 (1996 paperback). New York: Princeton Architectural Press. ISBN 978-1-878271-02-0

- Examination of the role of and changes in the teaching of history within US schools of architecture, including the relationship of architectural history to architectural theory and learning.

The Politics of Design in French Colonial Urbanism. 1991. University Of Chicago Press. ISBN 978-0-226-90848-9

- Morocco, Indochina, and Madagascar architectural history during the French colonial administration.

The Formation of National Collections of Art and Archaeology. 1995. CASVA/National Gallery of Art. ISBN 978-0-300-07718-6

- Examination of the architecture and contents of museums and their role in depicting and shaping national identities and aspirations.

USA: Modern Architectures in History. 2008. Reaktion Press/University of Chicago. ISBN 978-1-86189-344-4

- US architectural history survey emphasizing Modernism as a response to changing economic and cultural conditions since 1865.
