= René Depestre =

Haitian-French poet (born 1926)

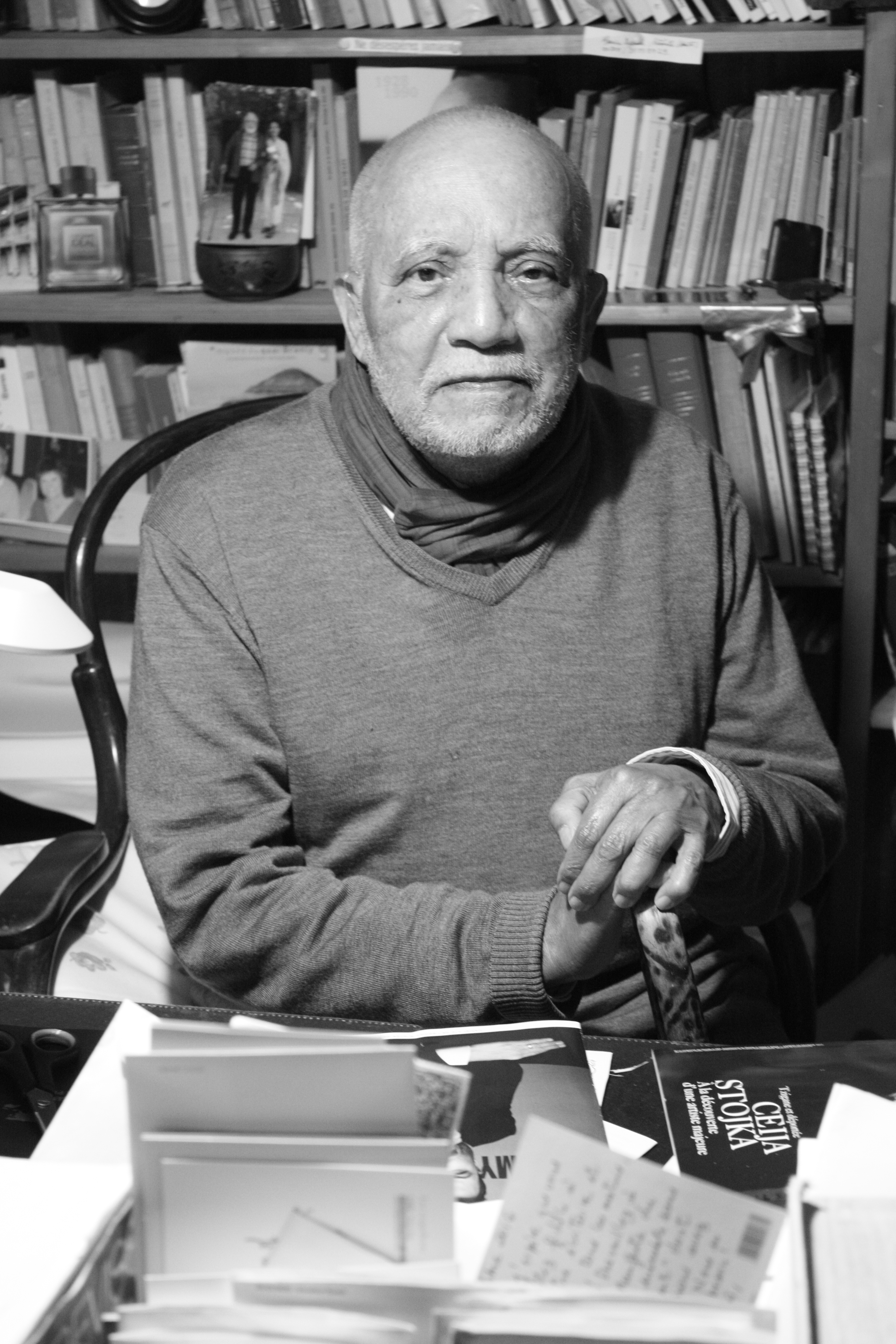
- René Depestre en 2017.
- Born: 29 August 1926
- Occupations: Poet, writer, essayist
- Notable work: Hadriana in All My Dreams
- Awards: Prix Goncourt de la nouvelle (1982); Prix Renaudot (Hadriana in All My Dreams, 1988); Tchicaya U Tam'si Prize for African Poetry (1991); Prix Guillaume Apollinaire (1993); Guggenheim Fellowship (1995); Grand Prix de Poésie (1998); Prix Carbet de la Caraïbe et du Tout-Monde (1998); Grand prix de littérature de la SGDL (2016); Amic Prize (1994); (2024); Prix Goncourt de la Poésie (2026); (1988)

René Depestre (born 29 August 1924 or 1926, (Note: Depestre claimed that he was born in 1924. However, biographies of him usually give the birthdate of 1926.) Jacmel, Haiti) is a Haitian-French poet and former communist activist. He is considered to be one of the most prominent figures in Haitian literature. He lived in Cuba as an exile from the Duvalier regime for many years and was a founder of the Casa de las Américas publishing house. He is best known for his poetry.

== Life ==
Depestre did his primary studies with the Breton Brothers of Christian Instruction. His father died in 1936, and René Depestre left his mother, his two brothers and his two sisters to go live with his maternal grandmother. From 1940 to 1944, he completed his secondary studies at the Pétion college in Port-au-Prince. His birthplace is often evoked in his poetry and his novels, in particular Hadriana in All My Dreams (1988).

Étincelles (Sparks), his first collection of poetry, appeared in 1945, prefaced by Edris Saint-Amand. He was only nineteen years old when the work was published. The poems were influenced by the marvelous realism of Alejo Carpentier, who planned a conference on this subject in Haiti in 1942. Depestre created a weekly magazine with three friends: Baker, Alexis, and Gérald Bloncourt: The Hive (1945–46). "One wanted to help the Haitians to become aware of their capacity to renew the historical foundations of their identity" (quote from Le métier à métisser). The Haitian government at the time seized the 1945 edition, published in honor of André Breton, which led to the insurrection of 1946. Depestre met with all his Haitian intellectual contemporaries, including Jean Price-Mars, Léon Laleau, and René Bélance, who wrote the preface to his second collection, Gerbe de sang, in 1946. He also met with foreign intellectuals. He took part in and directed the revolutionary student movements of January 1946, which led to the overthrow of President Élie Lescot. The Army very quickly seized power, and Depestre was arrested and imprisoned before being exiled. He pursued his studies in letters and political science at the Sorbonne from 1946 to 1950. In Paris, he met French surrealist poets as well as foreign artists, and intellectuals of the négritude (Black) movement who coalesced around Alioune Diop and Présence Africaine.

Depestre took an active part in the decolonization movements in France, and he was expelled from French territory alongside his first wife, Edith Sorel, a Jewish woman of Hungarian origin. He left for Prague, from where he was driven out in 1952. He went to Cuba, invited by the writer Nicolás Guillén, where again he was stopped and expelled by the government of Fulgencio Batista. He was denied entry by France and Italy. He left for Austria, then Chile, Argentina and Brazil. He remained in Chile long enough to organize, with Pablo Neruda and Jorge Amado, the Continental Congress of Culture.

After Brazil, Depestre returned to Paris in 1956 where he met other Haitians, including Jacques Stephen Alexis. He took part in the first Pan-African congress organized by Présence Africaine in September 1956. He wrote in Présence Africaine and other journals of the time such as Esprit, and Lettres Francaises. He returned to Haiti in (1956–57). Refusing to collaborate with the Duvalierist regime, he called on Haitians to resist, and was placed under house arrest. Depestre left for Cuba in 1959, at the invitation of Che Guevara. Convinced of the aims of the Cuban Revolution, he helped with managing the country (Ministry for Foreign Relations, National Publishing, National Council of Culture, Radio Havana Cuba, Las Casas de las Américas, The Committee for the Preparation of the Cultural Congress of Havana in 1967). Depestre travelled, taking part in official activities (the USSR, China, Vietnam, etc.) and took part in the first Pan-African Cultural Festival (Algiers, 1969), where he met the Congolese writer Henri Lopes, with whom he would work later, at UNESCO.

During his various travels and his stay in Cuba, Rene Depestre continued working on a major piece of poetry. One of his most famous collections of poetry is Un arc-en-ciel pour l'Occident chrétien (Rainbow for the Christian Occident) (1967), a mix of politics, eroticism, and Voudoo, topics that are found in all of his works. Poet in Cuba (1973) is a reflection on the evolution of the Cuban Revolution.

Pushed aside by the Castrist régime in 1971, Depestre broke with the Cuban experiment in 1978 and went back to Paris where he worked at the UNESCO Secretariat. In 1979, in Paris, he published Le Mat de Cocagne, his first novel. In 1980, he published Alléluia pour une femme-jardin, for which he was awarded the Prix Goncourt de la nouvelle in 1982.

Depestre left UNESCO in 1986 and retired in the Aude region of France. In 1988, he published Hadriana in All My Dreams, which received many literary awards, including the Prix Théophraste Renaudot, the Prix de la Société des Gens de Lettres, the Prix Antigone of the town of Montpellier, and the Belgian Prix du Roman de l'Académie royale de la langue et de la littérature françaises. He obtained French citizenship in 1991. He continued to receive awards and honors, in particular the Prix Guillaume Apollinaire for his Anthologie personnelle (1993) and the Italian Grisane Award for the theatrical adaptation of Mat de Cocagne in 1995, as well as bursaries (Bourse du Centre National du Livre, in 1994, and a Guggenheim Fellowship in 1995). He was the subject of a documentary film by Jean-Daniel Lafond, Haiti in All Our Dreams, filmed in Montreal (1996).

Depestre also published major essays. Bonjour et adieu à la négritude (Hello and Good-bye to Négritude) presents a reflexion on his ambivalent position regarding the négritude movement started by Léopold Sédar Senghor, Aimé Césaire and Leon-Gontran Damas. Impressed by Aime Césaire, who came to Haiti to speak about surrealism and négritude, he was fascinated by créole life, or the créolo-francophonie, which did not stop him from questioning the concept of négritude. Rebellious of the concept since his youth, which he associated with ethnic essentialism, he measured the historical range and situated the movement in the world history of ideas. He revisited this topic (critical re-situation of the movement) in his two collections, Ainsi parle le fleuve noir (1998) and Le Métier à métisser (1998). He paid homage to Césaire and his visionary work within the context of the créole movement in Martinique: "Césaire with only one word ended this empty debate: at the start of historical decolonization, In Haiti and around the world, there is the genius of Toussaint Louverture" (Le Métier à métisser 25). His experience in Cuba – his fascination and his falling out with the "castrofidelism" ideology and its constraints – is also examined in these two texts, as well as marvelous realism, the role of the erotic, Haitian history and the very contemporary topic of globalization.

Far from seeing himself as an exile, Depestre prefers being described as a nomad with multiple roots, a “banyan” man – in reference to the tree which he so often evokes right down to its rhizomic roots – even described as a "géo-libertin". As of 1986, Depestre lives in a small village in the Aude, Lézignan-Corbières, with his second wife, Nelly Campano, who is Cuban.

His work has been published in the United States, the former Soviet Union, France, Germany, Italy, Cuba, Peru, Brazil, Vietnam, the former German Democratic Republic (East-Germany), Argentina, Denmark and Mexico. His first volume of poetry, Sparks (Etincelles) was published in Port-au-Prince in 1945. Other publications include Gerbe de sang (Port-au-Prince, 1946), Végétation de clartés, preface by Aimé Césaire, (Paris, 1951), Traduit du grand large, poème de ma patrie enchainée, (Paris, 1952), Minerai noir, (Paris, 1957), Journal d'un animal marin (Paris, 1964), Un arc-en-ciel pour l'occident chrétien poeme mystère vaudou, (Paris, 1966). His poetry has appeared in many French, Spanish and German anthologies and collections. More current works include Anthologie personnelle (1993) and Actes sud, for which he received the Prix Apollinaire. He has spent many years in France, and was awarded the French literary prize, the prix Renaudot, in 1988 for his work Hadriana dans Tous mes Rêves.

He is a special envoy of UNESCO for Haiti. He is the uncle of Michaëlle Jean, the Governor General of Canada from 2005 to 2010.

== Selected works ==
Poetry

- Etincelles, Port-au-Princ: Imprimerie de l'Etat, 1945
- Gerbes de Sang, Port-au-Prince: Imprimerie de l'Etat, 1946
- Végétations de Clarté, Paris: Seghers, 1951
- Traduit du Grand Large, poème de ma patrie enchainée, Paris: Seghers, 1952
- Minerai noir, Paris: Présence Africaine, 1956
- Un arc-en-ciel pour l'occident chrétien, poème mystère vaudou, 1966
- Journal d'un animal marin, Paris: Présence Africaine, 1967
- Cantate d'Octobre à la Vie et à la Mort du Commandant Ernesto Che Guevara, Havana: Institudo del Libro, 1968
- Poète à Cuba, Paris: Pierre Jean Oswald, 1976
- En etat de poésie, Paris: Les Editeurs français réunis, 1980
- Lettre à un poète du marronnage, Bois Pluriel, 1988
- Au Matin de la négritude, Paris: Euroeditor, 1990
- Anthologie personelle, Arles: Actes Sud, 1993
- "Ode à Malcolm X: Grande Brigitte", in Literature Moderne du Monde Francophone, by Peter Thompson. Chicago: National Textbook Company (McGraw-Hill), 1997, ISBN 978-0-8442-1588-4
- Un Eté indien de la parole, Double Cloche, 2001
- Non-assistance à poète en danger, Paris: Seghers, 2005
- Rage de vivre. Oeuvres poétiques complètes, Paris: Seghers, 2007

Novels and short stories

- El Paso Ensebado (in Spanish), 1975
- Le Mât de cocagne, Paris: Gallimard, 1979
- Alléluia pour une femme jardin, Paris: Gallimard, 1981
- Hadriana dans Tous mes Rêves, Paris: Gallimard, 1988 – Prix Renaudot
- Eros dans un train chinois, Paris: Gallimard, 1990
- "La mort coupée sur mesure", in Noir des îles, Paris: Gallimard, 1995
- "Un rêve japonais", in Le Serpent à plumes. Récits et fictions courtes, Paris: Le Serpent à plumes, 1993
- L'oeillet ensorcelé, Paris: Gallimard, 2006

Essays

- Pour la révolution pour la poésie, Paris: Leméac, 1974
- Bonjour et Adieu à la Négritude, Paris: Robert Laffont, 1980
- Le Métier à métisser, Paris: Stock, 1998
- Ainsi parle le fleuve noir, Paroles de l'Aube, 1998

== Sources ==
- Chaulet Achour, Christiane (2010). "Depestre, René". Dictionnaire des écrivains francophones classiques [Dictionary of classic French-speaking writers] (in French). Éditions Honoré Champion. pp. 127–131. doi:10.14375/NP.9782745336118. ISBN 978-2-7453-2126-8.
- Schutt-Ainé, Patricia (1994). Haiti: A Basic Reference Book. Miami, Florida: Librairie Au Service de la Culture. p. 102. ISBN 0-9638599-0-0.
- Thompson, Peter S.; René Depestre (1997). Littérature moderne du monde francophone: Une anthologie. Lincolnwood (Chicago), Illinois: National Textbook Company. p. 105. ISBN 0-8442-1588-0. (In French)
- https://ile-en-ile.org/depestre/ (Original in French)
