= Stephen Alexis =

Haitian novelist & diplomat (1889–1962)

Stephen Mesmin Alexis (1889–1962) was a Haitian novelist and diplomat. Born in Gonaïves, Alexis served as Haiti's ambassador to the United Kingdom and represented Haiti at the United Nations.

He is best known for his novel Le Négre Masqué (1933). He is also credited with writing the most complete account of Toussaint Louverture's life. The Black Liberator: The Life of Toussaint Louverture, was translated from French by William Sterling and published in England in 1949. The French version of the book was never published; it apparently disappeared while on its way to the publisher. Alexis managed to rewrite the manuscript while in exile; however, it was also stolen just before he died in exile on August 15, 1962, in Caracas.

His son, Jacques Stephen Alexis, also became a noted novelist. His grandson Jean-Jacques Stephen Alexis ("JanJak II") also a poet and Visual artist http://www.interfineart.com, lives in Miami, where he oversees the Fondation Jacques Stephen Alexis.
