= Woolfolk family murders =

Mass murder of nine people in Georgia, USA (1887)

Woolfolk Murders
- Location: Bibb County, Georgia, U.S.
- Date: August 6, 1887
- Attack type: Mass murder, familicide
- Victims: Richard F. Woolfolk, Sr., 54; Mattie H. Woolfolk, 41; Richard F. Woolfolk, Jr., 20; Pearl Woolfolk, 17; Annie Woolfolk, 10; Rosebud Woolfolk, 7 Charlie Woolfolk, 5 Mattie Woolfolk, eighteen months Temperance West, 84
- Perpetrator: Thomas G. Woolfolk
- Motive: Inheritance of Richard Woolfolk Sr.'s property
- Verdict: Guilty
- Convictions: Felony first-degree murder
- Sentence: Death
- Convicted: 1

The Woolfolk family murders took place on August 6, 1887, in Bibb County, Georgia, twelve miles from the county seat Macon, Georgia, when nine members of the Woolfolk (/wʊlˈfɔːrk/ WUUL-fork) family were murdered with a wood-handled axe. Authorities identified the murderer as Thomas George "Tom" Woolfolk, the son and stepson of two victims, grandnephew of one, and stepbrother of six.

After three highly publicized trials, one of which ended in a jury verdict overturned on appeal and another of which ended in a mistrial, Woolfolk was formally convicted of one of the murders, that of his father, Richard F. Woolfolk Sr., and sentenced to death. Woolfolk was executed by hanging on October 29, 1890. Tom Woolfolk protested his innocence from his arrest to the end of his life, and since Tom Woolfolk's execution, some modern historians have cast doubt on Woolfolk's guilt and proposed alternate suspects, while others believe he was responsible and correctly prosecuted for the mass murder.

The New Georgia Encyclopedia called the Woolfolk family murders "the most infamous crime in nineteenth-century Georgia". For over 100 years until Mark Orrin Barton's 1999 mass murder of thirteen people, the Woolfolk family's murders were the largest mass murder in Georgia's history.

The murders at the time were considered the largest mass murder in American history at the time.

== Background ==
Richard Woolfolk was the son of a wealthy businessman and slaveowner named Thomas W. Woolfolk; Susan Woolfolk was the daughter of a wealthy factory owner named Thomas Moore. Richard and Susan Woolfolk married in 1854. That same year, Richard graduated from the University of Georgia. Richard owned enslaved people as well, and he served in the American Civil War as a captain of a Confederate militia in Georgia. After the war, Richard returned to his home, an 867-acre property worth $25,000 USD ($512,340 USD when adjusted for 2024 inflation), and hired men he had formerly enslaved to live as tenants on his property and work as farmhands. By 1884, Richard Woolfolk was among Bibb County, Georgia's largest landowners.

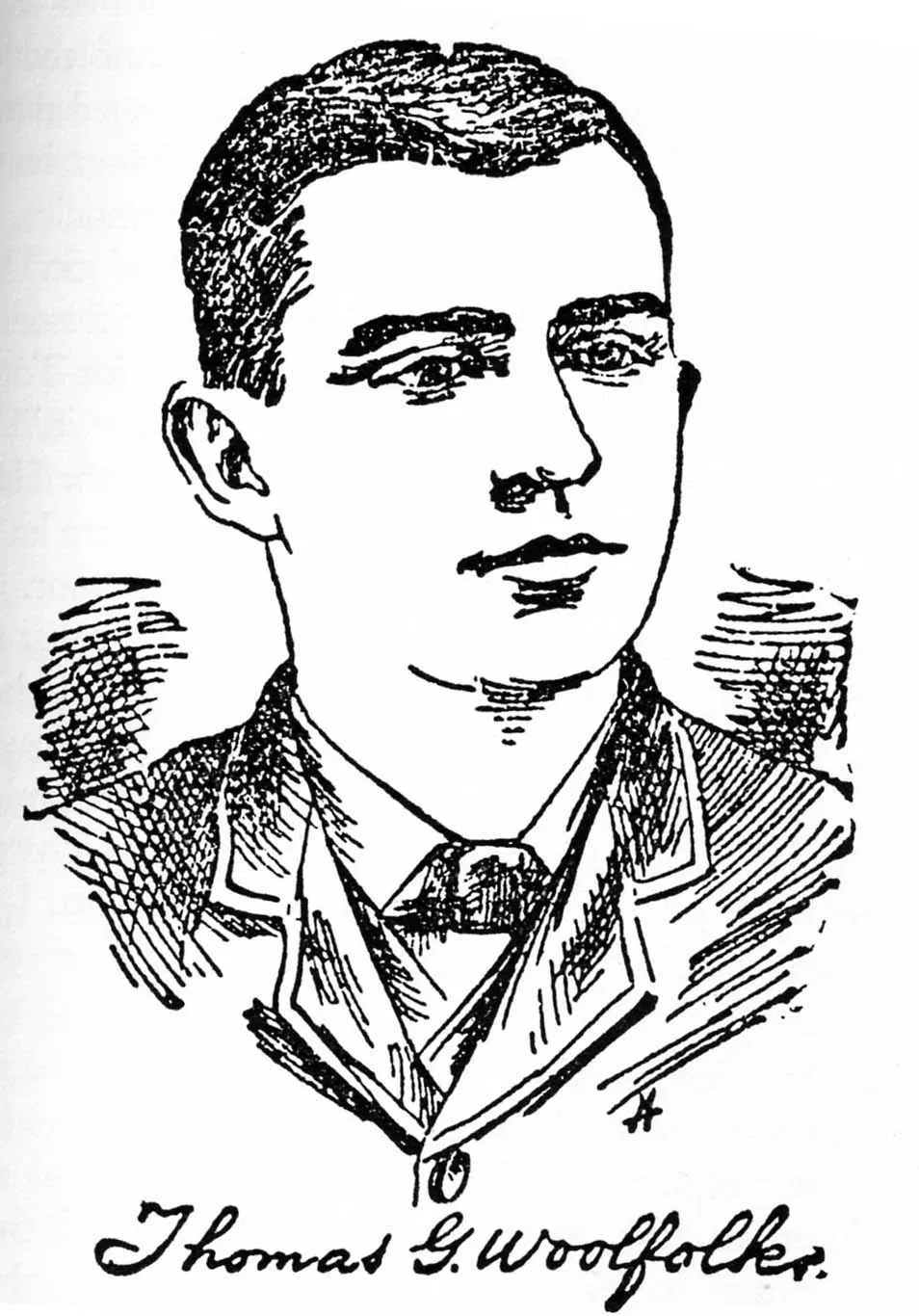
Sketch of Tom Woolfolk, adapted from a photograph taken while Woolfolk was housed in the Bibb County Jail in Macon

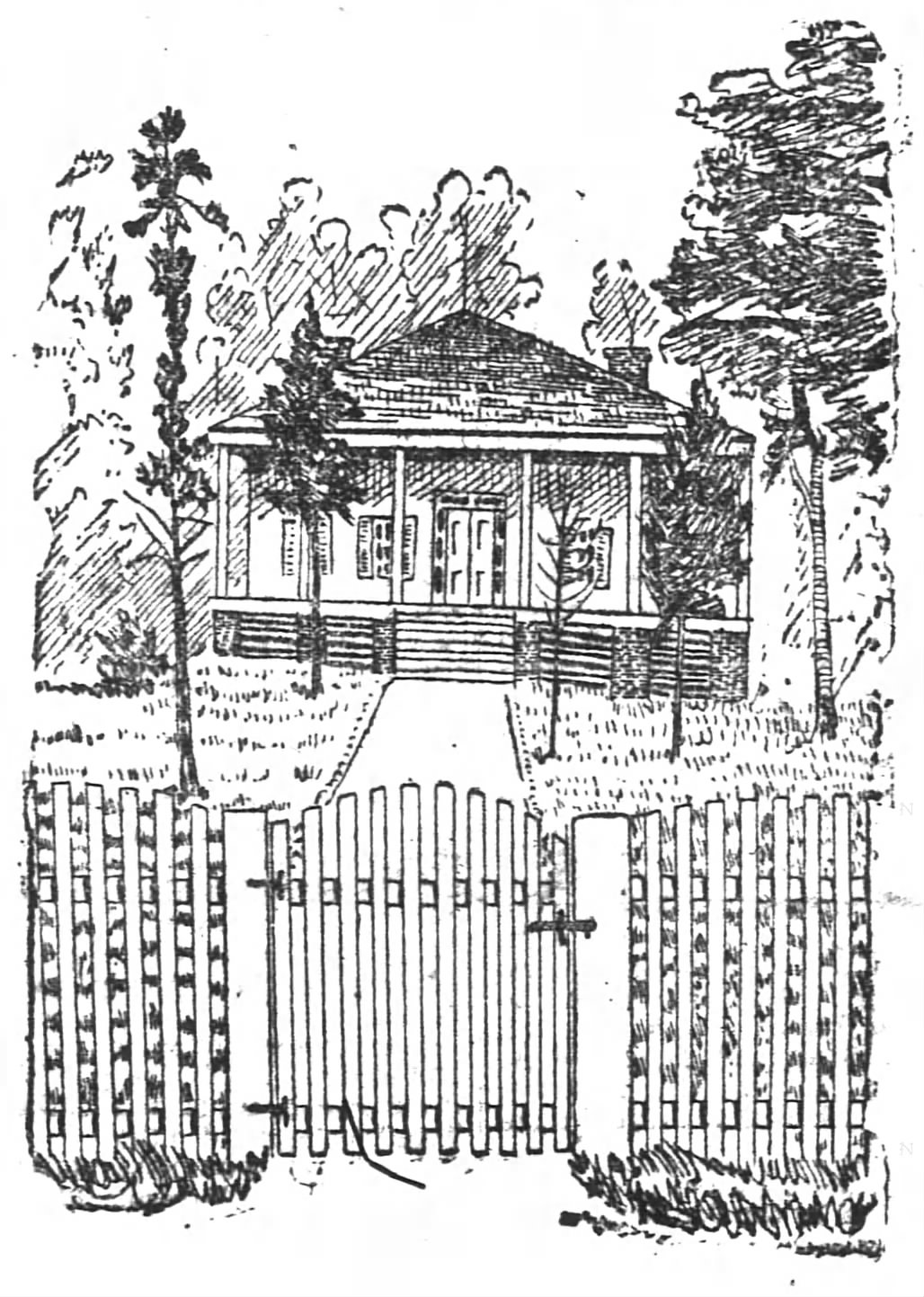
Sketch of the Woolfolk family home, where the murders of nine members of the Woolfolk family took place, published in 1887

=== Perpetrator ===
Thomas G. "Tom" Woolfolk was born to Richard and Susan Woolfolk in his father's Bibb County farmhouse on June 18, 1860. He was their third child and only son. A few years after his birth, his birth mother Susan died, after which Tom's father sent him and his sisters to live in Athens, Georgia, with one of Susan's sisters. In 1867, his father remarried to a woman named Mattie (née Howard), and Tom moved to live with Richard and Mattie Woolfolk in a new large, single-story, four-room farmhouse. Richard and Mattie Woolfolk proceeded to have six additional children together.

As a young adult, Tom left home and leased a plantation. After no more than two years, the plantation proved to be a financial failure. Tom next opened a grocery and liquor store in Macon, which also failed. He then moved to Texas with aspirations of buying and selling horses, but he returned to Bibb County after a few months and became a streetcar driver for a few days before being fired. Afterwards, he made a second attempt to open a grocery store, which also folded by February 1887 due to Tom's inability to afford rent.

In the summer of 1887, Tom Woolfolk married Georgia Bird. Bird left him and returned to her mother's home after three weeks of marriage, although she later stated she wanted to leave him after only one day of marriage; she later divorced him, the divorce being finalized in 1890. Locals described Tom Woolfolk as being belligerent in nature; while some locals posited that Tom was "noticeably mentally deranged," Bird stated in an interview with a local newspaper that she did not believe Tom to be "crazy," but instead thought "[it was] simple meanness. He is the meanest man I ever saw, and there is nothing too mean for him to do."

On August 9, 1887, Bird conducted an interview with an Atlanta Constitution reporter from Macon, wherein she accused Tom of lying that "he had a place ready for me and everything to make a wife comfortable," but that she discovered within three days of their marriage earlier that summer that Tom had no estate of his own and "did nothing". After this discovery, Bird said he became abusive towards her and insisted she and his parents would not get along. After she met his parents and had an amicable interaction with them, she said Tom began cursing and replied, "Wait until you see more of them. . . . The property shall not do them any good, I will burn them up first." Shortly after that conversation, Bird's mother arrived to help her leave Tom, as Bird "could not stand his evil ways." Bird also expressed in the interview that Tom's sister was reportedly "mistreated" by Tom as well and that Tom made Bird fear for her life. Bird's father forbade Tom from entering his house after Bird left him. After the failure of his marriage, Tom returned to his father's plantation and worked for a low wage of $9 USD, (equivalent to $322 in 2025), per month.

Tom's aunt, with whom he lived before his father's marriage to Mattie, and whom he visited shortly before the murders of his family members, recalled that as an adult, he had developed a habit of pacing the floor all night without sleeping, rambling incoherently and disjointedly, and exhibiting signs of paranoia; both she and one of Tom's older sisters believed Tom was "losing his mind," but his father disagreed.

Tom reportedly resented his stepmother and saw her six children with Richard as being potential impediments to him inheriting his father's property and assets. People who knew Tom said he had an obsession with money and developed resentment towards his father as well for what he perceived to be his father's withholding of money from him in favor of his six younger children. Locals reported that Tom would publicly speak of his hatred towards his stepmother and his half-brothers and half-sisters, particularly his half-brothers due to the boys being more likely to inherit Richard's property than the girls. The same locals said they had heard Tom make violent and threatening remarks about Mattie Woolfolk and his half-siblings, and they speculated that Tom moved back in with his father and worked for low wages so he could scope the property out and eventually earn it himself. Modern historian Chrissy Lutz speculated that Tom felt further resentment towards the fact that he had to work alongside his father's formerly enslaved farmhands: "Richard Woolfolk had reduced his son's status to that of an ordinary black laborer and was denying him the proceeds of the family plantation". Tom was also known to be an alcoholic. Days before her murder, Mattie Woolfolk told her father she was afraid of her stepson Tom.

== Murders ==
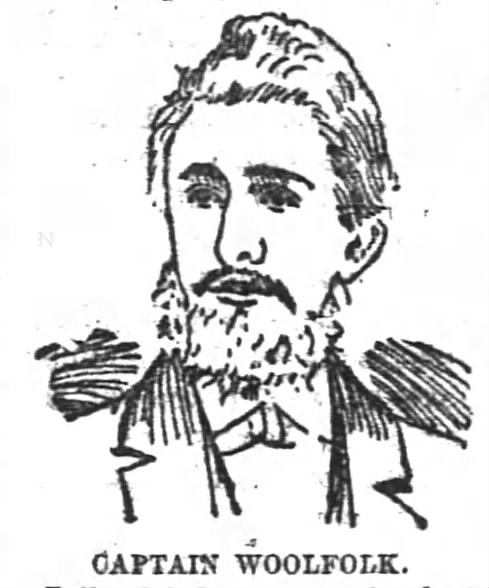
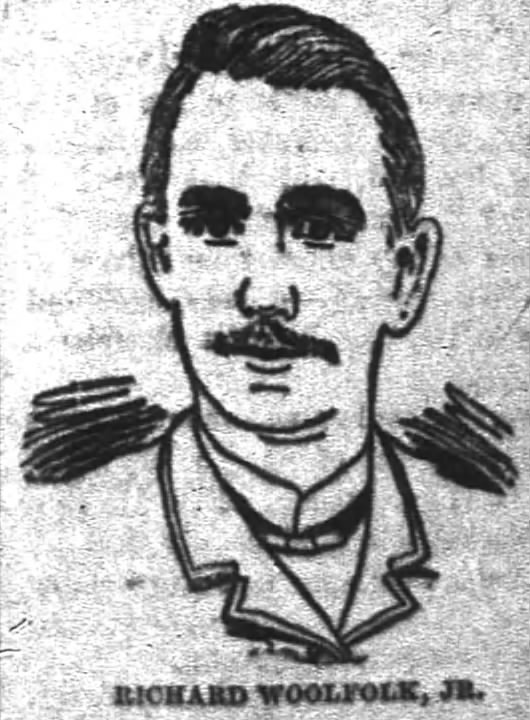
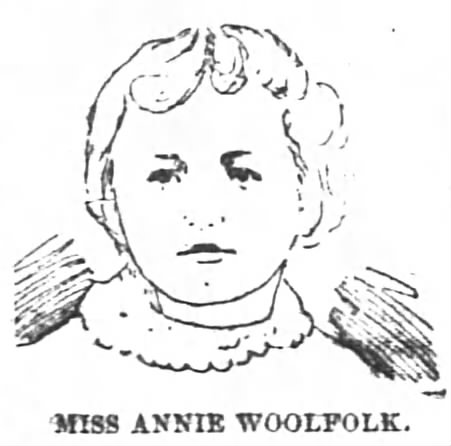
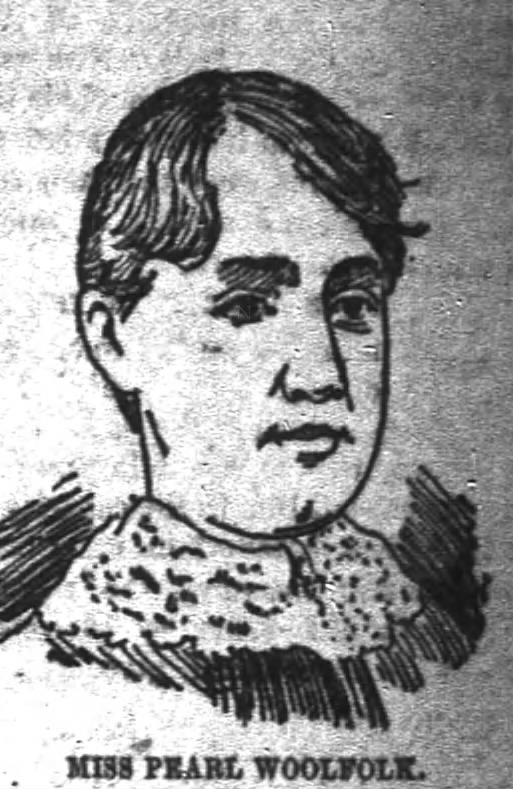
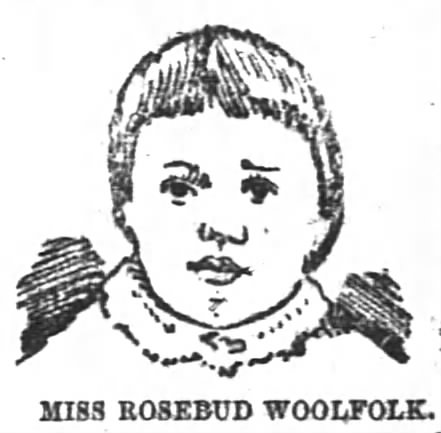
Sketches of five of the nine murder victims: Richard Sr., Richard Jr., Annie, Pearl, and Rosebud Woolfolk

On August 6, 1887, between 2:00 and 4:00 am, Tom Woolfolk used an axe to murder his parents (Richard Sr. and stepmother Mattie Woolfolk), his six half-siblings (Richard Jr., Pearl, Annie, Rosebud, Charlie, and infant Mattie Woolfolk), and Temperance West, his stepmother's 84-year-old aunt.

With the exception of Richard Jr. and Charlie, whose bodies were found on their parents' bedroom floor, and Annie, whose body was found in a kneeling position by an open window after evidently attempting to escape her killer, all the other victims' bodies were found in their beds. An article written the day after the murders said six victims (Richard Sr., his stepmother Mattie, infant Mattie, Pearl, Richard Jr., and Charlie) were found in one room, and Temperance West, Rosebud, and Annie were found in another room. Some victims had been struck once, while others sustained numerous axe injuries before they died; all victims were struck in the head and/or upper body. Many of the victims appeared to have been attacked while they were asleep, while others appeared to have awoken while other family members were attacked; for instance, Richard Sr. appeared to have been attacked first, in his sleep, while his wife Mattie appeared to have awoken after her husband's attack and attempted to escape.

=== Discovery and arrest ===
After the murders, Tom approached a black sharecropper and neighbor named Green Lockett, who knew the family and had worked for the family, and told Lockett a gang had broken into his house and murdered his entire family while leaving him as the sole survivor. Tom claimed he avoided being killed as well by leaving through a window, and that he returned to the house before summoning for help so he could confirm everyone in his family was dead; he claimed he heard the killers leave through a back door. Tom then asked Lockett and a second black sharecropper, Anderson James, to accompany him to the house to investigate the crime scene because Tom told them he could still hear commotion inside the house, but Lockett and James refused and instead summoned for help from several of the Woolfolk family's neighbors.

As Tom Woolfolk talked with neighbors and investigators, a crowd of several thousand townspeople and locals surrounded the house in curiosity. The local coroner immediately held an inquest, formed a twelve-member coroner's jury out of the crowd of townspeople, and examined the crime scene. The coroner's jury interviewed several locals and witnesses, including Lockett and James, both of whom testified to their knowledge of Tom's prior threatening statements towards his family members; three other black neighbors and three white neighbors offered similar testimony. The coroner and investigators noticed there was no evidence of a robbery or burglary, that nothing had been stolen from the house, and that Tom had blood on his ears and a bloody handprint on his leg; they also noted that Tom did not show much emotion save for apprehension and was not acting with the grief they expected of a mass murder survivor. During questioning, Tom admitted to removing his bloody clothes and discarding them down his family's well, which contaminated the well's water supply, and he also admitted to bathing himself before that. Witnesses came forward and identified the murder weapon, an axe, as belonging to Tom; some witnesses had seen Tom using the same axe to cut wood earlier on the day of the murder. During the coroner jury's inquest and deliberation, the Bibb County sheriff quietly moved Tom to the county jail to prevent extrajudicial lynch mob violence; at the conclusion of the inquest, the coroner's jury decided Tom was most likely responsible for the deaths of his family members.

On August 7, 1887, the sheriff ordered a search of the well and located Tom's discarded bloody shirt and a pair of Tom's underwear. That same day, the nine murder victims were buried in Macon's Rose Hill Cemetery. Later, amid the spreading news and amid rising tensions in the area, the sheriff moved Tom to an undisclosed location in Georgia's capital, Atlanta, for his protection.

In an interview conducted on August 11, 1887, by an Atlanta Constitution reporter misrepresenting himself as an attorney, Tom insisted he was innocent and that he believed he would be acquitted at trial, but that he still deserved to inherit his family's property and money after the murders. The reporter mentioned that Tom frequently seemed interested in discussing the property's likely value. In any case, early investigations of the murder scene suggested that Richard Woolfolk Sr., the owner of the property, died before his wife and children did, meaning inheritance laws that would have granted Tom the property through his father may not have been eligible to come into play and that the issue of inheritance might have been complicated. However, through inheritance, Tom did receive a portion of his father's property.

== Legal proceedings and trials ==
Tom Woolfolk was indicted on nine murder counts, but prosecutors chose to try him only for the murder of his father, a now-banned legal strategy intended to increase the chances of conviction by saving the other eight murder counts for a future prosecution attempt should the jury acquit him on the first attempt. Overall, Tom went through three trials, with his second trial following a decision by the Supreme Court of Georgia to overturn his conviction and grant him a new trial and his third trial following a mistrial due to a hung jury.

=== Initial investigations into Jack DeBose ===
In the lead-up to his first trial, Tom Woolfolk requested an attorney. The judge presiding over his case, James Nisbit, appointed Frank Walker, who was known to take "notorious" cases in the area; Walker offered his services pro bono. Walker planned to form an argument that Tom's implicative statements to the coroner's jury could not be used as evidence due to Walker's own theory that Tom had self-induced brain damage due to his excessive drinking. Walker also requested that Tom's aunt give interviews to the Atlanta Constitution wherein she would attest to believing he was insane. While Walker did investigative work on Tom's behalf, his sisters requested that another attorney, John Rutherford, act as the lead defense attorney during Tom's trial. Rutherford agreed, and Tom paid him by mortgaging his inherited share of his father's property to Rutherford. Walker continued his investigative work and questioned the black tenants who had worked on the Woolfolk property; after interviews with the tenants, Walker focused on one of them, Jack DeBose, (Note: Spelled "DeBose" in most sources, but alternately spelled "DuBose" in van Hartesveldt's Middle Georgia and the Approach of Modernity and a few select news articles.) as an alternate suspect, although the other tenants attested to their belief in Tom Woolfolk's guilt rather than DeBose. Walker stated in an interview with the Macon Telegraph that "I am satisfied in my own mind that [the other tenants] are wrong."

Nevertheless, DeBose was arrested and placed in a jail in Canton, Georgia, in September 1887. Newspapers stated that DeBose's confession implicated "other [black people]" as well and that his motive for murdering the Woolfolk family was revenge, as they had testified against DeBose in a theft case wherein he was accused of stealing an axe, leading to DeBose being convicted and subsequently placed on a chain gang. Newspapers also stated their belief that DeBose's confession to the murder was supposedly suspiciously thorough to the point of suggesting DeBose knew details of the crime that newspapers had not printed, and that his confession would exonerate Tom and lead to Tom's imminent release. However, after additional interrogations in jail, authorities suspected DeBose was a serial confessor who admitted to numerous crimes he had never committed, including three thefts, an arson, a burglary, and escape from prison. Finally, Atlanta's police chief interrogated DeBose about his involvement in stealing a white man's chickens, and DeBose confessed to the crime despite the police chief having invented the entire story and false accusation; after DeBose's confession to this nonexistent crime, authorities released DeBose and no longer considered him a suspect. Walker continued accusing DeBose of the murder after DeBose's release, leading to his re-arrest and return to jail, this time being imprisoned in Macon. Newspaper reporters interviewed DeBose several times during his second imprisonment. DeBose offered several stories to different reporters regarding the murders, including that Tom Woolfolk, Green Lockett, and Lockett's wife killed the Woolfolk family by blowing them up with dynamite; that DeBose knew nothing about the murder and was 150 years old; that DeBose stood in the Woolfolks' front yard and witnessed other black people committing the murder; and that he would harm the judge if he was further accused of murder. Walker had considered placing DeBose on the stand to help Tom's defense case by allowing the jury to consider an alternate suspect, but Rutherford refused to allow DeBose to testify. DeBose remained in jail until after the conclusion of Tom's third trial in 1889, after which DeBose was separately placed on trial for the Woolfolk family murders, although neither a prosecutor nor a defense attorney showed up in his case, which was sent to a lower court that officially determined DeBose was insane.

=== First trial ===
Tom Woolfolk's first trial began in the Superior Court of Bibb County on December 5, 1887. Tom's first trial was presided over by Judge Gustin, with J.L. Hardeman serving as the prosecutor and John Rutherford serving as Tom's lead defense attorney. Rutherford was later complimented for providing Tom with an effective defense, which one historian called "the most brilliant defense ever heard in Georgia". One of the pillars of Rutherford's defense on behalf of Tom was the improbability that a murder of such scale could have been committed by one individual, with Rutherford remarking in his closing statement, "Gentlemen, I tell you two or more persons entered Captain Woolfolk's room that night". During his first trial, Tom also made an unofficial, unsworn statement to the jury protesting his innocence. His jury deliberated for twelve minutes before convicting him of his father's murder on December 15, and issuing a death sentence the same day. The threatening remarks Tom made towards and regarding his stepmother and step-siblings reportedly played a significant part in the jury finding Tom guilty of their murders.

=== Appeals and retrials ===
Tom appealed his first conviction and death sentence. On February 11, 1889, the Supreme Court of Georgia voted in favor of Tom's appeal, ordering a new trial for him based on the trial's inclusion of inadmissible testimony that they determined affected the outcome of Tom's case. The appeal also critiqued the fact that court officials did nothing about spectators chanting, "Hang him! Hang him!" at Tom during closing arguments.

For his second trial, Tom and his attorneys requested a change of venue, leading his second trial to take place in Perry, Georgia, the seat of Houston County. His second trial, which began in March 1889, ended in a mistrial. Tom's third trial, which also took place in Perry, began on June 3, 1889, and lasted for approximately three weeks. This time, District Attorney Hardeman was assisted by Solicitor General William H. Felton Jr. As he had in the first trial, Tom informally protested his innocence before the jury. Also by the time of Tom's second trial, several people, including Tom's surviving sisters, his Athens-based aunt who helped raised him, and others who doubted that one individual was capable of committing nine murders with an axe, started to question Tom's guilt. Reportedly, Mercer University President and University of Georgia chancellor Henry H. Tucker believed there was not enough evidence presented at Tom's first trial to justify his conviction and that his first trial had not been fair. On June 24, 1889, after a 45-minute deliberation, the jury returned another conviction for first-degree murder of Richard Woolfolk Sr.; the next morning, the jury sentenced Tom to death.

On July 28, 1890, the Supreme Court of Georgia upheld Tom's second conviction and sentence. On October 7, 1890, a judge by the name of Gober affirmed Tom's death sentence and scheduled Tom to be hanged on Wednesday, October 29, 1890.

=== Execution of Tom Woolfolk ===
Tom Woolfolk's execution was scheduled to take place in Perry, where his retrial took place. Houston County's execution site was a gallows constructed in a valley; the valley created a natural amphitheater that permitted a crowd of 10,000 people to watch Tom's execution.

Several times prior to his hanging, Tom insisted he did not believe he would be executed and that he would escape if it were possible, but that he was resigned to his fate and would prefer death over a sentence commutation and continued imprisonment. Unbeknownst to the general public, while awaiting execution, Tom made several escape attempts and attempted to bribe his jailers to help him escape as well. Specifically, the night before his execution, he offered $500 (equivalent of modern $17,917) and a written autobiography if the watchman monitoring him in his last hours would let him escape. When the watchman refused, Tom offered him $100 (modern $3,583) and an autobiography in exchange for a bottle of morphine, an offer the watchman also refused. Also shortly before the hanging, Tom remarked to the sheriff who was to carry out his execution, Sheriff Cooper, that he did not like the way the gallows looked and requested that the gallows be "whitewashed," a request which Sheriff Cooper obliged. Before his execution, Tom ate a last meal of ham and eggs, batter cakes, waffles, rice, grits, syrup, hot biscuits, and coffee.

Tom was hanged shortly after 1:30 PM on October 29, 1890. On the gallows, Tom gave a speech reiterating his innocence. The crowd gathered to witness his execution was reportedly disappointed that he did not confess guilt at the last moment. Tom's hanging was reportedly botched because the noose failed to break his neck; his pulse beat for at least 11 minutes after the trap door opened beneath him, and various news reports stated that it took him between 13 and 25 minutes to die.

== Aftermath ==
=== Woolfolk family ===
After the murders, the home remained unoccupied until approximately 1909, when it was used as the office of a car club. It may have sustained fire damage at one point. In 1964, Georgia historian E. Merton Coulter visited the site where the house once stood and reported that "only ruins" existed; by the 1990s, other Georgia historians stated that the house's remains may have been buried "beneath the waters of a man-made reservoir". However, in 1996, University of Georgia School of Law professor Donald Wilkes discovered the remains of the house, still standing and "recognizable", although they had deteriorated significantly under growths of trees and vegetation.

Until sometime shortly after March 2005, the Woolfolk family's graves remained unmarked. In July 2024, the burial sites of the nine Woolfolk victims were vandalized; some of the headstones were overturned, ripped from the ground, and scattered about, with some moved up to 30 to 40 feet away from the official burial site. Bibb County authorities stated that they believed the alleged vandals were attempting to reach the buried remains underneath the burial sites, and they released surveillance footage of a group of men who were known gravesite and memorial site vandals and were in the cemetery around the time the vandalism took place.

=== Perpetrator ===
Following Tom's execution, Coulter noted that Tom had become a folk figure throughout Georgia, with children and adults creating nursery rhymes surrounding his crimes, an extremely popular one including:

Woolfolk Woolfolk, see what you've done,
You've murdered your whole family and never fired a gun.

There was also an unsubstantiated rumor that Tom was never hanged, that the sheriff had conspired with members of Tom's family to help Tom escape before his execution, and that a man resembling Tom was sighted in Texas in the late 1890s.

Tom Woolfolk's gravesite in Hawkinsville, Georgia, has been vandalized several times but has also received thousands of visitors since his execution, particularly since writers and historians have published works casting doubt on his guilt; locals "reverently [watch] over" the gravesite to ensure it cannot be vandalized further. The descendants of the surviving Woolfolks reportedly came to believe Tom Woolfolk was innocent of murder.

=== Retrospective analysis ===
In 2013, Guy Heinze Jr. went on trial in Brunswick, Georgia, for the murder of eight family members. Prosecutors sought the death penalty against him. In their opening statement, Heinze's defense attorney stated that it was impractical Heinze could have been guilty of murdering his entire family because "it's never been done before. There's no record of a crime like this being committed." During testimony of a Georgia Bureau of Investigation medical examiner who responded to the Heinze crime scene, prosecutors used their rebuttal to bring up the Woolfolk family murders as proof it was possible for a single individual to murder up to nine people, comparing the Woolfolk family murders to Heinze's murders despite the different methods of murder and unique motives, as Heinze beat his victims with the barrel of a shotgun and came from an impoverished family that would therefore not have left him much to inherit.

Carolyn DeLoach published two books about the murders, the second, Shadow Chasers: The Woolfolk Tragedy Revisited (2000), being a revised edition of the first book, The Woolfolk Murders (1996). Both of DeLoach's books dispute the notion of Tom Woolfolk's guilt; DeLoach posits that the murders were committed instead by a young black handyman who worked for the Woolfolks named Simon Cooper, who allegedly killed four people in South Carolina in January 1897 – the Wilson family, consisting of S. Wesley Wilson, his wife, and his 76-year-old father Ben, as well as Preston Smith, the family's black servant – shortly before a mob of angered citizens lynched him. Cooper allegedly kept a diary in which he documented his crimes, and according to DeLoach, Cooper's alleged accomplices in the Wilson family's murders claimed Cooper had boasted of his responsibility in committing the axe murders of a separate family in Macon "ten years earlier" and having "[learned] the art of mass murder" then. According to DeLoach, one of Cooper's diary entries allegedly read, "Tom Woolfolk was mighty slick, but I fixed him. I would have killed him with the rest of his damn family, but he was not at home." Rumors of Simon Cooper writing a note posthumously absolving Tom Woolfolk of guilt in his family's murders had proliferated since at least 1898, eight years after the execution and one year after Cooper's murder, when a railroad worker named H.S. Young, whose family raised Cooper, claimed Cooper bequeathed him his diaries and memorandums in a will drafted before Cooper's lynching. Young claimed that the entry exonerating Tom was written after Tom's execution and read in actuality, "Tom was too slick for me that night, but I'm even with him at last".

Other researchers believe Tom Woolfolk was guilty and properly accused, prosecuted, convicted, and executed for the murders, such as Dr. Chrissy Lutz, who published an academic essay called "The Woolfolk Murders, 1887: Adjusting One Race Myth" to critique the conclusions of DeLoach and Coulter that Simon Cooper committed the murders instead, suggesting that the racial politics of the time made it unlikely that authorities would have disregarded Tom's attempted accusations against his father's black field hands, namely Jack DeBose, without evidence strongly suggesting Tom's guilt instead. Additionally, Lutz noted that Cooper would have been a teenager at the time of the Woolfolk family murders and doubted that Cooper's alleged confessional note ever existed, stating that an editor of Sumter, South Carolina's newspaper The Watchman and Southron had confirmed shortly after Cooper's 1897 lynching that the note never existed; per Lutz, "[e]ven if the note had been written by Cooper ... it needn't have been true. In notes that he genuinely did write, he made outrageous claims (possibly because he knew that he was about to be tortured and murdered)". E. Merton Coulter stated his belief that there were no other viable suspects in the murder despite Tom's defense attorneys attempting to find one: "The defense was never able to connect anyone else with the murder, although they attempted to involve Negroes in the neighborhood." Nevertheless, Coulter concluded that Tom was mentally "abnormal". The New Georgia Encyclopedia continues to acknowledge Woolfolk as the murderer of his family and states the evidence against him was "overwhelming". In a final editorial on his case after his execution titled "The Last of Woolfolk," the Atlanta Constitution came to the same conclusion that the evidence against Woolfolk was "overwhelming".

== See also ==
- List of rampage killers in the United States
- Axe murder
- List of mass stabbings by death toll
