= Eduardo Obregón Pagán =

American history professor (born 1960)

Eduardo Pagán
- Born: Eduardo Obregón Pagán; August 13, 1960 (age 66); Mesa, Arizona
- Education: Arizona State University (B.A., 1987); University of Arizona (M.A., 1989); Princeton University (M.A., 1991; Ph.D., 1996).
- Occupations: professor, historian, TV personality
- Known for: History Detectives

Eduardo Obregón Pagán (born August 13, 1960) is the Bob Stump Endowed Professor of History at Arizona State University, and one of the hosts of the PBS popular series History Detectives since 2008.

== Biography ==
A native of Mesa, Arizona, Eduardo Pagán received his BA from Arizona State University in 1987, an M.A. from the University of Arizona in 1989, another MA from Princeton University in 1991, and a Ph.D. from Princeton University in 1996. While at Princeton he was an exchange scholar at Yale University.

He was an acting assistant dean of students at Princeton University (1991–1992), a faculty member at Williams College (1995–2000), a program officer at the National Endowment for the Humanities (2000–2004), and department chair of Language, Cultures, and History at Arizona State University (2004–2008).

He has also appeared in the 2002 episode Zoot Suit Riots on PBS’s American Experience.

Pagán is a frequent guest lecturer on topics such as American West, Latinos in the United States, American youth subculture and American religion.

== Publications ==
=== Books ===
- Murder at the Sleepy Lagoon: Zoot Suits, Race, and Riot in Wartime L.A. (Chapel Hill: University of North Carolina Press, 2003)
- Historic Photos of Phoenix (Nashville: Turner Publishing, 2007), winner of Arizona Book Publisher’s Association 2008 Glyph Award
- Valley of the Guns: The Pleasant Valley War and the Trauma of Violence (The University of Oklahoma Press, 2018)
