= Elyse Luray =

American art historian and appraiser

- Born: Baltimore, Maryland, U.S.
- Education: Newcomb College (B.A., Art History, 1989)
- Occupations: art historian, antiques appraiser, TV personality
- Known for: History Detectives

Elyse Luray, born around 1967, is an American art historian and appraiser of historical objects who has become a television personality as a result of her appearances on a number of shows, most particularly as a member, since its premiere in 2003, of PBS's investigation-of-the-past series History Detectives.

== Early life and career ==
A native of Baltimore, Elyse Luray attended Newcomb College, the women's college of New Orleans' Tulane University, graduating in 1989 with a degree in art history. During a career of more than a decade as an expert appraiser and auctioneer for Christie's Auction House, she was also displaying her expertise on select episodes of PBS's popular object-appraisal show Antiques Roadshow and subsequently became one of PBS' History Detectives.

In addition to the PBS shows, she has also participated in "Cash in the Attic 2021" HGTV/TLC's historical-home program If Walls Could Talk as well as co-hosting Endless Yard Sale for many years. She also hostedTreasure Seekers, a cable/satellite program which follows her travels to antiques shows around the country in order to display and evaluate objects of historical significance and/or interest. She was also a regular contributor to the magazine Antique Trader and website Huffington Post. Luray appeared regularly on The Nate Berkus Show as his appraiser. She is also an appraiser on the Style Network's Clean House New York. In 2012, she began hosting Syfy's Collection Intervention, which premiered August 14, 2012.

Luray is the author of the book Great Wines Under $20.

She is an appraiser and member of the Appraisers Association of America and is a New York State licensed auctioneer.

Luray is a member of Tulane University's Deans Council. and Nassau County Museum of Arts Women's Council.

She is part of the team of Trust and Estates at Heritage Auctions the New York City.
