= 1909 Savannah axe murders =

Triple homicide in Savannah, Georgia

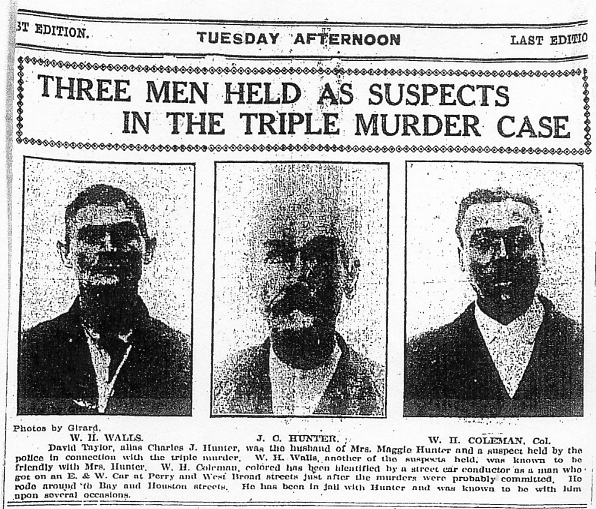
Suspects in the Savannah, Georgia, axe murders of 1909

The 1909 Savannah axe murders was a triple homicide that occurred at 401 West Perry Street in the downtown district of Savannah, Georgia, in December 1909. Though the public initially confronted the city's African-American community with the crime, the dying third victim, Maggie Hunter, stated that her estranged husband had attacked her. J. C. Hunter was sentenced to death for the murders in 1910. His sentence was commuted to life in prison one day before his execution date in 1911. He was eventually pardoned by the governor in 1923.

== Murder ==
On December 10, 1909, two women, Eliza Gribble and her daughter Carrie Ohlander, were discovered beaten to death inside the house. A third woman, Maggie Hunter, was found barely alive and later died from her injuries in the hospital. When police arrived on the scene, they found Carrie Ohlander's body in the hallway, and concluded that she had been criminally assaulted before her throat was slit. Carrie's mother, Eliza Gribble, was found in the back bedroom with her skull beaten in. Eliza Gribble, 70, was the owner of the house. She was originally from Cornwell, England, but had settled in Savannah before the Civil War with her late husband R. Gribble. She had rented the house with her daughter a short time before the murders occurred. Eliza was found sitting in her easy chair in the back bedroom. A newspaper and her reading glasses lay at her feet. She had received one to two blows to the back of the head and her grey head showed the imprint of an axe. Carrie Ohlander, 36, was Eliza Gribble's daughter. She was separated from her husband, Andrew J. Ohlander, who was living in Memphis, and had come to Savannah to live with her mother. Ohlander was partially deaf and believed to be the first to have been attacked, likely trying to protect her mother. Physicians determined she was criminally assaulted before having her throat cut and being beaten to death.

Maggie Hunter, 34, had just rented a room and moved into the Gribble House the day before the attacks occurred. She was estranged from her husband, J.C. Hunter, who was 30 years her senior, at the time, and was planning on making a living on her own by being a seamstress. J. C. Hunter had just brought a sewing machine over to the house the day before the murders.

Maggie was found barely alive at the front door of the house with her throat slit and her head beaten in. She died three days later in the hospital.

== Public reaction and trial ==
The crime happened early enough in the day to make the evening paper that night. The Savannah Evening Press reported the murders and caused frenzy in the town. A riot broke out with fences torn down and doors burst in as townspeople went on a witch-hunt for the murderer. Quickly, the story became national news. The Los Angeles Herald reported on December 11, 1909, "one hundred and fifty negroes are prisoners in the police station, awaiting examination." Mobs of men stormed the jail in outrage, making the prisoners fear for their lives.

However, a delirious Maggie Hunter, dying in the hospital, revealed to a Baptist minister, Reverend John S. Wilder, who was sitting at her bedside, the name of the killer. Maggie claimed that her husband, J. C. Hunter, was the one who struck her down. Police were notified, and Hunter was taken into custody after a search of his house revealed a bloody rag and bloody clothes.

On February 23, 1910, the Chatham County grand jury indicted three men―J. C. Hunter, Willie Walls and John Coker―for the murder of the three women. All men denied any knowledge of the crimes. On August 17, 1910, the jury convicted Hunter of murder, and the court sentenced him to death by hanging. He tried to appeal his conviction and sentence but was denied, and his execution date was set for December 22, 1911.

The day before his execution, Hunter was to be baptized in his jail cell by Reverend John S. Wilder. Hunter still proclaimed his innocence of the crimes and was told that the governor had commuted his sentence to life in prison. On October 27, 1923, Hunter was granted a pardon by Governor Clifford Walker and returned to Savannah.

== The accused ==
J. C. Hunter (David L. Taylor) was Maggie Hunter's husband. At the time of the murders, they were separated, with her living at the Gribble House residence and him living nearby at Montgomery and Congress Streets. He had served in the American Civil War as a soldier in the 63rd Regiment Georgia Volunteer Infantry until he was wounded in the Battle of Atlanta. Afterwards, he served jail time twice, once for stealing a horse and the other for bigamy. Upon his release, he adopted the name of Hunter. Hunter was a paperhanger and painter from Guyton, Georgia, and was 30 years older than Maggie Hunter, often referring to her as his daughter.

In her delirium while dying in the hospital, Maggie Hunter announced to Reverend John S. Wilder, J. C. Hunter's name as the man who had attacked her and murdered the other two women. Police quickly descended upon Hunter's residence and found a bloody rag stuffed in his fireplace, as well as a packet of bloodstained clothes in the house. Robert J. Travis, a Savannah lawyer who investigated the scene on his own, had also discovered one of his walking canes in the house.

Hunter was the only man to be fully tried for the killing. On August 17, 1910, the jury convicted him of the murders and the court sentenced him to death by hanging. On December 22, 1911, Hunter's sentence was reduced from hanging to a life in prison, and on October 27, 1923, he was granted a pardon by Governor Clifford Walker and returned to Savannah.

Willie Walls came under suspicion after admitting to the police that he had tried to see Maggie Hunter on the day the attacks and murders had occurred. Walls had also paid for Maggie's stay in the Gribble House for a month in full as she was estranged from her husband, J. C. Hunter. Walls was brought in for questioning and was held, but released on his own bond, as the case against him was extremely weak, and he never went to trial.

Bingham Bryan was put into custody under the alleged motive of robbery on January 25, 1910, by the Chatham County Sheriff's Department. It was believed Gribble had an old trunk filled with wills, stocks, and other valuable things. At the time of the murders, Bryan was the yardman for the property, and it was believed he knew the contents of the trunk. He was held, but never put on trial for the murders, as there was no evidence against him.

John Coker was also put on trial for the murders, but was the charges were dismissed before being sent to a jury deliberation, due to lack of evidence and unreliable witnesses.

== Tourist attraction ==
In 1944, the Gribble House and surrounding buildings were torn down to build the 15,000-square-foot warehouse that stands there now, located at 234 Martin Luther King Jr. Boulevard in Savannah. The warehouse is the former site of ghost tours, and was featured in an episode of Ghost Adventures in 2014.
