= Servant Girl Annihilator =

Unidentified serial killer active 1884–85 in Austin, Texas

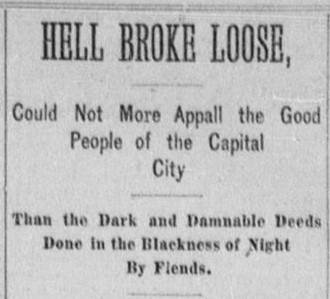
- December 1885 newspaper headline relating to The Servant Girl Annihilator

Details
- Victims: 8 known victims
- Span of crimes: December 30, 1884 – December 24, 1885
- Country: United States
- State: Texas

The Servant Girl Annihilator, also known as the Midnight Assassin, was an unidentified American serial killer active in Austin, Texas, between 1884 and 1885. Contemporary sources referred to the crimes as the "Servant Girl Murders", while the moniker "Servant Girl Annihilator" was later coined by the writer O. Henry. Between December 1884 and December 1885, the perpetrator targeted victims in their beds at night––primarily female domestic servants––killing seven women and one man while seriously injuring several others. Despite the extensive investigation and hundreds of arrests, no one was ever convicted, and the killings ceased abruptly by the end of 1885.

In its December 26, 1885, issue The New York Times reported that the "murders were committed by some cunning madman, who is insane on the subject of killing women." The attacks represent one of the earliest documented examples of a serial killer operating in the United States, preceding the Jack the Ripper murders in Whitechapel by nearly three years.

Following the Whitechapel murders, speculation arose that the crimes might have been committed by the same culprit active in Austin, though no connection was ever established. According to historian Philip Sugden in The Complete History of Jack the Ripper, the conjecture originated in October 1888, when an editor with the Atlanta Constitution linked the cases following the murders of Elizabeth Stride and Catherine Eddowes in London.

== Historical context ==
In the mid-1880s, Austin, Texas, was a rapidly expanding inland capital balancing its frontier heritage with intense ambitions of modernization. According to U.S. census figures, the city's population rose from 11,013 in 1880 to 14,575 in 1890, fuelled by expanding railroad connections, commercial growth along Congress Avenue and, civic projects such as the construction of a new state capitol building. The city also introduced modern infrastructure, including electric street lighting, via tall iron moonlight towers, yet large parts of residential Austin remained dimly lit, uneven, and sparsely patrolled at night.

Beneath this civic ambition lay rigid hierarchies of race, class, and gender in post-Reconstruction Texas. Austin's growing economy relied heavily on working-class and newly freed African American laborers, as well as European migrants who filled essential service, domestic, and manual jobs. Many domestic servants lived in small, detached wooden cabins or outbuildings behind employers' homes or in modest neighborhoods connected by narrow alleys and lanes, leaving them exposed to nighttime intruders.

These social divisions, strongly influenced how local officials, newspapers, and residents reacted to the violence. Early attacks largely targeted Black women and working-class households, receiving comparatively limited attention and resources at first, whereas the killings of two white women on Christmas Eve 1885 propped heightened citywide alarm and political scrutiny. Meanwhile, a small municipal police force struggled to patrol a sprawling, rapidly growing city, eventually prompting expanding policing measures, rewards, and citizen night patrols as fear mounted.

== Murders ==
As the attacks continued through 1885, the string of brutal murders caused widespread panic throughout Austin. Residents lived in intense fear, leading to local curfews, increased police deployment, and armed citizen patrols guarding the darkened streets. Despite these precautions, the perpetrator repeatedly evaded capture, leaving the capital city gripped by an escalating sense of dread.

According to U.S. Census figures, compiled by the City of Austin, the population grew from 11,013 in 1880 to 14,575 in 1890. During this period, many of the targeted women worked as domestic servants and lived in small, isolated wooden cabins or outbuildings behind their employers' residences, leaving them vulnerable to nighttime intruders.

According to contemporary accounts and historical reviews, the killer claimed the lives of several victims across multiple demographics, while seriously injuring several others. victims were attacked indoors by the intruder while asleep in their beds, using heavy bludgeoning equipment such as axes and bricks.

All the victims were attacked indoors while asleep in their beds. Five of the women were dragged, unconscious but still alive, and killed outdoors. Three of the women were severely mutilated while outdoors.

All the victims were posed in a similar manner. Six of the murdered women had a "sharp object" inserted into their ears.

The series of murders ended with the killing of two white women, Eula Phillips, age 17, and Susan Hancock, who was attacked while sleeping in the bed of her 16-year-old daughter on the night of December 24, 1885. Moses Hancock was accused of killing his wife, but was acquitted shortly afterwards.

Only one of those arrested, James Phillips, husband of Eula Phillips, was convicted. Witnesses testified that he repeatedly said he would kill Eula if he ever found her to be unfaithful, and that he was prone to violent outbursts. He was found guilty of murdering his wife but the conviction was later overturned, citing insufficient evidence.

London authorities questioned several American cowboys, one of whom (according to the authors of Jack the Ripper, A to Z) was possibly Buck Taylor, a performer in Buffalo Bill's Wild West Show. Taylor was born in Fredericksburg, Texas, about 70 miles west of Austin.

According to a front-page article in The New York Times of December 26, 1885, 400 men were arrested during the course of the year. According to the Texas Monthly, powerful elected officials refused to believe that one man, or one group of men, was responsible for all the murders.

The African-American community and some practitioners of voodoo believed the killer was a white man who had magic powers that enabled him to become invisible, as no dogs outside or in fenced yards adjacent to locations where murders occurred were heard to bark or raise any alarm.

The series of murders stopped when additional police officers were hired, rewards were offered, and citizens formed a vigilance committee to patrol the streets at night. Contemporary newspapers reported that the murderer(s) had apparently fled the area, as no more murders were officially attributed to the killer by the authorities.

=== Victims ===
- December 30, 1884: Mollie Smith, age 25, became the first recorded fatality of the series, killed while asleep. Walter Spencer was seriously wounded during the same attack.
- March 19, 1885: Clara Strand and Christine Martenson, two Swedish domestic servants, were seriously wounded in a nighttime assault.
- May 6, 1885: Eliza Shelly was murdered in her quarters.
- May 22, 1885: Irene Cross was murdered by a male assailant using a knife.
- August 1885: Clara Dick sustained severe wounds during an attack.
- August 30, 1885: Mary Ramey, age 11, was murdered, and her mother, Rebecca Ramey, was seriously wounded.
- September 28, 1885: Gracie Vance and her boyfriend, Orange Washington, were murdered.
- December 24, 1885: Susan Hancock was murdered.
- December 24, 1885: Eula Phillips was murdered.

=== Eyewitness accounts ===
According to a July 2000 article in the Texas Monthly, there was an eyewitness who claimed to have seen the murderer, but reported contradictory information to the police.

The killer was variously reported to have been white or dark-complexioned; or a "yellow man" (meaning a light-skinned black person, or mixed-race person) wearing lampblack to conceal his skin color; or a man wearing a Mother Hubbard style dress; or a man wearing a slouch hat; or a man wearing a hat and a white rag that covered the lower part of his face.

There were also reports that the killer worked with an accomplice, or belonged to a gang of murderers.

=== Suspects ===
==== Nathan Elgin ====
On July 15, 2014, the PBS TV show History Detectives aired an episode on the killings. Using a combination of historical research and modern techniques, including psychological and geographic profiling, they identified a suspect: Nathan Elgin, a 19-year-old African-American cook.

Elgin lived and worked in close proximity to several of the crime scenes. Historical records noted that he was missing his little toe, a detail that aligned with a distinct footprint believed to have been left by the perpetrator at one of the locations. In February 1886, shortly after the final murders, Elgin was shot and killed by police while attempting to assault a woman with a knife. Because the killing spree abruptly ceased following his death, many contemporary observers suspected his involvement; however, because he was never formally questioned or tried, the case remains historically unsolved.

=== Multi-Perpetrator and Gang Theories ===
While modern analysis and historical overviews frequently examine the killings through the lens of a lone serial killer, contemporary law enforcement and press reports during 1885 and 1887 frequently pointed towards localised crime elements and multi-perpetrator gang activity.

During the investigations and subsequent trails – such as the legal proceedings and surrounding the murder of Susan Hancock and the arrests of various suspects – authorities noted that local officials and detectives suspected the involvement of a loose network of criminal associates. For instance, reports citing Huston Detective Hennessy suggested that figures held and later released, such as Glen Drummer, Oliver Townsend, and Doc Woods, were responsible for the coordinated wave of violence. Contemporary testimony also highlighted that certain victims or witnesses, including Lucinda Boddy had implicated individuals such as Doc Woods during separate attacks.

Furthermore, historical records indicate that local trials targeted diverse suspects across racial lines – including the prosecution of withe husbands such as James Phillips and Moses Hancock for the dealths of Eula Phillips and Susan Hancock – reflecting a complex and shifting legal landscape that extended far beyond a single profile.

== In popular culture ==
William Sydney Porter, better known as the short story writer O. Henry, was living in Austin at the time of the murders. Porter coined the term "Servant Girl Annihilators" in a May 10, 1885, letter addressed to his friend Dave Hall and later included in his anthology Rolling Stones: "Town is fearfully dull," wrote Porter, "except for the frequent raids of the Servant Girl Annihilators, who make things lively in the dull hours of the night...." However, no contemporary newspaper or published source referred to the murderer(s) as "The Servant Girl Annihilator."

In 2000, Steven Saylor published the novel A Twist at the End, which closely reconstructed the murders and the ensuing trials, with young William Sydney Porter playing a fictional role. The novel was published in the United Kingdom (as Honour the Dead) and has been translated into Portuguese and Hungarian.

Episode 6 (2015) of the podcast Tanis, a mystery/suspense docudrama, is titled "The Servant Girl Annihilator." It suggests a connection between the killings and the mysteries central to the podcast's ongoing story.

== See also ==
- List of fugitives from justice who disappeared
- List of serial killers in the United States

== Cited works and further reading ==
- Franscell, Ron (2010). Crime Buff's Guide to Outlaw Texas. Guildford, Connecticut: Guildford Press. ISBN 978-0-762-75965-1.
- Hollandsworth, Skip (2016). The Midnight Assassin. New York, NY: Henry Holt and Co. ISBN 9780805097672.
