= Kaiama L. Glover =

Translator and scholar

- Education: Columbia University (Ph.D.); Harvard University (B.A.)
- Occupations: Professor, Yale University
- Notable work: A Regarded Self: Caribbean Womanhood and the Ethics of Disorderly Being (2021); Haiti Unbound: A Spiralist Challenge to the Postcolonial Canon (2011)

Kaiama L. Glover is a translator and scholar of Black Studies, French and Literary Studies. She is a professor at Yale University in the Faculty of Arts and Sciences. Alongside her academic work, she is known for her translations of Frankétienne, Marie Chauvet, and René Depestre. She was formerly the Ann Whitney Olin Professor of French & Africana Studies at Barnard College, where she also served as Faculty Director for the Barnard Digital Humanities Center

== Education ==
Kaiama L. Glover received a B.A. in French History and Literature and Afro-American Studies from Harvard University and a Ph.D. in French and Romance Philology from Columbia University.

== Work ==
Glover's work focuses on French, Caribbean, and Haitian literature. Her first monograph, Haiti Unbound: A Spiralist Challenge to the Postcolonial Canon, explored the works of Frankétienne, Jean–Claude Fignolé, and René Philoctète, all exemplars of the Haitian literary movement, Spiralism. In 2017, Glover published her second monograph, A Regarded Self: Caribbean Womanhood and the Ethics of Disorderly Being, which focused on "unruly" female protagonists of Caribbean Literature, drawing specifically from Marie Chauvet, Maryse Condé, René Depestre, Marlon James, and Jamaica Kincaid.

In addition to her published monographs, Glover has contributed to the field of digital humanities through projects such as In the Same Boats, which visualizes networks of "Caribbean, Latin American, African, European, and Afro-American intellectuals" in the 20th century. She also serves as a founding co-editor of archipelagos | a journal of Caribbean digital praxis.
