= Mary Russell murders =

1828 mass murder at sea

The Mary Russell was a trading boat that set sail from the harbour of Cobh, Ireland, on 8 February 1828, carrying a cargo of mules bound for Barbados. When it returned to Cobh on 25 June 1828, the ship's captain had brutally murdered seven of his crewmen. The story was largely forgotten until 2010, when The Ship of Seven Murders, a book which detailed the case, was published.

Built in 1817, the Mary Russell was a small wooden brig of 132 tonnes, drawing 13 feet under load, single-decked with beams. That tonnage would make it about 80 feet in length. The ship was built entirely of wood, with wooden masts and rope rigging. The bottom was sheathed in copper to protect the vessel from shipworm.

== Crew ==
The ship's captain was William Stewart, a Protestant man born in Cobh in 1775. His chief mate was a Scotsman named William Smith, and his second mate was a Swede named William Swanson. Also on board were John Cramer, the ship's carpenter; seamen John Howes, Francis Sullivan and John Keating; and three apprentices – John Deaves (aged 15), Daniel Scully (13), and Henry Rickards (12). There were also two stablemen on board to look after the mules: Timothy Connell and James Morley. In addition to the crew, there was one passenger on board: an eleven-year-old boy named Thomas Hammond.

Captain James Gould Raynes, a Cork man, who had sailed to Barbados on board Hibernia, was relieved of his command for drunkenness. After much persuasion, he was granted passage back to Cork by Captain Stewart on board the Mary Russell.

== Murders ==
Following a dream, Captain Stewart grew suspicious of the crew and feared a mutiny led by Captain Raynes. That Raynes would speak in Irish to the crew added to Stewart's paranoia.

Captain Stewart first bound the seven men by hand and foot, pinioning them to the floor of the ship's main saloon. He then systematically killed them all, attacking them first with a crowbar, and then with an axe.

== Trial ==
On Sunday, 11 August 1828, Captain Stewart was tried for murder of Captain James Gould Raynes at Cork Assizes. Unusually, both prosecution and defence were seeking the same verdict: not guilty by reason of insanity. Daniel O’Connell was engaged to appear for the prosecution at Stewart’s trial, but was unable to attend as he was fighting the pivotal by-election in County Clare that first elected him to the House of Commons.
