= Joseph Ntshongwana =

South African rugby player and convicted multiple murderer

Joseph Ntshongwana is a former South African rugby player who played for the Blue Bulls from 1998 to 2001. He appeared in the Vodacom Cup and Currie Cup tournaments for the Blue Bulls, winning nine caps in the Vodacom and two in the Currie.

== Murder conviction ==
Ntshongwana was arrested in 2011 for hacking four men to death and wounding two others with an axe, allegedly to avenge the gang rape and subsequent HIV-infection of his daughter earlier in 2011. However, the police later reported that the rape never occurred. At his arraignment, Ntshongwana was violent and spoke in tongues.

At a mental competency hearing in January 2012, it was revealed that Ntshongwana, now known as "The Axe Man", was mentally ill, suffering from schizoaffective disorder. His father told the court his son suffered from bipolar disorder.

A psychiatrist testified that Ntshongwana was not mentally unstable and that the murders were premeditated and deliberate. In February 2012, a Durban court declared him fit to stand trial. In September 2014, Ntshongwana was convicted of the murders, as well as two counts of attempted murder, one of assault with intent to commit grievous bodily harm, one of kidnapping, and one count of rape. In December 2014, he was sentenced to five life sentences in the Kwazulu-Natal High Court.
