= Jacques Stephen Alexis =

Haitian novelist, poet and activist

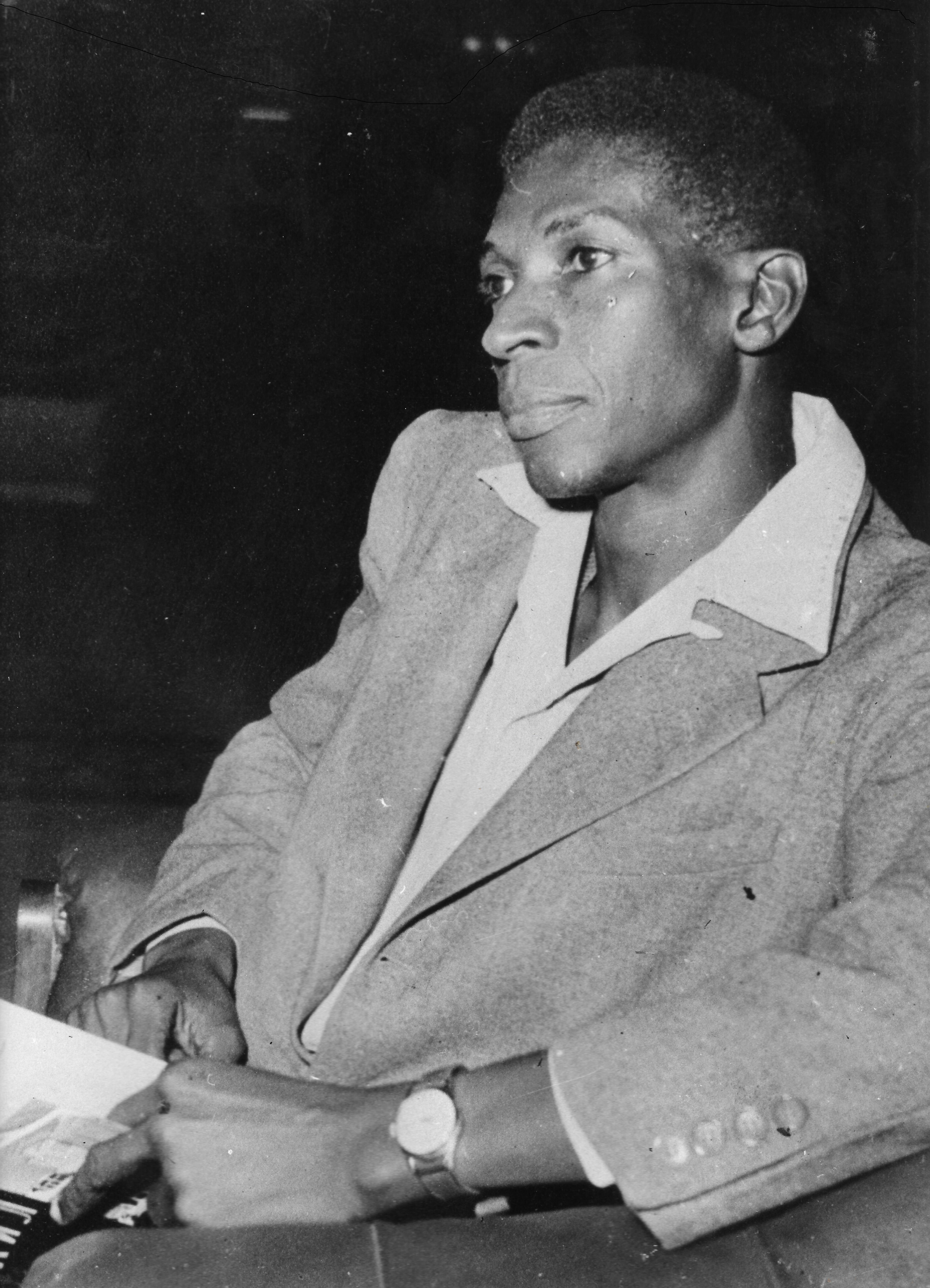
- Jacques Stéphen Alexis in the lobby of the Hotel Moskva, 1959
- Born: April 22, 1922; Gonaïves, Haiti
- Died: April 22, 1961 (aged 39); Casernes Dessalines, Haiti
- Cause of death: Presumed homicide
- Occupations: Communist novelist, poet, and activist
- Known for: Writing the novel Compère Général Soleil

Jacques Stephen Alexis (22 April 1922 – c. 22 April 1961) was a Haitian novelist, poet, physician and communist activist. He is best known for his novel Compère Général Soleil (1955).

== Biography ==
Alexis was born in Gonaïves, the son of journalist, historian and diplomat Stephen Alexis and Lydia Nuñez, descendant of one of Haiti's founding fathers, Jean-Jacques Dessalines. His mother was Dominican. Alexis grew up in a family in which literary and political discussions were the norm. At the age of 18, he made what was regarded as remarkable literary debut with an essay about the Haitian poet, Hamilton Garoute. He collaborated on a number of literary reviews, before founding La Ruche, a group dedicated to creating a literary and social spring in Haiti in the early 1940s. After completing medical school in Paris, he traveled throughout Europe and lived for a few years in Cuba.

In 1955, his novel Compère Général Soleil, was published by Gallimard in Paris. The novel has been translated into English as General Sun, My Brother. He followed up with Les Arbres musiciens (1957), L'Espace d'un cillement (1959), and Romancero aux étoiles (1960).

More than just an intellectual, Jacques Stephen Alexis was also an active participant in the social and political debates of his time. In 1959, he formed the People's Consensus Party (Parti pour l'Entente Nationale-PEP), a left-wing political party, but he was forced into exile by the Duvalier dictatorship. In August 1960, he attended a Moscow meeting of representatives of 81 communist parties from all over the world, and signed a common accord document called "The Declaration of the 81" in the name of Haitian communists.

In April 1961, he returned to Haiti, but soon after landing in Bombardopolis he was arrested. He was arrested under the name Joseph Thevenot, although he later revealed his true identity. He had a sum of exactly $13,000 on him and he was taken to Port-au-Prince by a Haitian Coast Guard boat and later incarcerated in Fort Dimanche. Taken to the Casernes Dessalines to be interrogated by Papa Doc he was never seen again.

He died in Casernes Dessalines, Haiti, survived by his wife Andree Roumer, niece of eminent Haitian poet Émile Roumer, his daughter Florence Alexis and his son, Jean-Jacques Stephen Alexis (AKA: JanJak II).

== See also ==
- List of solved missing person cases

== Bibliography ==
- Compère Général Soleil (1955). General Sun, My Brother, trans. Carrol F. Coates (1999).
- Les Arbres musiciens (1957).
- L'Espace d'un cillement (1959). In the Flicker of an Eyelid, trans. Carrol F. Coates and Edwidge Danticat (2002).
- Romancero aux étoiles (1960).
- L'étoile Absinthe, suivi de Le léopard (2017).

== Books ==
- Maximilien Laroche, Le Romancero aux étoiles et l'œuvre romanesque de Jacques-Stephen Alexis, 1978 Maximilien Laroche, Le réalisme merveilleux dans Les arbres musiciens de Jacques-Stéphen Alexis, GRELCA, 1987 Maximilien Laroche, Contribution à l'étude du réalisme merveilleux, Collection Essais, Québec, GRELCA. 1987 N.B. Many other books and articles of Maximilien Laroche analyse the Works of Jacques Stephen Alexis. Professor Laroche having contributed to the making better known the importance of Jacques Stephen Alexis, his students at Laval University and around the world have published many books and articles -some of which can be found at the Library of Lava l University l. [1] [archive]
- Rodriguez, Emilio Jorge, Haiti and Trans-Caribbean Literary Identity / Haití y la transcaribeñidad literaria. St. Martin: House of Nehesi Publishers, 2011. ISBN 978-0-9888252-5-3
- Rodriguez, Emilio Jorge (2013). Haïti et l'identité littéraire trans-caribéenne. St. Martin: House of Nehesi Publishers. ISBN 9780913441589.
- Schutt-Ainé, Patricia; Staff of Librairie Au Service de la Culture (1994). Haiti: A Basic Reference Book. Miami, Florida: Librairie Au Service de la Culture. p. 100. ISBN 0-9638599-0-0.
