= Issa El-Saieh & His Orchestra discography =

This is the discography of recordings by Issa El-Saieh & His Orchestra, also referred to as Orchestre Saieh, including those of various bands put together by bandleader Issa El-Saieh, through combinations of musicians from the orchestra, such as The Belle Créole Group, La Belle Créole Trio, Bebo Valdés & His Rhythm, Rodolphe Legros & His Ibo Lele Group, Budd Johnson & The Le Perchoir Group, Wébert Sicot & His Cabane Choucoune Ensemble, The Cabane Choucoune Ensemble, Guy Durosier & His Rhythm or Rodolphe Legros & His Ibo Lele Group.

== Discography ==
=== La Belle Créole (1947-1956) ===
The recordings made on the La Belle Créole music label - created by Issa El-Saieh in 1947 - were produced and supervised by El Saieh. The recordings took place in different locations such as Cabane Choucoune, Radio Commerce or Ricardo Widmaier’s Radio Haiti (in Port-au-Prince and Pétion-Ville) as well as in Miami, New-York and Havana (mainly at Radio Progreso). The double track records were on 78 rpm discs, mainly in a 10 inch format. The multiple track records were on 33 rmp discs, on 10 or 12 inch formats.

Year	Title (genre)	Orchestra	Notes
1947	side A: Audan na mire (Yanvalou) side B: Senti foula (Congo)	Issa El-Saieh & His Orchestra	• Vocals on both tracks by Joseph Trouillot (Ti Jo)
1947	side A: Carelite (Meringue) side B: Dans tes bras (Meringue)	Issa El-Saieh & His Orchestra	• Dans tes bras: composed by Arsène Desgrottes, melody by Issa El-Saieh • Vocals on both tracks by Joseph Trouillot (Ti Jo)
1948	side A: Cabane Choucoune (Meringue) side B: Plontonnade (Congo)	Issa El-Saieh & His Orchestra	• Cabane Choucoune: composed by Budd Johnson and Issa El-Saieh • Vocals on both tracks by Joseph Trouillot (Ti Jo)
1950	side A: Ti mâmâ (Meringue) side B: Carolina Cao (Congo)	Issa El-Saieh & His Orchestra	• Vocals on both tracks by Joseph Trouillot (Ti Jo)
1950	side A: Cabane Choucoune (Beguine) side B: Panama’m tombé (Congo)	Issa El-Saieh & His Orchestra	• Cabane Choucoune: composed by Budd Johnson and Issa El-Saieh • Panama’m tombé is a well known song in the Haitian traditional folklore repertoire, made following the death of Haitian president Florvil Hyppolite (1828 - 1896) • Vocals on both tracks by Joseph Trouillot (Ti Jo)
1950	side A: Roi tcha-tcha (Meringue) side B: Basilica (Meringue)	Issa El-Saieh & His Orchestra	• Vocals on both tracks by Joseph Trouillot (Ti Jo)
1951	side A: Macaya (Petro) side B: Ministre Azaca (Yanvalou)	Issa El-Saieh & His Orchestra	• Vocals on both tracks by Guy Durosier (Ti Guy)
1951	side A: Marié bon marié pa bon (Meringue) side B: Dodo Turgeau (Meringue)	Saieh & His Orchestra	• Vocals on both tracks by Guy Durosier (Ti Guy)
1951	side A: Feuille side B: Creole Fantasy	The Belle Creole Group	• Vocals on both tracks by Guy Durosier (Ti Guy)
1951	side A: Manzelle Roza (Meringue) side B: Erzulie Freda (Meringue)	La Belle Creole Trio	• Manzelle Roza: vocals sung by Guy Durosier (Ti Guy) • Piano on both tracks by Billy Taylor
1951	side A: Souvenir d’Haïti (Meringue) side B: Angelico (Meringue)	La Belle Creole Trio	• Souvenir d’Haïti is based on a poem/song, written by Othello Bayard in 1920 • Piano on both tracks by Billy Taylor
1951	side A: Cherie side B: Ma Brune (Bolero - Beguine)	Saieh & His Orchestra	• Cherie: was composed by Issa El-Saieh and Budd Johnson • Ma Brune: was composed by Guy Durosier (Ti Guy), who also performed the vocals on this track
1951	side A: Angelico (Meringue) side B: If you should leave me (Si tu t’en vas) (Beguine - Foxtrot)	Saieh & His Orchestra	• If you should leave me (Si tu t’en vas): was composed by Issa El-Saieh and Budd Johnson • Vocals on both tracks by Guy Durosier (Ti Guy)
1951	side A: Moin tendé youn canon qui tiré (Yanvalou) side B: Cousin (Congo)	unknown	• Percussions on both tracks by Raymond Ballergeau (Ti Roro), Marcel Jean (Ti Marcel) and René Dor (Ti Dor) • Vocals on both tracks by Joseph Trouillot (Ti Joe), Guy Durosier (Ti Guy), Herbert Widmaier (Herby) and Rodolphe Legros (Dodof)
1952	side A: La Reine Soleil (Congo) side B: Panama’m tombé (Congo)	Issa El-Saieh & His Orchestra	• Panama’m tombé: is a well known song in the Haitian traditional folklore repertoire, made following the death of Haitian president Florvil Hyppolite (1828 - 1896) • Vocals on both tracks by Joseph Trouillot (Ti Jo)
1955	side A: Yoyo (Meringue) side B: Pese Cafe (Congo)	Issa El-Saieh & His Orchestra	• Vocals on both tracks by Guy Durosier (Ti Guy)
1955	side A: Jacot (Meringue) side B: Sharpshooter (Guaracha)	Issa El-Saieh & His Orchestra	• Jacot: was composed by Rodolphe Legros (Dodof)? • Sharpshooter: lyrics written by Antoine Radule • Vocals on both tracks by Joseph Trouillot (Ti Jo)
1955	side A: Bam pa’m sans douce (Meringue) side B: Ti Zandor (Petro)	Bebo Valdés & His Rhythm	• Bam pa’m sans douce was composed by Issa El-Saieh • Vocals on both tracks by Rodolphe Legros (Dodof)
1955	side A: Tu’em jète’m nan depotoir side B: Cornes (Si vous avez des cornes) (Ibo)	Bebo Valdés & His Group	• Cornes (Si vous avez des cornes) was composed by Raoul Guillaume, and vocals were performed by Rodolphe Legros (Dodof)
1955	side A: Diane (Meringue) side B: Péligre (Carnaval 1955) (Meringue)	Bebo Valdés & His Rhythm	• Diane was composed by Capitaine Luc Jean-Baptiste • Péligre (Carnaval 1955) was composed and performed by Rodolphe Legros (Dodof)
1955	side A: Ouangol, oh (Petro) side B: Tous les jours’m sou (Meringue)	Rodolphe Legros & His Ibo Lele Group	
1955	side A: Moin dit ou oui - ou dit moi non (Guaracha / Meringue) side B: Mon Capitaine (Meringue)	Budd Johnson & The Perchoir Group	• Moin dit ou oui - ou dit moi non: vocals by the Dor brothers and piano solo by Ernest Lamy (Nono) • Mon Capitaine: vocals by Joseph Trouillot (Ti Jo)
1955	side A: Patience ma fille (Meringue) side B: Hougan cabrit (Afro)	Budd Johnson & The Perchoir Group	• Patience ma fille was composed by Issa El-Saieh • Vocals on both tracks by Rodolphe Legros (Dodof)
1955	side A: Contredanse N°1 (Meringue) side B: Ché-ché	Wébert Sicot & His Cabane Choucoune Ensemble	• Vocals on both tracks by Joseph Trouillot (Ti Jo), René Dor (Ti Dor) and Gérard Dupervil • Alto solo on both tracks by Wébert Sicot
1955	side A: Rédi-rédi (Meringue) side B: Marabout de mon coeur	Wébert Sicot & His Cabane Choucoune Ensemble	• Marabout de mon coeur was composed by Rodolphe Legros (Dodof) and Émile Roumer • Vocals on both tracks by Joseph Trouillot (Ti Jo), René Dor (Ti Dor) and Gérard Dupervil • Alto solo on track A by Wébert Sicot
1955	Songs from Voodoo Haiti (album title) side A: 1. Feuille; 2. Dans tes bras 3. Cabane Choucoune; 4. Ma brune; side B: 1. Creole Fantasy; 2. Ministre Azaca; 3. Carolina Cao; 4. Panama’m tombe	Issa El-Saieh & His Orchestra	The tracks on this album were re-recorded and released in 1955, by the Supertone label of Monogram Records, under the title "Exotic Songs from Voodoo Haiti by Issa EL SAIEH - Haiti’s greatest orchestral conductor and his outstanding Haitian Orchestra".
1956	side A: Avadra (Meringue) side B: Coumbite	The Cabane Choucoune Ensemble	• Coumbite composed by Joseph Trouillot (Ti Jo)? • Vocals on both tracks by Joseph Trouillot (Ti Jo)
1956	side A: Le coq chante (Meringue) side B: Nous ce fan-mi (Meringue)	The Cabane Choucoune Ensemble	• Nous ce fan-mi composed by Wébert Sicot? • Vocals on both tracks by Joseph Trouillot (Ti Jo)
1956	side A: Rele'm (Petro) side B: Patience ma fille (Meringue)	Issa El-Saieh & His Orchestra	• Rele'm composed by Issa El-Saieh? • Patience ma fille composed by Issa El-Saieh • Vocals and chorus on both tracks by Guy Durosier (Ti Guy), Herbert Widmaier (Herby) and René Dor (Ti Dor)
1956	side A: Au Perchoir (Meringue) side B: Con ça nous ye (fèy nan bwa) (Petro)	Issa El-Saieh & His Orchestra	• Au Perchoir composed by Issa El-Saieh • Con ça nous ye (fèy nan bwa) composed by Issa El-Saieh? with vocals and chorus performed by Guy Durosier (Ti Guy), Herbert Widmaier (Herby) and René Dor (Ti Dor)
1956	side A: Magie nan caille la side B: Bam pa’m sans douce (Meringue)	Issa El-Saieh & His Orchestra	• Magie nan caille la composed by Issa El-Saieh?; piano solo performed by Bebo Valdés • Bam pa’m sans douce composed by Issa El-Saieh? • Vocals and chorus on both tracks by Guy Durosier (Ti Guy), Herbert Widmaier (Herby) and René Dor (Ti Dor)
1956	side A: Oua mene’m allez (Piano meringue) side B: Merci Bon Dieu (Congo)	Issa El-Saieh & His Orchestra	• Oua mene’m allez composed by Issa El-Saieh and Benítez; piano solo performed by Bebo Valdés • Merci Bon Dieu composed by Issa El-Saieh; piano solo performed by Bebo Valdés • Vocals and chorus on both tracks by Guy Durosier (Ti Guy), Herbert Widmaier (Herby) and René Dor (Ti Dor)
1956	side A: Mathilda (Calypso) side B: Mouin cout nan ça	Guy Durosier & His Rhythm	• Mathilda composed by Harry (F.?) Thomas & Guy Durosier (Ti Guy)?; piano performed by Bebo Valdés, alto sax solo by Guy Durosier (Ti Guy) • Mouin cout nan ça composed by Guy Durosier (Ti Guy)?; piano solo performed by Bebo Valdés • Vocals on both tracks by Guy Durosier (Ti Guy)
1956	side A: Tarlatane (Meringue) side B: Fais chemin ou	Guy Durosier & His Rhythm	• Tarlatane composed by Guy Durosier (Ti Guy)? • Fais chemin ou composed by Guy Durosier (Ti Guy)? • Vocals on both tracks by Guy Durosier (Ti Guy)
1956	side A: A woman in love (Beguine) side B: Choucoune (Congo)	Issa El-Saieh & His Orchestra	• A woman in love lyrics by Frank Loesser for the 1955 film "Guys and Dolls" • Choucoune lyrics by Haitian poet Oswald Durand; original composer Michel Mauléart Monton • Vocals on both tracks by Herbert Widmaier (Herby)
1956	side A: Haiti (Meringue) side B: Arona leve (Meringue)	Issa El-Saieh & His Orchestra	• Haiti: composed by Marcel L. Sylvain • Arona leve: composed by Issa El-Saieh? • Vocals on both tracks by Guy Durosier (Ti Guy)
1956	side A: 1. Con ça nous ye 2. Ouangol oh 3. Tous les jours m’sou 4. Ciseaux; side B: 1. Magie nan caille la 2. Papa Pierre; 3. Ibo Lélé; 4. Feuilles nan bois	Rodolphe Legros & His Ibo Lele Group	• Featuring Bebo Valdés on piano
1956	side A: 1. Contredanse N°1; 2. Che che 3. Redi-redi; 4. Marabout de mon coeur; side B: 1. Coumbite; 2. Le coq chante 3. Avadra; 4. Nou ce fan mi	The Cabane Choucoune Ensemble	• Marabout de mon coeur: composed by Rodolphe Legros & Émile Roumer • Coumbite: composed by Joseph Trouillot

=== Exotic Songs from Voodoo Haiti by Issa El Saieh (1955) ===
Titled Exotic Songs from Voodoo Haiti by Issa El Saieh - Haiti’s greatest orchestral conductor and his outstanding Haitian Orchestra, the 10 inch LP album was recorded and released in 1955, by the Supertone label of Monogram Records, and produced by Manuel M. «Manny» Warner. Album cover design by Freund Lurye.

=== Issa El-Saieh presents Hi Fi Haitian Drums (1957) ===
Titled Issa El-Saieh presents Hi Fi Haitian Drums, the 33 rmp 12 inch LP album was recorded in Haiti in 1957, and released by Capitol Records in September 1957. Supervised and compiled by El-Saieh, the 12 tracks feature famed drummers Raymond Ballergeau (Ti Roro), Marcel Jean (Ti Marcel) as well as vocalists Guy Durosier, Joseph Trouillot (Ti Jo) and Renée Mirault, to name a few.

=== Issa El Saieh presents Voodoo Drums in Hi Fi (1958) ===
Titled Issa El Saieh presents Voodoo Drums in Hi Fi, the 33 rmp 12 inch LP album was recorded in Haiti in 1958, and released by Atlantic Records in September 1958. Recorded under the supervision of Issa El-Saieh (also musical director) and Joseph Trouillot, with Herbert Widmaier (Herby) as recording engineer. Album cover photo by Lee Friedlander, and cover design by Marvin Israel.

=== Issa El-Saieh & His Haitian Orchestra (1958) ===
Titled Issa El-Saieh & His Haitian Orchestra, this double track 78 rmp 10 inch LP was recorded in Haiti and released by Monogram Records in 1958. It features the songs Panama‘m tombe and Creole fantasy.

=== Mini Records (1997-2007) ===
• 1997: Issa El Saieh El Maestro et son orchestre, avec Guy Durosier

• 2007: Issa El Saieh - La Belle Époque (Volume 1)

• 2007: Issa El Saieh - La Belle Époque (Volume 2)
