= Issa El-Saieh =

Haitian musician and gallerist (1919–2005)

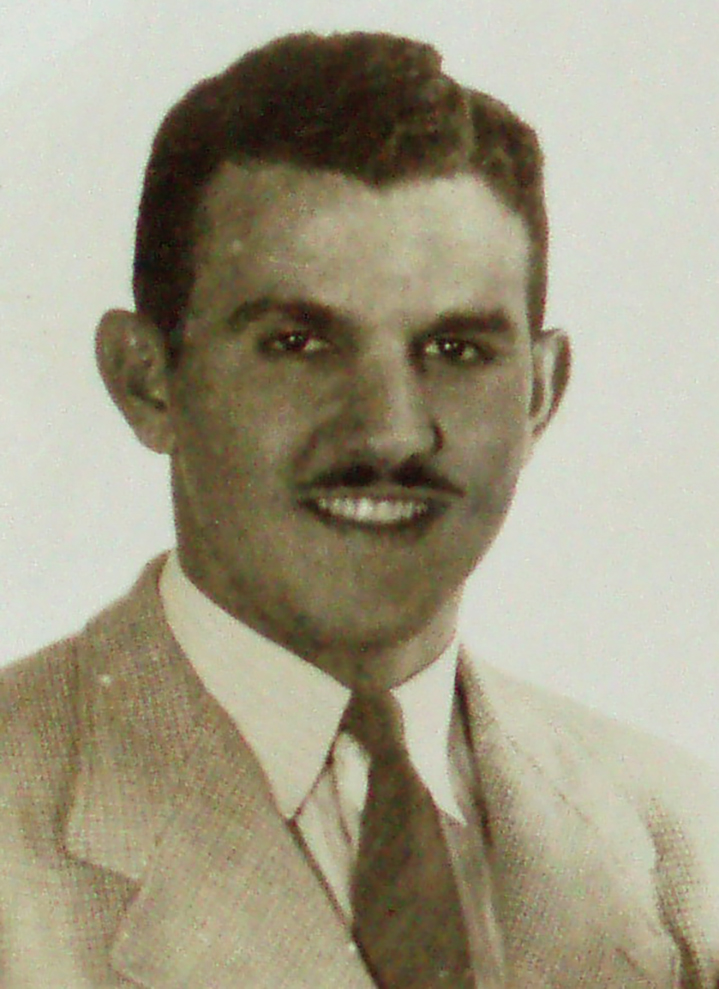
- El-Saieh in 1940
- Born: 22 February 1919; Petit-Goâve, Haiti
- Died: 2 February 2005 (aged 85); Port-au-Prince, Haiti
- Other name: Maestro
- Occupation: Composer • bandleader • conductor • instrumentalist • gallerist
- Partner: Fernande Stark (1951–1958)
- Children: Jean-Emmanuel El-Saieh • Marie-Elisabeth El-Saieh
- Parent: Joseph Said El-Saieh • Julia Moussa Talamas
- Relatives: Elias Noustas (brother) • André El-Saieh (brother)
- Honours: Knight of the National Order of Honour and Merit of Haiti

Issa Joseph El-Saieh (February 22, 1919 – February 2, 2005), also known as Maestro, was a Haitian saxophonist, clarinetist, bandleader, composer, arranger, businessman, gallerist and art collector of Palestinian descent.

Throughout his life and work he contributed to two facets of Haitian culture: music as well as art.

From 1941 to the mid-1950s, as a musician, composer, arranger and bandleader of the Orchestre Saieh. In parallel to his music career, he began buying and collecting Haitian art. By the late 1950s, he founded the Galerie Issa, through which he promoted Haitian art and culture abroad.

He died in Port-au-Prince from esophageal cancer on February 2, 2005, at the age of 85.

== Early life and education ==
Issa El-Saieh was born in Petit-Goâve, Haiti, on February 22, 1919. Both his parents, Julia Moussa Talamas and Joseph Said El-Saieh, were Palestinian Christians who immigrated separately to Haiti from Bethlehem, Palestine.

His mother, twice a widow, was a businesswoman who raised her three sons, Elias Noustas, Issa and André El-Saieh, between Petit-Goâve and Port-au-Prince.

El-Saieh attended Saint-Louis de Gonzague in Port-au-Prince. In 1928, his younger brother André and him were sent to various boarding schools in the United States, mainly in Massachusetts. There, he was introduced to music and learned to play the clarinet as well as the saxophone, and was a member of his school bands.

== Family businesses ==
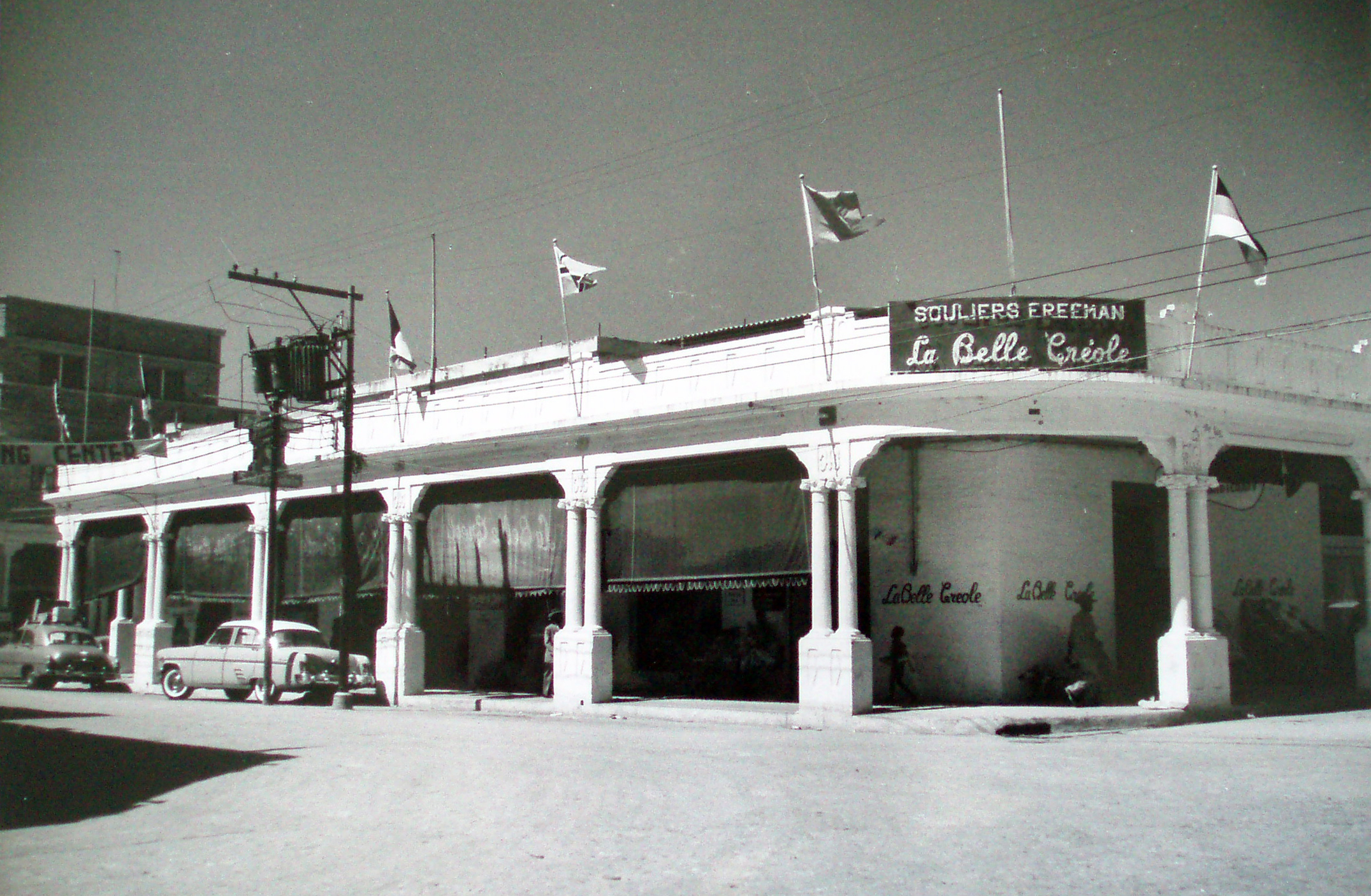
La Belle Créole department store, 1949

In the summer of 1940, El-Saieh returned to Haiti, and worked alongside his mother in her dry goods store Veuve Joseph El-Saieh in downtown Port-au-Prince.

Later, he became president of La Belle Créole – Haiti's first department store – set up by his older brother Elias Noustas in 1948. Located on rue Bonne Foi (then rue Roux), the store expanded throughout the 1950s.

At the time Haiti was booming, and was a popular tourist destination. In December 1951, Elias Noustas opened Le Perchoir, a restaurant, night club and gift-shop designed by architect Max Ewald, located in Boutilliers, overlooking Port-au-Prince.

== Orchestre Saieh (1941–1951) ==
=== The Orchestra ===
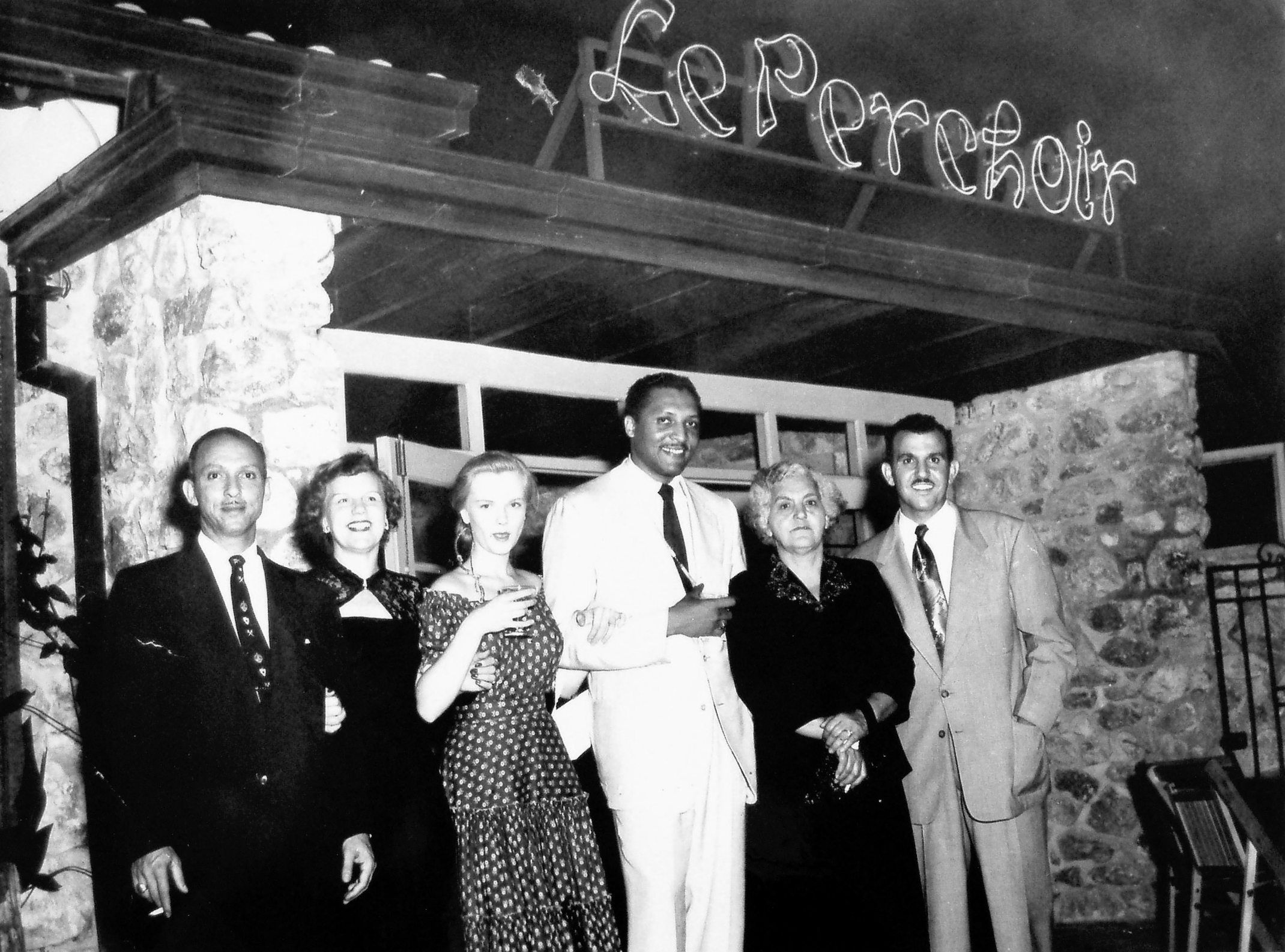
Le Perchoir (from left to right: Elias Noustas and his wife, Betty; guest; guest; Julia Talamas; Issa El-Saieh), 1951

Between 1940 and 1941, in parallel to his business activities, El-Saieh briefly played in Jazz Rouzier (Daniel Rouzier's orchestra) as a clarinet and saxophone player.

In the fall of 1941 and spring of 1942, he began gradually setting up his own ensemble. Known as Issa El-Saieh & His Orchestra, or Orchestre Saieh, the ensemble was heavily structured and composed of a large number of musicians, like an American big band. This would set the orchestra apart from other groups.

Many of the musicians were members of the military orchestra of the National Palace, or came from various bands. Others were still students or had professions. Thus, the orchestra's composition varied through the years.

The band's repertoire merged traditional Haitian music genres – mainly folkloristic songs and melodies as well as voodoo rhythms – with modern jazz, Cuban mambo, meringue and American swing.

In its first few years, Orchestre Saieh played in private houses in Port-au-Prince and the provinces, as well as cinemas and clubs, including the Rex Theater, Ciné Paramount and the Club Miramar. Between 1944 and 1951, the band became regulars at the Club Zanzi Bar and Cabane Choucoune, both located in Pétion-Ville. In the early 1950s, the band frequently played at Le Perchoir in Boutilliers as well as on Ricardo Widmaier's Radio Haiti Sunday morning program called Cocktail Dansant.

El-Saieh retired from the public eye in October 1950, leaving the band in the hands of Ernest "Nono" Lamy, who later renamed the ensemble Nono Lamy & Son Orchestre.

=== Contributors ===
In the early 1940s, El-Saieh often travelled to Cuba, where he met several musicians, including Cuban pianist, composer, arranger and bandleader Ramon "Bebo" Valdés who would become not only a frequent collaborator of the Orchestre Saieh, but also his life-long friend. Valdés wrote and performed the track "Monsieur Saieh", which first featured in the 1959 album Todo Ritmo by Bebo Valdés Y Su Orquesta.

During the late 1940s, in New York City, El-Saieh studied music alongside Eddie Barefield, Andy Brown, Albert J. "Budd" Johnson, and Walter «Foots» Thomas – who had all been members and collaborators of The Cab Calloway Orchestra. He also frequented other musicians such as Dizzy Gillespie, Charlie Parker, Jo Thompson and Kenny Dorham, and was a regular at various jazz and blues night clubs, including Birdland, the Blue Note and Café Society.

El-Saieh ordered original scores from foreign arrangers such as: Bobby Hicks, Albert J. "Budd" Johnson, Pérez Prado and Bebo Valdés, and invited these musicians, as well as American pianist Billy Taylor, to participate in rehearsal sessions as well as recordings with the Orchestre Saieh.

== La Belle Créole – music label (1947–1956) ==
Around 1947, El-Saieh created his own music label, La Belle Créole – which shared the same name of his brother Elias Noustas's department store. From 1947 to 1956, most of Orchestre Saieh's tracks were recorded on this label.

The label also recorded tracks by various bands put together by combinations of musicians from the orchestra, including The Belle Créole Group, La Belle Créole Trio, Bebo Valdés & His Rhythm, Rodolphe Legros & His Ibo Lele Group, Budd Johnson & The Le Perchoir Group, Wébert Sicot & His Cabane Choucoune Ensemble, The Cabane Choucoune Ensemble, Guy Durosier & His Rhythm or Rodolphe Legros & His Ibo Lele Group.

The recordings took place in different locations such as Cabane Choucoune, Radio Commerce or Ricardo Widmaier's Radio Haiti, as well as other locations in Miami, New York City and Havana (mainly at Radio Progreso).

== Galerie Issa (1957–2005) ==
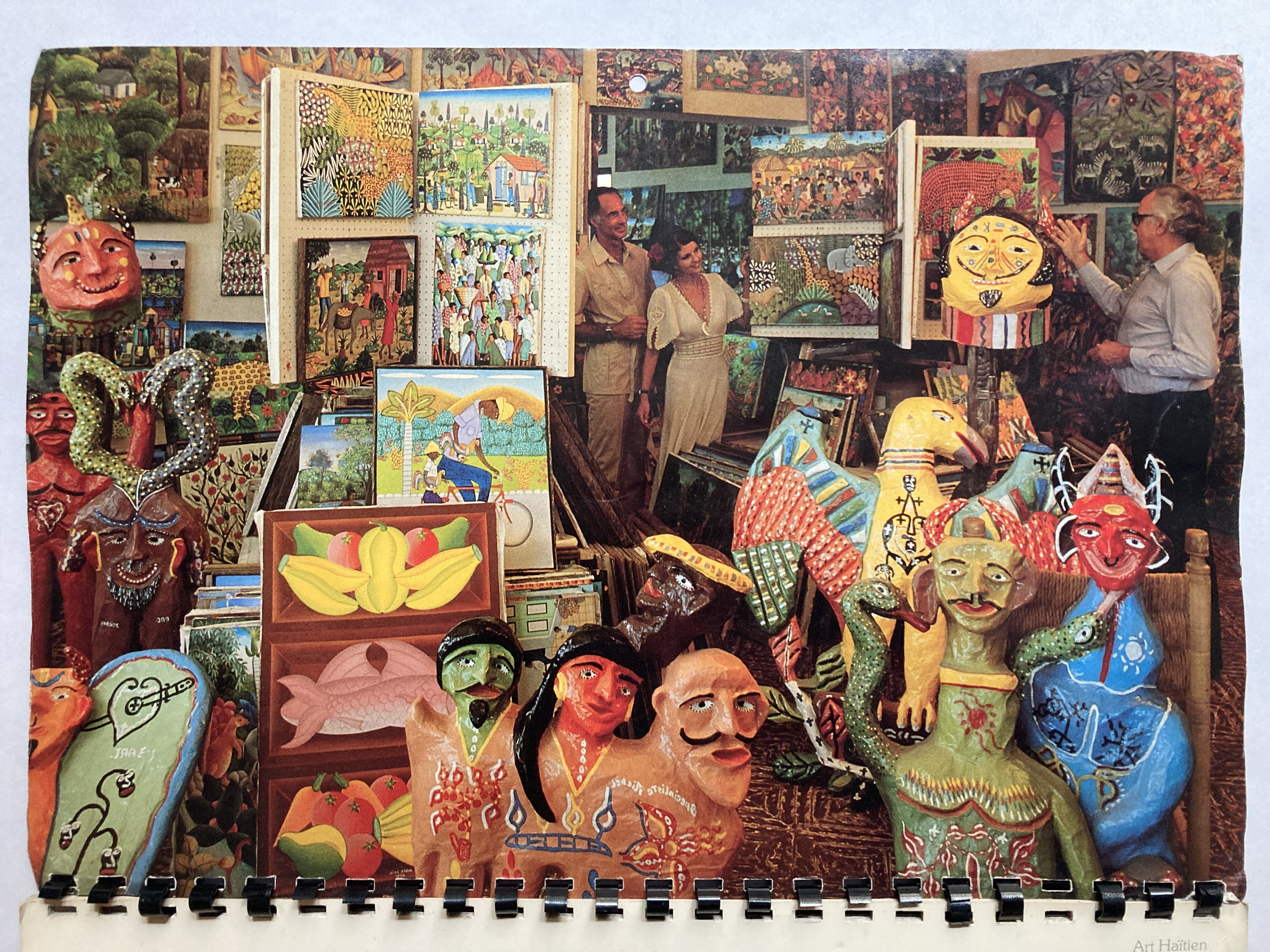
Galerie Issa featured in the 1981 calendar of the Office Nationale du Tourisme et des Relations Publiques of Haiti

In the late 1940s, El-Saieh began buying paintings, and in the mid-1950s, he opened a shop in his brother Elias Noustas's restaurant and night club, Le Perchoir. In 1957, he transferred his shop to rue du Quai in downtown Port-au-Prince, calling it Issa Art Gallery. In 1964, the gallery was moved to his home, where it became known as Galerie Issa.

Artists, including Villard Denis, Néhémy Jean, Jacques Enguerrand Gourgue, Alix Roy and Gesner Armand, worked with him in the gallery's early days, before going on to other ventures. Gradually, the gallery grew in size and in terms of sales.

By the late 1960s and early 1970s, El-Saieh had over fifty artists working with him regularly. Many of them had their ateliers on site, and several remained exclusive to the gallery until El-Saieh's death.

According to the Swedish economist and writer Mats Lundahl:

"Issa played a crucial role in the establishment of a number of the most well-known Haitian naïf painters. He found them, and set them up on regular contracts with his Galerie Issa, providing them with the kind of financial stability that allowed them to concentrate on their painting. The results are to be seen in museums, art galleries, auction houses and private collections all over the world."

Described as an impresario for artists, El-Saieh launched and supported the careers of many Haitian artists, including:

- Gabriel Alix
- Smith and Sisson Blanchard
- Henri and Seymour Bottex
- Jacques Chéry
- Abner Dubic
- Préfète Duffaut
- Roger Françoi
- Yvon Jean-Pierre
- Philton Latortue
- André Normil
- André Pierre
- Fernand Pierre
- Dieudonné Pluviose
- Jerome Polycarp
- Dieudonné Rouanez
- Charles and Audes Saül
- Micius Stephane
- Josaphat Tissaint

Galerie Issa organized and participated in several art exhibitions, particularly in the Caribbean, as well as in other parts of America and Europe. The gallery closed in 2005, following El-Saieh's death.

== Hotel Oloffson ==
In the 1960s, El-Saieh briefly managed the Hotel Oloffson in Port-au-Prince. There, he met English writer Graham Greene, who based the character of Hamit the Syrian on him, in his 1966 novel The Comedians.

== Philanthropy ==
During the course of his life, El-Saieh made regular contributions to orphanages, hospitals and other charitable institutions, mainly in Port-au-Prince. He also supported the Hôpital Albert Schweitzer in Deschapelles and Eye Care-Haiti by regularly donating art works.

== Awards and honors ==
Knight of the Order for Honour and Merit of Haiti ribbon

• March 13, 1959: awarded the title of Knight of the National Order of Honour and Merit (Chevalier de l’Ordre National Honneur et Mérite) by President of the Republic of Haiti, François Duvalier, for his significant contribution to the enrichment of Haitian culture.

- 1998 – honored at New York City's Lincoln Center, by the Haitian American Alliance of New York, as an emblematic figure of Haitian music and one of five giants of Haitian music.
- 2002 – Honor and Merit award from the Caribbean Film Productions – Nuit des Etoiles, for his contribution to Haitian culture.
