= Webert =

Webert is a given name and a surname. Notable people with the name include:

- Webert Sicot (1930–1985), Haitian musician
- Michael Webert (born 1979), American politician
