= Ti Roro =

Haitian drummer

Raymond Baillargau
- Born: Raymond Baillargau; Haiti
- Died: circa 1980; Haiti
- Other names: Ti Roro, Ti Ro Ro, Tiroro
- Occupation: Drummer
- Years active: 1939-1980
- Known for: Afro-Haitian drumming

Baillargau Raymond, known as Ti Roro, was a Haitian drummer known for bringing the artistry of Haitian Vodou ritual drumming and other traditional Afro-Haitian drumming styles to the stage and to recording studios. He was an international performer who influenced jazz musicians, in particular, Max Roach. His year of birth is estimated to be 1915. It is widely believed that he died in 1980, probably in Port-au-Prince.

Ti Roro's performances and collaborations can be found on solo recordings and in work for such artists as orchestra leader Issa El-Saieh, singer Guy Durosier, and dancer Jean-Léon Destiné.

== Discography ==
- 1956: Best Drummer in Haiti (Cook Road Recordings)
- 1957: Hi-Fi Haitian Drums, with Issa El-Saieh (Capitol of the World)
- 1958: Ti-Roro/Ti-Marcel: Voodoo Drums in Hi-Fi (Atlantic)
- 1971: Ti RoRo et ses Tambours Vaudou (Request/Sounds of the Caribbean3)
- 1973: Ti Roro et son Tambour (Ibo/Macaya)
- 1977: Various: Caribbean Dance Party (Gateway)
- 1979: Roots of Haiti Vol. 4 (Mini Records)
- 2004: The Best of Ti Roro (Rice)
- Year unknown: Voodoo Drums of Ti RoRo (Monogram)
- Year unknown: Murat Pierre And His Orchestra Featuring Ti Roro - A Night In Port-Au-Prince (Palace Record)
