= André Normil =

Haitian painter (1934–2014)

- Born: September 26, 1934; Port-au-Prince, Haiti
- Died: May 2, 2014 (aged 79); Port-au-Prince, Haiti
- Known for: Painting

André Normil (September 26, 1934–May 2, 2014) was a Haitian painter.

== Career ==
Normil was a self-taught artist. He decorated tap-tap (shared taxis) before joining the Centre d'Art in 1951. In 1956, Haitian painter Jacques-Enguerrand Gourgue introduced Normil to a gallery owner named Issa El-Saieh. Thereafter, Normil worked exclusively for the Galerie Issa, where he had his own studio until the death of the gallery's founder in 2005.

== Works ==
His works provide a detailed and nuanced portrayal of everyday urban life in Haiti. Subjects of his work include schoolchildren, street vendors, cockfights, and rara musicians. The themes in his paintings are drawn from a range of inspirations, including history, country weddings, and scenes from the Bible.

Normil's compositions are elaborate and feature numerous characters, activities, and bright colors, often with an element of humor. He was initially classified as a humorous painter before later being regarded as a "master of Haitian painting".

== Legacy ==
His works have been presented in various exhibitions, galleries and museums, mainly in the Caribbean, Latin America, the United States, and Europe. He is included in the collections of the Haitian Art Museum of Saint Pierre College in Port-au-Prince, and the Milwaukee Art Museum. Many of his paintings have also been used as a tool for tourism and cultural promotion by the Haitian Ministry of Tourism.
