= Alix (disambiguation) =

Alix is a Franco-Belgian comics series.

Alix may also refer to:

== Places ==
- Alix, Alberta, Canada, a village
- Alix, Rhône, France, a commune
- Alix, Arkansas, United States, an unincorporated community

== People ==
- Alix (given name), a unisex given name
- Alix (surname), a surname
- Alexandra of Denmark (1844–1925), nicknamed "Alix"
- Alexandra Feodorovna (Alix of Hesse) (1872–1918), empress consort of Nicholas II of Russia

== See also ==
- Əlix, Azerbaijan, a village
- Alex (disambiguation)
