= Monferrier Dorval =

Haitian lawyer (1956–2020)

Ordre des Avocats de Port-au-Prince

Personal details
- Born: June 10, 1956 Grande-Saline, Haiti
- Died: 28 August 2020 (aged 64) Pétion-Ville, Haiti
- Cause of death: Assassination by shooting

Monferrier Dorval (June 10, 1956 – August 28, 2020), was a Haitian lawyer who was the president of the Ordre des Avocats de Port-au-Prince ("order of the lawyers").

He was shot dead in his private residence on August 28, 2020 at age 64.

== Early life and education ==
Monferrier Dorval was born on June 10, 1956 in Grande-Saline, Artibonite department. He left his home town in 1969 after completing his primary education. He subsequently attended Lycée Alexandre Pétion where he completed his secondary studies in 1976. In the process, he was admitted to the Faculty of Human Sciences of the State University of Haiti where he followed a course in social work until 1980. In 1981, he joined as a student the Faculty of Law and Economics (FDSE) of the State University of Haiti.

Winner of a competition organized by the French Embassy in Haiti, Dorval was the recipient of one of two masters scholarships available under an agreement between the FDSE and the University of Aix-Marseille. He went to study in France, at the Faculty of Law and Political Science of Aix-Marseille, where he presented his doctoral thesis on the Haitian public administration on July 8, 1992, and returned to Haiti in 1993.

From November 1993, he began teaching constitutional and administrative law at Quisqueya University. In January 1994, he joined the faculty of the Faculty of Law and Economics of the UEH.

== Political career ==
Back in Haiti, he was sworn in as a lawyer at the Ordre des Avocats de Port-au-Prince in 1993 and began his career as a lawyer with the law firm Lamarre. He opened his own firm, Dorval, on January 3, 2000. In 2015, he was elected to the Council of the Port-au-Prince Bar Association. In the process, he was appointed president of the scientific commission of the first Bar of the Caribbean. In December 2017, he chaired the Organizing Committee of the 32nd Congress of the International Conference of Bars (CIB) in Haiti and of the International Union of Lawyers (UIA) seminar held in Decameron in May 2019. On February 6, 2020, he won the Port-au-Prince bar elections, with 228 votes against his opponents Patrick Laurent (146 votes) and Jacquenet Oxilus (132 votes).

== Death ==
Dorval was shot multiple times in his home on August 28, 2020. He was pronounced dead at the scene. He was buried privately at Parc du Souvenir in Port-au-Prince on September 17, 2020.

According to the investigation report of the Central Directorate of Judicial Police, the "named Modelet Sénégeau alias Abidy, Mackender Fils-Aimé, Dunès Vilpique alias Jah, Markenson Charles alias Cobra, Gerson Laurent alias TiLuc or Louko, Richelet Augustin, Johny Toussaint and others, joined together as criminals to assassinate citizen Monferrier Dorval, President of the Ordre des Avocats de Port-au-Prince".

== Legacy ==
The "Monferrier Dorval Award of Excellence" was created by the Executive Council of the State University of Haiti following a resolution adopted on September 15, 2020. "The prize will be awarded each year to the student who succeeds in writing the best bachelor's thesis, the best master's thesis and the best thesis in law."

On September 18, 2020, Quisqueya University paid tribute to Bâtonnier Monferrier Dorval in the presence of several professors including former ministers and other political figures.

The Council of the Paris Bar Association adopted a motion in honor of the memory of Monferrier Dorval on September 1, 2020, and awarded him the posthumous title of honorary member and met on September 18 to pay him a final tribute. On this occasion, Olivier Cousi, the President of the Bar of Paris pronounced, "We are not only paying tribute to a friend who left too early but to a defender of rights and freedoms."
