= Jean-Claude Castera =

Haitian painter

Jean-Claude Castera (born 1939) is a Haitian painter born in Pétion-Ville, a wealthy suburb of Port-au-Prince. Castera was educated in San Juan, Puerto Rico. He typically paints abstract scenes and women.
