= Biguine =

Martinique dance and music style

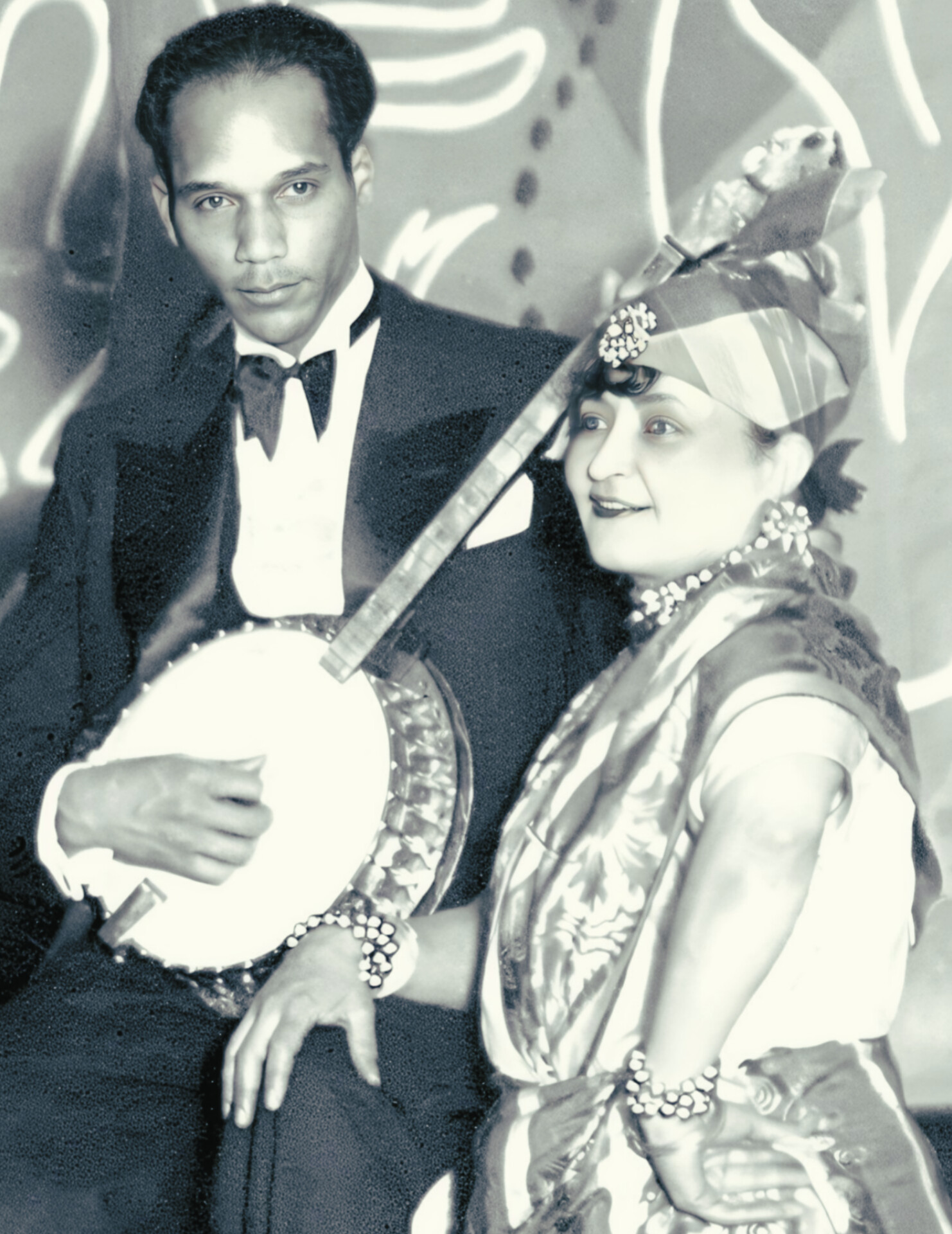
- The famous Biguine vocalist Léona Gabriel with the banjoist Henri Boye
- Stylistic origins: Bélé; Polka; Ballroom dance
- Cultural origins: Late 1890s, Saint-Pierre, Martinique
- Typical instruments: Voice; Accordion; Violin; Clarinet; Trombone; Trumpet; Saxophone; Banjo; Double bass; Drums; Maracas; Claves
- Derivative forms: Biguine vidé

Subgenres
- Biguine wabap; Biguine ka

Fusion genres
- Zouk

Other topics
- Rumba; Jazz; Calypso; Beguine; Martinique; Guadeloupe

Biguine (/bɪˈɡɪn/ big-IN, French: [biɡin]; Antillean Creole: bigin) is a rhythmic dance and music style that originated from Saint-Pierre, Martinique in the 19th century. It fuses West African traditional music genres, such as bélé, with 19th-century French ballroom dance steps.

== History ==
Two main types of French antillean biguine can be identified based on the instrumentation in contemporary musical practice, called the drum biguine and the orchestrated biguine. Each of these refers to characteristics of a specific origin. The drum biguine, or bidgin bèlè in Creole, comes from a series of bèlè dances performed since early colonial times by the slaves who inhabited the great sugar plantations. Musically, the bidgin bèlè can be distinguished from the orchestrated biguine in the following ways: its instrumentation (cylindrical single-membraned drum (bèlè) and the rhythm sticks (tibwa); the call-and-response singing style; the soloist's improvisation, and the nasal voice quality. According to a study by Rosemain (1988), the biguine figured in fertility rituals practiced in West Africa, but its ritual significance has since disappeared in Martinique.

=== Drum biguine, or bidgin bélé ===
Bidgin bèlè originates in slave bèlè dances and is characterized by the use of bèlè drums and tibwa rhythm sticks, along with call and response, nasal vocals and improvised instrumental solos. It has its roots in West African dances.

The bèlè is also the name of medium size tambour drum. Players sit astride the drum. It is characterized, in its rhythm, by the "tibwa" (two wooden sticks) played either on a length of bamboo mounted on a stand or on the sides of the tambour bèlè. Added to the tambour bèlè and tibwa are the maracas, more commonly referred to as the chacha. The cinquillo-tresillo is beat out by the tibwa, but it translates very well to the chacha when the rhythms are applied for playing biguine. The tibwa rhythm plays a basic pattern and the drum comes to mark the highlights and introduce percussion improvisations.

=== Orchestrated biguine ===
By combining the traditional bèlè music with the European dance genres, the black musicians of Martinique created the biguine, which comprises three distinct styles:

- the biguine de salon
- the biguine de bal
- the biguine de rue.

In the 1930s several biguine artists from Martinique and Guadeloupe moved to France, where they achieved great popularity in Paris, especially in the wake of the colonial exhibition in 1931. Early stars like Alexandre Stellio and Sam Castandet became popular in Paris. Between the 1930s and 1950s, the dance biguine was popular among the islands' dance orchestras. Its popularity abroad died relatively quickly, but it lasted as a major force in popular music in Martinique and Guadeloupe until Haitian Cadence and Compas music took over in the 1950s. In the later part of the 20th century, biguine musicians like clarinet virtuoso Michel Godzom helped revolutionize the genre.

=== Biguine and jazz of Louisiana ===
Biguine is one of the ancestors of the musical genre jazz that was created by the Creoles of New Orleans, Louisiana.

== Evolution of biguine ==
The signature sound of the biguine is the interplay between the clarinet and trombone, both solo and as a duet, which can still be heard today throughout Antilles' music, from the most traditional forms like cadence or the pop sounds of today's Zouk.

=== Biguine vidé ===
Biguine vidé is an up tempo version of the biguine rhythm (tambour and tibwa), combining other carnival elements. It is a form of participatory music from Guadeloupe and Martinique, with the bandleader singing a verse and the audience responding. Modern instrumentation includes a variety of improvised drums made from containers of all kinds, plastic plumbing, bells, tanbou débonda, chacha bèlè, tibwa and bèlè drums. The fast pace of the carnival-associated biguine provided the rhythmic basis for zouk béton ("hard" zouk), which is reserved for individual jump up.

== Selected recordings ==
- Celestin roi diable – Alexandre Kindou (1932)
- Oué oué oué oué – Alexandre Stellio (1931)

== See also ==
- Beguine (dance)
- Habanera
- Culture of Martinique
- Music of Martinique
