= Festival du Rhum Haiti =

- Frequency: Annual
- Locations: Pétion-Ville, Haiti
- Inaugurated: 2014
- Website: www.lefestivaldurhum-haiti.com

The Festival du Rhum Haiti (English: Haiti Rum Festival) is an international festival promoting rum and related alcoholic beverages organized by J'Organise; collaborated and held in the El Rancho Hotel in Pétion-Ville, Haiti. The three-day event premiered 14 November 2014.

Awards such as Gold, Silver and Bronze medals are awarded to best amateurs and professionals of rum and cocktails and even chefs for cooking demonstrations from the best around the world. At the closing ceremony of the event, includes artistic performances, and a fashion show.

== See also ==
- Rhum agricole
