= Conjunto International =

Haitian compas band

Conjunto International was a seminal compas band from Haiti formed in 1955 by saxophone players Nemours Jean-Baptiste and Weber Sicot. Initial band members included Anulis Cadet, brothers Kreutzer and Mozart Duroseau, Monfort Jean-Baptiste, and Julien Paul. Kreutzer Duroseau originally came up with the name compa direct, but because Nemours was maestro of the band, he took all the credit for himself. Kreutzer was the best tambour (conga) player in Haiti.

The band's music was popular among the higher classes of Haiti, reportedly including the family of François Duvalier.

In 1956, Sicot left the band to form another compas band, Latino. That same year, Nemours would rename Conjunto International as Ensemble Aux Callebasses, and later as Ensemble Nemours Jean-Baptiste.
