= Hôtel Montana =

Hotel in Haiti

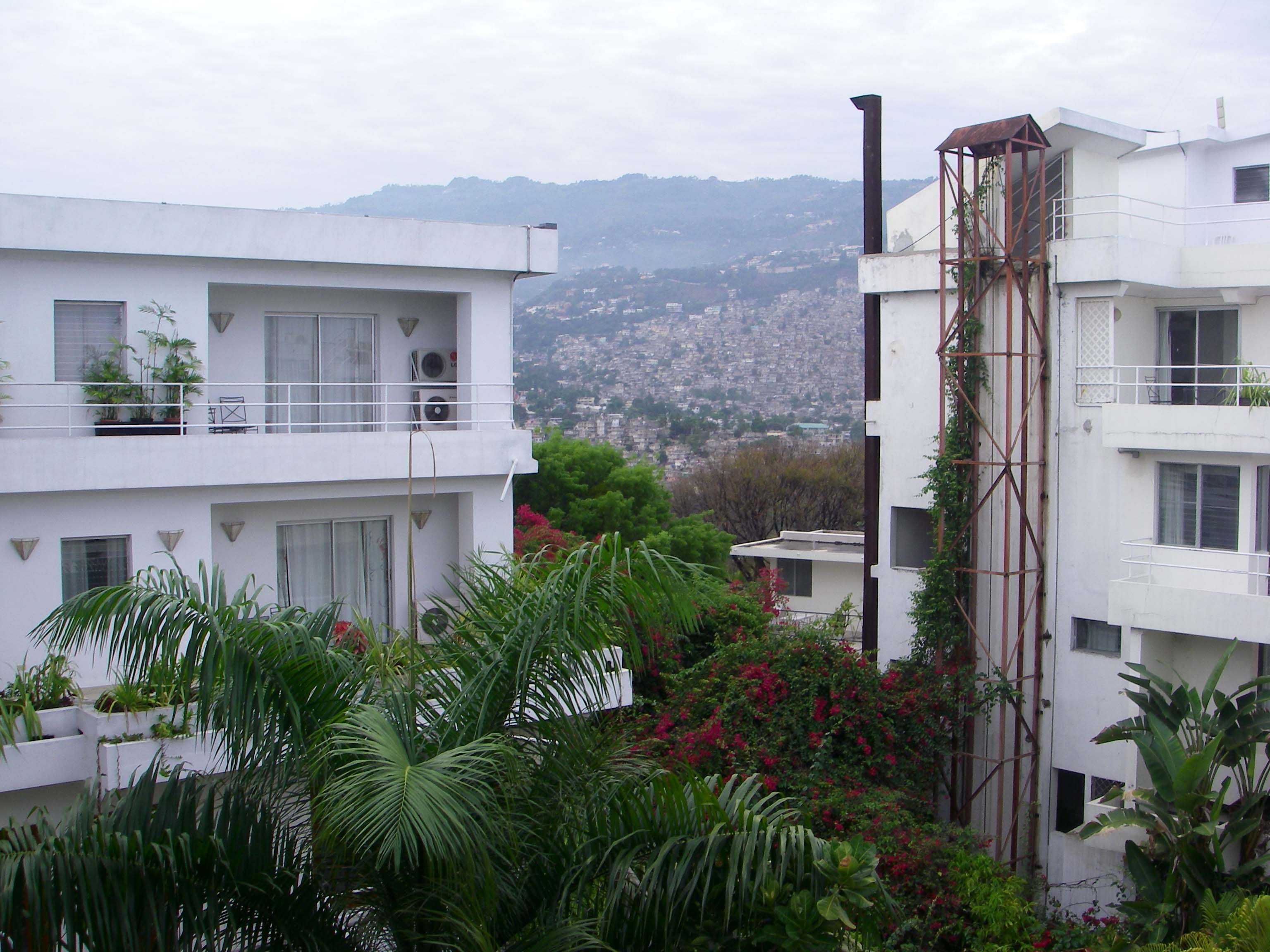
- Hôtel Montana in 2007

- Location within Haiti

General information
- Location: Pétion-Ville, Haiti
- Coordinates: 18°31′38″N 72°17′52″W
- Opening: 1947

Other information
- Number of rooms: 60
- Number of restaurants: 1

Website
- www.hotelmontanahaiti.com

The Hôtel Montana is a four star luxury hotel in Haiti. It is located on Rue Frank Cardozo, Bourdon on one of the only three main roads connecting the capital to its southeastern outskirt city Pétion-Ville.

It was one of the most luxurious hotels in Haiti until it was destroyed by the 2010 Haiti earthquake. It opened in 1947 and remained a family-owned institution. It welcomed international personalities (heads of State, ministers, diplomats, famous actors and businessmen).

== History ==
=== Hotel Beau-Site ===
The hotel was built in 1947 on the plans of the architect Franck Cardozo and inaugurated on the occasion of the bicentenary of the foundation of the city of Port-au-Prince. The establishment was then called the "Hotel Beau-Site" (English translation "Beautiful Site Hotel") and stood on the hillside, rue Franck Cardozo. It offered 12 rooms with views of the Haitian capital and the bay that opens off onto the Caribbean Sea.

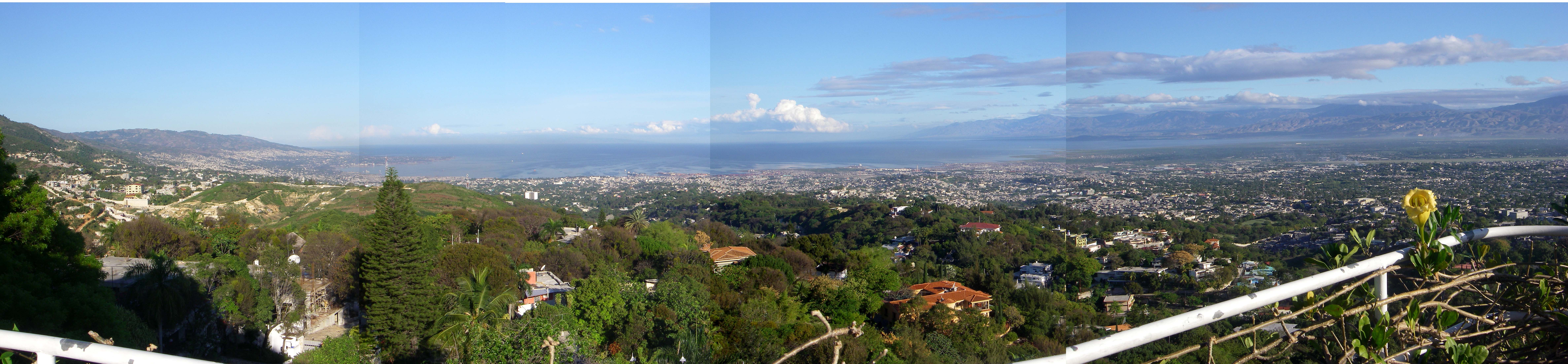
View from Hotel Montana Haiti

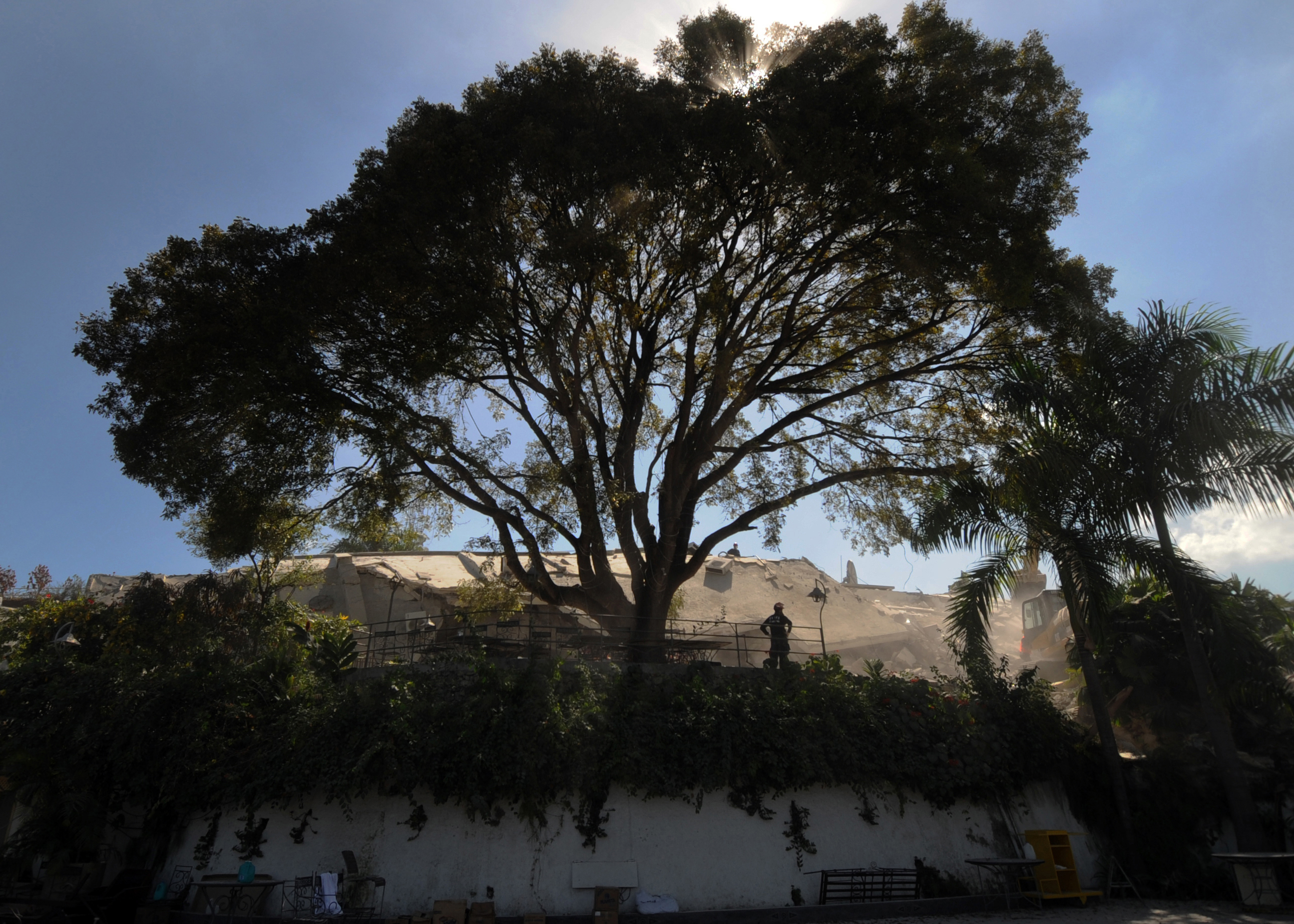
Centenarian Mahogany tree at Hotel Montana

=== Hôtel Montana ===
Subsequently, the hotel's popularity grew and its installations followed suit. By 2005 the building stood on seven floors and had 145 rooms. By 2009, the hotel had a swimming pool, shops, eight conference rooms and a small chapel.

The flagship of hotels of Haiti, it was classified four-star hotel. The hotel accommodated the international jet-set as well as politicians and businessmen from around the world. The former US President Bill Clinton, the Governor General of Canada, Michaëlle Jean, and the actor Brad Pitt had stayed there among others.

On 12 January 2010, at 4:53 pm, a 7.0M earthquake shook Haiti. The 45-second shock-wave caused the collapse of the hotel and many other landmarks. The government of Haiti estimated that 250,000 residences and 30,000 commercial buildings had collapsed or were severely damaged. In just a few minutes, the hotel became a heap of white stone and twisted steel wires causing an estimated 200 of 300 guests to be reported missing the day after the collapse.

The hotel donated what could be salvaged from its freezers to restaurant Muncheez, which was at the time working as a community soup kitchen, serving free meals.

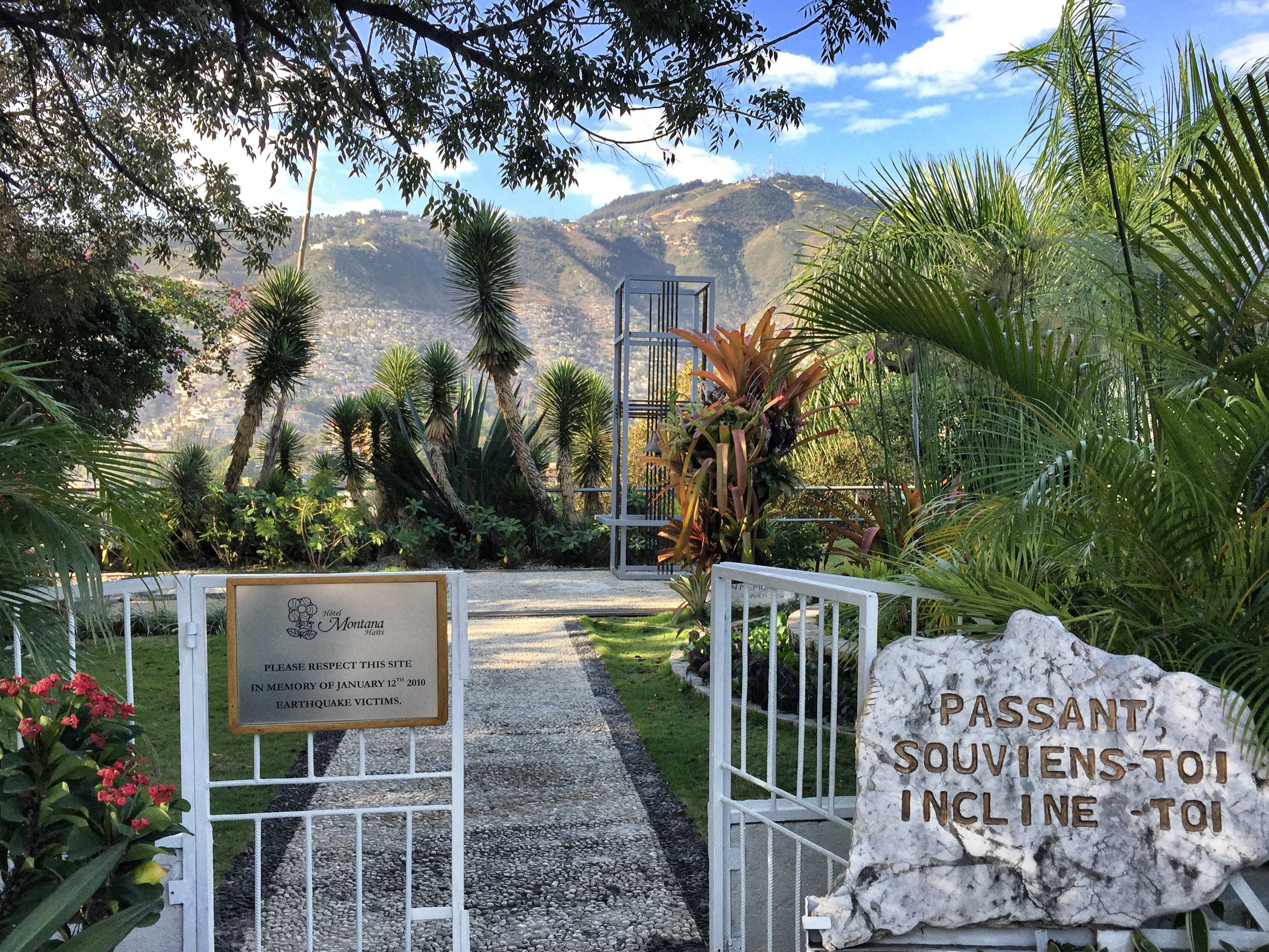
Memorial Garden

The complete demolition of hotel buildings still rising among the ruins began on 28 January, 2010. With the encouragements of staff and guests, the hotel's reconstruction was set in motion. As of April 2011, the hotel underwent reconstruction, with the bar, pool, restaurant and some rooms already being open to guests.

The hotel dedicated a quiet garden on-site for those who were victims of the tragic earthquake. Fifty-two people lost their lives, including a seven-year-old member of the owners' family. Every year, a mass is held on the memorial in remembrance of the victims of the tragedy.

The hotel reopened with eight rooms, but eventually added dozens more.
