= Abner Dubic =

Haitian painter

- Born: 1944 (age 81–82); Léogane, Haiti
- Known for: Painting

Abner Dubic (born November, 1944 or 1948 according to source) is a Haitian painter.

== Biography ==
Originally from Léogane, Dubic came to live in Port-au-Prince at a young age. He began painting in 1966, encouraged by the artist Gabriel Lévêque (1923-2013) from Croix-des-Bouquets. A few years later, he joined the studios of the Galerie Issa, with whom he worked exclusively until the death of its founder, Issa El-Saieh, in 2005.

Self-taught, he developed his own style, choosing to mainly represent the Haitian countryside, its landscapes, it's rural life and typical architecture.

In 1975, under the patronage of André Malraux and Jean-Marie Drot, an exhibition of Dubic's works was organized in Paris and Auxerre.

His paintings have been presented in numerous exhibitions and galleries, mainly in the Caribbean, New York, Boca Raton, Chicago, Mexico, Paris, or Strasbourg and are part of several important collections of Haitian painting.
