= Alix (surname) =

Alix is a surname. Notable people with the surname include:

- Adolfo Alix Jr. (born 1978), Filipino screenwriter
- Anthony Alix (born 1986), professional Canadian football placekicker and punter for the BC Lions
- Franklin DeWayne Alix (1975–2010), American serial killer
- Gabriel Alix (1930–1998), Haitian painter
- May Alix (1902–1983), American jazz vocalist
- Pierre-Michel Alix (1762–1817), French engraver
- Alberto García-Alix (1956-) Spanish photographer of La Movida Madrileña
- Antonio García-Alix (1852–1911), Spanish Attorney and Politician, Minister for Public Instruction and Fine Arts, then for Finance, Government.
- José Alix-Alix (1912–1988), Spanish Physician, specializing in Tuberculosis therapy from the pre-antibiotic era, pioneer of Thoracic Surgery.
