= Audes Saül =

Haitian painter (born 1949

- Born: 25 May 1949 (age 76); Bombardopolis, Haiti
- Known for: painting
- Style: naive

Audes Saül (born 25 May 1949) is a Haitian painter.

== Biography ==
Saül was born in Bombardopolis, in the Northwest of Haiti.

Prior to his artistic career, Saül worked as a laborer, carpenter and electrician.

Self-taught, he began painting full-time at the age of 21, influenced by his older brother, Charles (born 1943), who had taken up painting a few years prior.

In 1971, Charles joined the Galerie Issa in Port-au-Prince. Shortly after, Audes followed suit, and worked exclusively for the gallery until the death of its founder, Issa El-Saieh, in 2005.

Audes began by painting rural, sometimes mystical scenes, but quickly discovered his favorite subject and his own style. In bright colors, surrounded by vegetation, fruits, and vegetables, he paints dogs – where others would depict humans – at the beach, on boats, or in wedding attire. He also paints still lives and other subjects, infusing them with humor and optimism.

In 1975, several of his paintings were selected by André Malraux and Jean-Marie Drot for exhibitions in France – these paintings were reproduced in Vogue magazine at the time.

His works have been presented in numerous exhibitions and galleries, particularly in the Caribbean, Mexico, the United States, Sweden, Italy, France, and Japan.
