= Wabap =

Antillean music style

- Stylistic origins: Bebop; Afro-Cuban jazz; traditional biguine
- Cultural origins: Guadeloupe, French Caribbean, c. 1950
- Typical instruments: Trombone; trumpet; saxophone; piano; bass guitar; guitar; drums

Fusion genres
- Zouk

Audio sample
- "Aimer" by Moune de Rivel featuring Al Lirvat et son Orchestre: file; help

Wabap (or simply biguine wabap) is a subgenre of biguine, a Caribbean music style.

== Etymology ==
The name derives from the traditional refrain wiz-zap wabap sung by sugarcane cutters.

== History ==
According to Al Lirvat, the term was coined by Nelly Lunflas, a revue leader at La Canne à Sucre. The first wabap recordings were made in 1952 by Al Lirvat and Robert Mavounzy. In 1954, a piece by Lirvat sung by Moune de Rivel was titled "Biguine Wabap".

== Musical characteristics ==
Wabap incorporates into biguine a number of assonances and dissonances, altered chords, and complex rhythms in five, six, and seven beats. Banjo disappeared in wabap and it was replaced by guitar.
