= Mats Lundahl =

Swedish economist, and a tenured professor at the Stockholm School of Economics

Mats Lundahl (born 11 May 1946) is a Swedish economist, and a tenured professor at the Stockholm School of Economics.

His specialties are foreign aid and development economics.
