= Nemours Jean-Baptiste =

Haitian saxophonist

- Also known as: Maestro
- Born: February 2, 1918; Port-au-Prince, Haiti
- Died: May 1985 (aged 66–67) Haiti
- Genres: Compas
- Occupations: Instrumentalist, composer, band leader
- Instrument: Saxophone

Nemours Jean-Baptiste (February 2, 1918 – May 18, 1985) was a Haitian saxophonist, writer, and band leader. He is credited with being the inventor of Konpa, also known as Konpa direct, a style of Haitian music.

Nemours nicknamed "maestro" married Marie-Félicité Olivier with whom he had two daughters, Yvrose, Marie-Denise and a son, Yves-Nemours.

In 1955, he founded the Ensemble Aux Callebasses which popularized his invention of Konpa. Nemours dedicated many songs to his friends and fans. The 1967 composition "Ti Carole", dedicated to his fan Kouri, became famous and is still a favorite.

In the early sixties, many of the Group Konpa Direct's compositions were in praise of women and healthy relationships "Ti Carole" was one of the famous hit that remains amongst the Top ten list for over a year. Nemours and the Group performed at several New York night club in the early seventies.

== Rivalry with Webert Sicot ==
During Jean-Baptiste's early career, he played in a band with fellow Haitian artist Webert Sicot called Conjunto International. Years after the band dissolved, Webert Sicot introduced a new dance rhythm that bore many similarities to Jean-Baptiste's compas. During the period of argument and controversy that followed, the two took lyrical jabs at each other in their songs. The competition between the two culminated in a soccer match between the two artists and their respective bands, which ended in a 1–1 tie.

== See also ==
- Cabane Choucoune
- Conjunto International
