= Bebop =

Subgenre of jazz music developed in the U.S. in mid-1940s

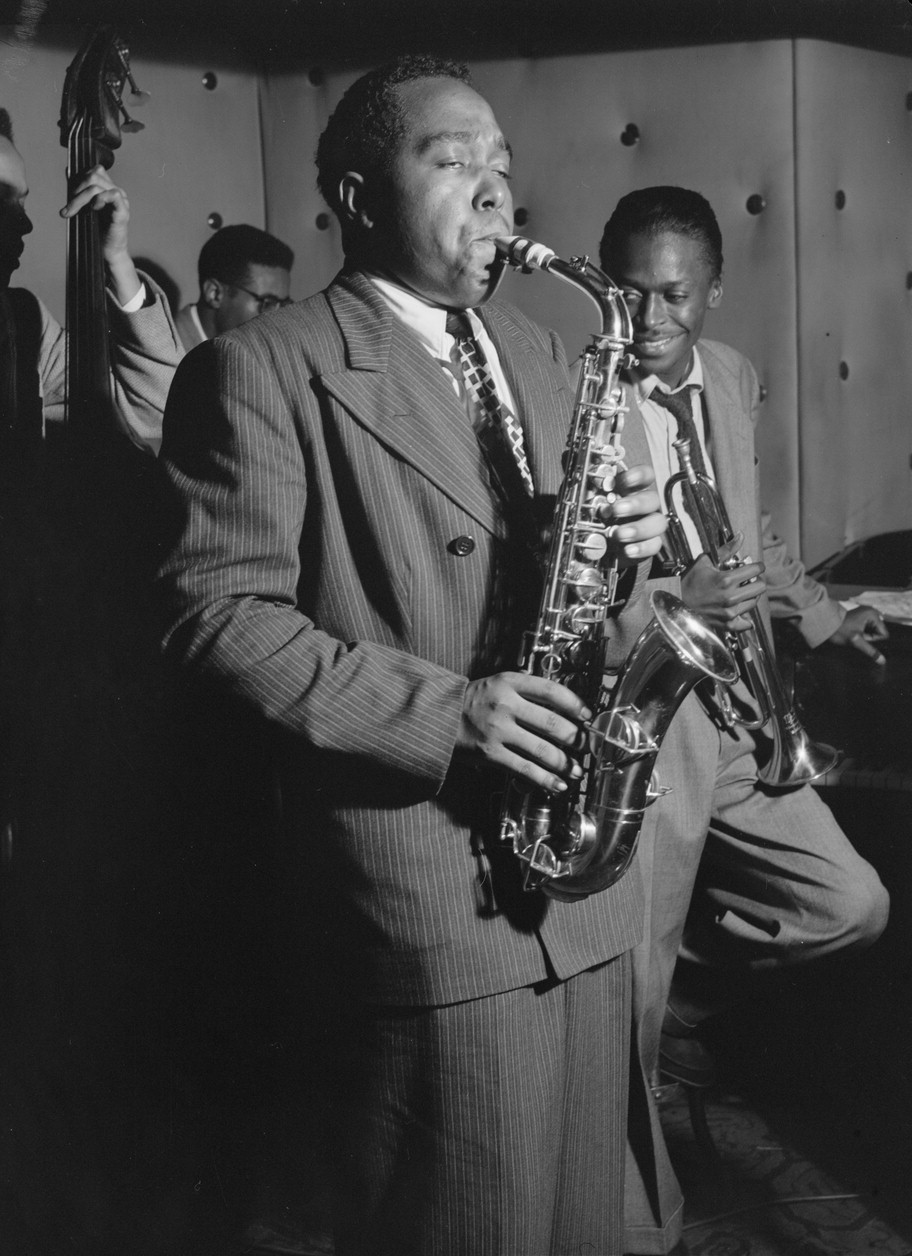
- Alto saxophonist Charlie Parker was a leading performer and composer of the bebop era. He is pictured here with Tommy Potter, Max Roach and Miles Davis at the Three Deuces club in New York City.
- Stylistic origins: Swing; Kansas City jazz
- Cultural origins: Mid-1940s, United States
- Derivative forms: Avant-garde jazz; hard bop; post-bop; wabap

Regional scenes
- United States

Other topics
- Jazz piano; Progressive music; Hipster (1940s subculture)

Bebop or bop is a style of jazz developed in the early to mid-1940s in the United States. It is characterized by a fast tempo, complex chord progressions—with rapid chord changes, changes of key, angular melodies and substitute chords, along with virtuosic improvisation based on a combination of harmonic structure, scales, and occasional references to the melody.

Bebop developed as the younger generation of jazz musicians expanded the creative possibilities of jazz beyond the popular, dance-oriented swing music-style to a new "musician's music" that was not as danceable and demanded close listening. As bebop was not intended for dancing, it enabled the musicians to play at faster tempos. Bebop musicians explored advanced harmonies, complex syncopation, altered chords, extended chords, chord substitutions, asymmetrical phrasing, and intricate melodies. Bebop groups used rhythm sections in a way that expanded their role. Whereas the key ensemble of the swing music era was the big band of 16–18 musicians playing in an ensemble-based style, the classic bebop group was a small combo that consisted of saxophone (alto or tenor), trumpet, piano, guitar, double bass, and drums playing music in which the ensemble played a supportive role for soloists. Rather than play heavily arranged music, bebop musicians typically played the melody of a composition (called the "head") with the accompaniment of the rhythm section, followed by a section in which each of the performers improvised a solo, then returned to the melody at the end of the composition.

Some of the most influential bebop artists, who were typically composer-performers, are alto sax players Charlie Parker and Sonny Stitt; tenor sax players Dexter Gordon, Sonny Rollins, and James Moody; clarinet player Buddy DeFranco; trumpeters Fats Navarro, Miles Davis, and Dizzy Gillespie; pianists Bud Powell, Barry Harris and Thelonious Monk; trombonist J.J. Johnson; electric guitarist Charlie Christian; and drummers Kenny Clarke, Max Roach, and Art Blakey.

== Etymology ==
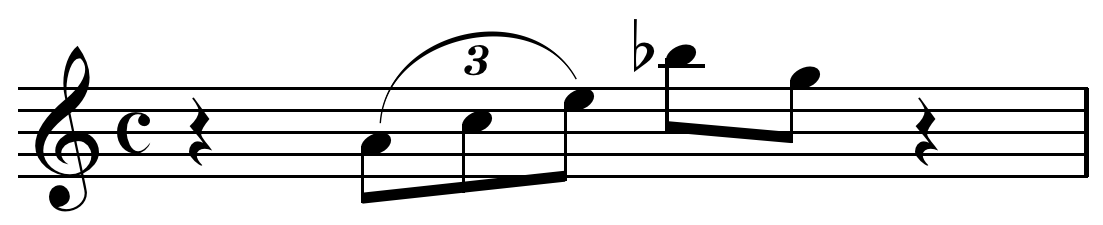
"In spite of the explanations of the origins of these words, players actually did sing the words 'bebop' and 'rebop' to an early bop phrase as shown in the following example."

The term "bebop" is derived from nonsense syllables (vocables) used in scat singing; the first known example of "bebop" being used was in McKinney's Cotton Pickers' "Four or Five Times", recorded in 1928. It appears again in a 1936 recording of "I'se a Muggin'" by Jack Teagarden. A variation, "rebop", appears in several 1939 recordings. The first known print appearance also occurred in 1939, but the term was little used subsequently until applied to the music now associated with it in the mid-1940s. Thelonious Monk has claimed that "Bip Bop", the original title for his composition better known as "52nd Street Theme", was the origin of the name "bebop".

Some researchers speculate that it was a term used by Charlie Christian because it sounded like something he hummed along with his playing. Dizzy Gillespie stated that the audiences coined the name after hearing him scat the then-nameless compositions to his players, and the press ultimately picked it up, using it as an official term: "People, when they'd wanna ask for those numbers and didn't know the name, would ask for bebop." Another theory is that it derives from the cry of "Arriba! Arriba!" used by Latin American bandleaders of the period to encourage their bands. At times, the terms "bebop" and "rebop" were used interchangeably (although rebop differed from bebop with its more impressionist use of discordant chords). By 1945, the use of "bebop"/"rebop" as nonsense syllables was widespread in R&B music, such as Lionel Hampton's "Hey! Ba-Ba-Re-Bop". The bebop musician or bopper became a stock character in jokes during the 1950s, overlapping with the beatnik.

== Instrumentation ==
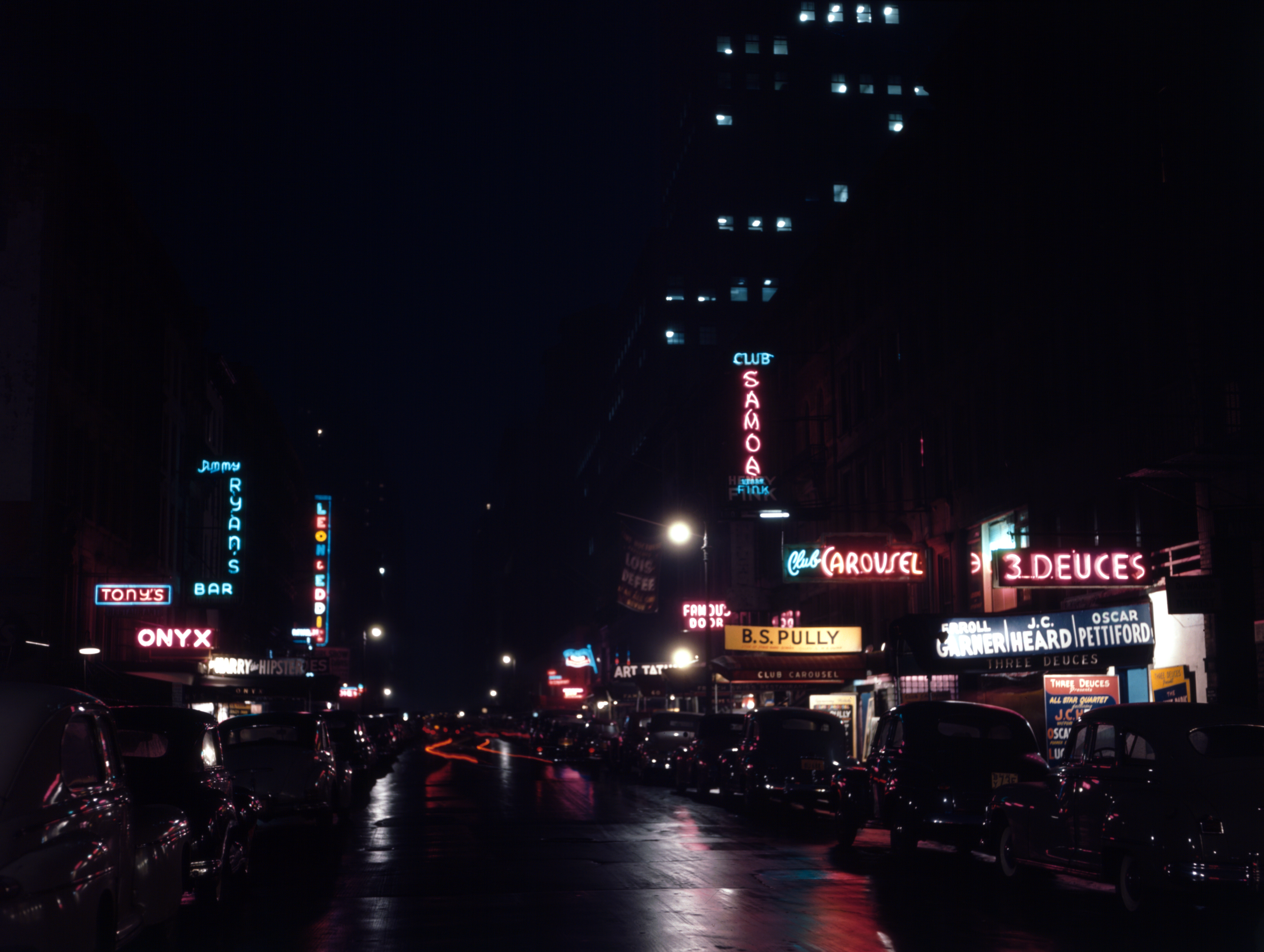
Several bebop musicians headlining on 52nd Street, 1948

The classic bebop combo consisted of saxophone, trumpet, double bass, drums and piano. This was a format used (and popularized) by both Parker (alto sax) and Gillespie (trumpet) in their 1940s groups and recordings, sometimes augmented by an extra saxophonist or guitar (electric or acoustic), occasionally adding other horns (often a trombone) or other strings (usually violin) or dropping an instrument and leaving only a quartet. This was in stark contrast to the large ensembles favored during the swing era.

== Musical style ==
Bebop differed drastically from the straightforward compositions of the swing era and was instead characterized by fast tempos, asymmetrical phrasing, intricate melodies, and rhythm sections that expanded on their role as tempo-keepers. The music itself seemed jarringly different to the ears of the public, who were used to the bouncy, organized, danceable compositions of Benny Goodman and Glenn Miller during the swing era. Instead, bebop appeared to sound racing, nervous, erratic and often fragmented.

"Bebop" was a label that certain journalists later gave it, but we never labeled the music. It was just modern music, we would call it. We wouldn't call it anything, really, just music.

— Kenny Clarke

While swing music tended to feature orchestrated big band arrangements, bebop music highlighted improvisation. Typically, a theme (a "head", often the main melody of a pop or jazz standard of the swing era) would be presented together at the beginning and the end of each piece, with improvisational solos based on the chords of the compositions. Thus, the majority of a piece in bebop style would be improvisation, the only threads holding the work together being the underlying harmonies played by the rhythm section. Sometimes improvisation included references to the original melody or to other well-known melodic lines ("quotes", "licks", or "riffs"). Sometimes they were entirely original, spontaneous melodies from start to finish.

Chord progressions for bebop compositions were often taken directly from popular swing-era compositions and reused with a new and more complex melody, forming new compositions (see contrafact). This practice was already well-established in earlier jazz, but came to be central to the bebop style. The style made use of several relatively common chord progressions, such as blues (at base, I-IV-V, but infused with II-V motion) and "rhythm changes" (I-VI-II-V, the chords to the 1930s pop standard "I Got Rhythm"). Late bop also moved towards extended forms that represented a departure from pop and show compositions. Bebop chord voicings often dispensed with the root and fifth tones, instead basing them on the leading intervals that defined the tonality of the chord. This opened up creative possibilities for harmonic improvisation, such as tritone substitutions and use of diminished scale-based improvised lines that could resolve to the key center in numerous, surprising ways.

Bebop musicians also employed several harmonic devices not typical of previous jazz. Complicated harmonic substitutions for more basic chords became commonplace. These substitutions often emphasized certain dissonant intervals such as the flat ninth, sharp ninth or the sharp eleventh/tritone. This unprecedented harmonic development which took place in bebop is often traced back to a transcendent moment experienced by Charlie Parker while performing "Cherokee" at Clark Monroe's Uptown House, New York, in early 1942. As described by Parker:

I'd been getting bored with the stereotyped changes that were being used ... and I kept thinking there's bound to be something else. I could hear it sometimes. I couldn't play it.... I was working over "Cherokee", and, as I did, I found that by using the higher intervals of a chord as a melody line and backing them with appropriately related changes, I could play the thing I'd been hearing. It came alive.

Gerhard Kubik postulates that the harmonic development in bebop sprang from the blues, and other African-related tonal sensibilities, rather than 20th century Western art music, as some have suggested. Kubik states: "Auditory inclinations were the African legacy in [Parker's] life, reconfirmed by the experience of the blues tonal system, a sound world at odds with the Western diatonic chord categories. Bebop musicians eliminated Western-style functional harmony in their music while retaining the strong central tonality of the blues as a basis for drawing upon various African matrices." Samuel Floyd states that blues were both the bedrock and propelling force of bebop, bringing about three main developments:

- A new harmonic conception, using extended chord structures that led to unprecedented harmonic and melodic variety.
- A developed and even more highly syncopated, linear rhythmic complexity and a melodic angularity in which the blue note of the fifth degree was established as an important melodic-harmonic device.
- The reestablishment of the blues as the music's primary organizing and functional principle.

Some of the harmonic innovations in bebop appear similar to innovations in Western "serious" music, from Claude Debussy to Arnold Schoenberg, although bebop has few direct borrowings from classical music and appears to largely revive tonal-harmonic ideas taken from the blues in a basically non-Western approach rooted in African traditions. However, bebop probably drew on many sources. A YouTube video with Jimmy Raney, a jazz guitarist who played with Charlie Parker, describes how Parker would listen to the music of Béla Bartók, a leading 20th century classical composer. Raney describes Parker's knowledge of Bartók and Arnold Schoenberg, particularly Schoenberg's Pierrot Lunaire, and says that a section from Bartók's Fifth Quartet sounded a lot like some of Parker's jazz improvisation.

== History ==
=== Swing era influences ===
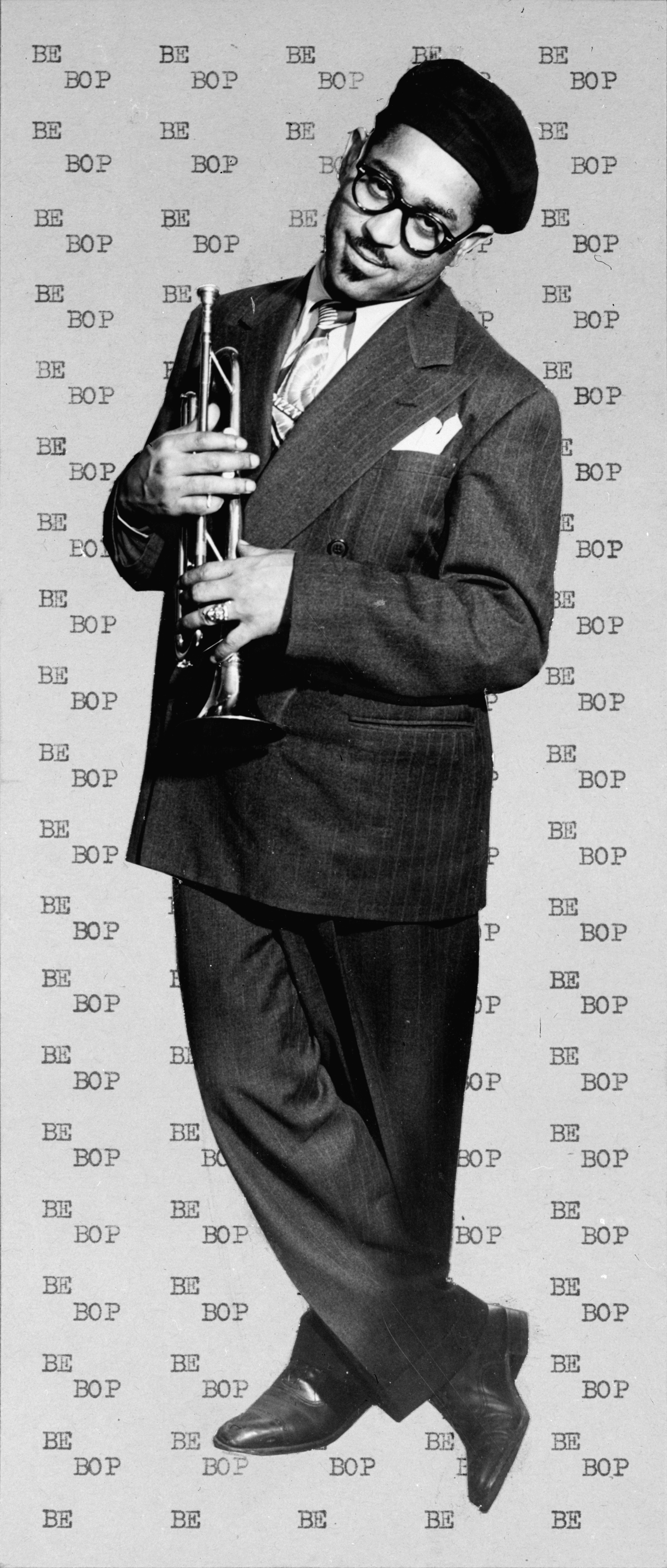
Dizzy Gillespie at the Downbeat Club, New York, circa 1947

Bebop grew out of the culmination of trends that had been occurring within swing music since the mid-1930s: less explicit timekeeping by the drummer, with the primary rhythmic pulse moving from the bass drum to the ride cymbal; a changing role for the piano away from rhythmic density towards accents and fills; less ornate horn section arrangements, trending towards riffs and more support for the underlying rhythm; more emphasis on freedom for soloists; and increasing harmonic sophistication in arrangements used by some bands. "One of the greatest revolutions of 1940s jazz is the relationship between the interpretative act and the compositional act." The path towards rhythmically streamlined, solo-oriented swing was blazed by the territory bands of the southwest with Kansas City as their musical capital. Their music was based on blues and other simple chord changes, riff-based in its approach to melodic lines and solo accompaniment, and expressing an approach adding melody and harmony to swing rather than the other way around. Ability to play sustained, high energy, and creative solos was highly valued for this newer style and the basis of intense competition. Swing-era jam sessions and "cutting contests" in Kansas City became legendary. The Kansas City approach to swing was epitomized by the Count Basie Orchestra, which came to national prominence in 1937.

Bebop wasn't developed in any deliberate way.

— Thelonious Monk

One young admirer of the Basie orchestra in Kansas City was Charlie Parker, a teenage alto saxophone player who was especially enthralled by their tenor saxophone player Lester Young, who played long flowing melodic lines that wove in and out of the chordal structure of the composition but somehow always made musical sense. Young was equally daring with his rhythm and phrasing as with his approach to harmonic structures in his solos. He would frequently repeat simple two or three note figures, with shifting rhythmic accents expressed by volume, articulation, or tone. His phrasing was far removed from the two or four bar phrases that horn players had used until then. They would often be extended to an odd number of measures, overlapping the musical stanzas suggested by the harmonic structure. He would take a breath in the middle of a phrase, using the pause, or "free space", as a creative device. The overall effect was that his solos were something floating above the rest of the music, rather than something springing from it at intervals suggested by the ensemble sound. When the Basie orchestra burst onto the national scene with its 1937 recordings and widely broadcast New York engagements, it gained a national following, with legions of saxophone players striving to imitate Young, drummers striving to imitate Jo Jones, piano players striving to imitate Basie, and trumpet players striving to imitate Buck Clayton. Parker played along with the new Basie recordings on a Victrola until he could play Young's solos note for note.

In the late 1930s, the Duke Ellington Orchestra and the Jimmie Lunceford Orchestra were exposing the music world to harmonically sophisticated musical arrangements by Billy Strayhorn and Sy Oliver, respectively, which implied chords as much as they spelled them out. This understatement of harmonically sophisticated chords would soon be used by young musicians exploring the new musical language of bebop.

The technique and harmonic sophistication of pianist Art Tatum inspired young musicians including Charlie Parker and Bud Powell. In his early days in New York, Parker held a job washing dishes at an establishment where Tatum had a regular gig.

One of the divergent trends of the swing era was a resurgence of small ensembles playing "head" arrangements, following the approach used with Basie's big band. The small band format lent itself to more impromptu experimentation and more extended solos than did the bigger, more highly arranged bands. The 1939 recording of "Body and Soul" by Coleman Hawkins with a small band featured an extended saxophone solo with minimal reference to the theme that was unique in recorded jazz, and which would become characteristic of bebop. This solo showed a sophisticated harmonic exploration of the composition, with implied passing chords. Hawkins would eventually go on to lead the first formal recording of the bebop style in early 1944.

=== Going beyond swing in New York ===
As the 1930s turned to the 1940s, Parker went to New York as a featured player in the Jay McShann Orchestra. While in New York, he found other musicians who were exploring the harmonic and melodic limits of their music, including Dizzy Gillespie, a Roy Eldridge-influenced trumpet player who, like Parker, was exploring ideas based on upper chord intervals, beyond the seventh chords that had traditionally defined jazz harmony. While Gillespie was with Cab Calloway, he practiced with bassist Milt Hinton and developed some of the key harmonic and chordal innovations that would be the cornerstones of the new music; Parker did the same with bassist Gene Ramey while with McShann's group. Guitarist Charlie Christian, who had arrived in New York in 1939, was, like Parker, an innovator extending a southwestern style. Christian's major influence was in the realm of rhythmic phrasing. Christian commonly emphasized weak beats and off beats, and often ended his phrases on the second half of the fourth beat. He experimented with asymmetrical phrasing, which was to become a core element of the new bop style.

Bud Powell was pushing forward with a rhythmically streamlined, harmonically sophisticated, virtuosic piano style, and Thelonious Monk was adapting the new harmonic ideas to his style that was rooted in Harlem stride piano playing. Drummers such as Kenny Clarke and Max Roach were extending the path set by Jo Jones, adding the ride cymbal to the high hat cymbal as a primary timekeeper and reserving the bass drum for accents. Bass drum accents were colloquially termed "bombs", which referenced events in the world outside of New York as the new music was being developed. The new style of drumming supported and responded to soloists with accents and fills, almost like a shifting call and response. This change increased the importance of the string bass. The bass not only maintained the music's harmonic foundation, but also became responsible for establishing a metronomic rhythmic foundation by playing a "walking" bass line of four quarter notes to the bar. While small swing ensembles commonly functioned without a bassist, the new bop style required a bass in every small ensemble.

The kindred spirits developing the new music gravitated to sessions at Minton's Playhouse, where Monk and Clarke were in the house band, and Monroe's Uptown House, where Max Roach was in the house band. Part of the atmosphere created at jams like the ones found at Minton's Playhouse was an air of exclusivity: the "regular" musicians would often reharmonize the standards, add complex rhythmic and phrasing devices into their melodies, or "heads", and play them at breakneck tempos in order to exclude those whom they considered outsiders or simply weaker players. These pioneers of the new music, which would later be termed "bebop" or "bop" (although Parker himself never used the term, feeling it demeaned the music), began exploring advanced harmonies, complex syncopation, altered chords and chord substitutions. The bop musicians advanced these techniques with a more freewheeling, intricate, often arcane approach. Bop improvisers built upon the phrasing ideas first brought to attention by Lester Young's soloing style. They would often deploy phrases over an odd number of bars and overlap their phrases across bar lines and across major harmonic cadences. Christian and the other early boppers would also begin stating a harmony in their improvised line before it appeared in the song form being outlined by the rhythm section. This momentary dissonance creates a strong sense of forward motion in the improvisation. The sessions also attracted top musicians in the swing idiom, such as Coleman Hawkins, Lester Young, Ben Webster, Roy Eldridge, and Don Byas. Byas became the first tenor saxophone player to fully assimilate the new bebop style into his playing. In 1944, the crew of innovators was joined by Dexter Gordon, a tenor saxophone player from the west coast in New York with the Louis Armstrong band, and Miles Davis, a young trumpet player attending the Juilliard School of Music.

=== Early recordings ===
Bebop originated as "musicians' music", played by musicians with other money-making gigs who did not care about the commercial potential of the new music. It did not attract the attention of major record labels nor was it intended to. Some of the early bebop was recorded informally. Some sessions at Minton's in 1941 were recorded, with Thelonious Monk alongside an assortment of musicians including Joe Guy, Hot Lips Page, Roy Eldridge, Don Byas, and Charlie Christian. Christian is featured in recordings from May 12, 1941 (Esoteric ES 548). Charlie Parker and Dizzy Gillespie were both participants at a recorded jam session hosted by Billy Eckstine on February 15, 1943, and Parker at another Eckstine jam session on February 28, 1943 (Stash ST-260; ST-CD-535).

Much of bebop's development happened during the 1942–1944 musicians' strike, when the American Federation of Musicians (AFM) barred its more than 130,000 members from recording on major record labels (singers were exempted). The strike had major effects, as some of the larger swing bands dispersed into smaller combos more suited to experimentation, and it meant bebop's evolution went largely unrecorded.

The first formal recordings of bebop were in 1944 under small specialty labels, which were less concerned than major labels with mass-market appeal. On February 16, 1944, Coleman Hawkins led a session including Dizzy Gillespie and Don Byas, with a rhythm section consisting of Clyde Hart (piano), Oscar Pettiford (bass) and Max Roach (drums) that recorded "Woody'n You" for Apollo Records, the first formal recording of bebop. Charlie Parker and Clyde Hart were recorded in a quintet led by guitarist Tiny Grimes for Savoy Records on September 15, 1944 ("Tiny's Tempo", "I'll Always Love You Just the Same", "Romance Without Finance" and "Red Cross"). Hawkins led another bebop-influenced recording session on October 19, 1944, this time with Thelonious Monk on piano, Edward Robinson on bass, and Denzil Best on drums ("On the Bean", "Recollections", "Flyin' Hawk" and "Driftin' on a Reed").

Parker, Gillespie, and others working the bebop idiom joined the Earl Hines Orchestra in 1943, then followed vocalist Billy Eckstine out of the band into the Billy Eckstine Orchestra in 1944. The Eckstine band was recorded on V-discs, which were broadcast over the Armed Forces Radio Network and gained popularity for the band showcasing the new bebop style. The format of the Eckstine band, featuring vocalists and entertaining banter, would later be emulated by Gillespie and others leading bebop-oriented big bands in a style that might be termed "popular bebop". Starting with the Eckstine band's session for De Luxe Records on December 5, 1944 ("If That's the Way You Feel", "I Want to Talk About You", "Blowing the Blues Away", "Opus X", "I'll Wait and Pray" and "The Real Thing Happened to Me"), bebop recording sessions grew more frequent. Parker had left the band by that date, but it still included Gillespie along with Dexter Gordon and Gene Ammons on tenor, Leo Parker on baritone, Tommy Potter on bass, Art Blakey on drums, and Sarah Vaughan on vocals. "Blowing the Blues Away" featured a tenor saxophone duel between Gordon and Ammons.

On January 4, 1945, Clyde Hart led a session including Parker, Gillespie, and Don Byas, recorded for Continental Records ("What's the Matter Now", "I Want Every Bit of It", "That's the Blues", "G.I. Blues", "Dream of You", "Seventh Avenue", "Sorta Kinda" and "Ooh Ooh, My My, Ooh Ooh"). On January 9, 1945, Gillespie recorded his first session as a leader for Manor Records, with Don Byas on tenor, Trummy Young on trombone, Clyde Hart on piano, Oscar Pettiford on bass, and Irv Kluger on drums ("I Can't Get Started", "Good Bait", "Be-bop (Dizzy's Fingers)", and "Salt Peanuts", the last of which was incorrectly listed as "Salted Peanuts"). Thereafter, Gillespie would record bebop prolifically and gain recognition as one of its leading figures. On February 9, 1945, Gillespie featured Gordon as a sideman in a session recorded for the Guild label ("Groovin' High" and "Blue 'n' Boogie"). On February 28, 1945, Parker appeared in Gillespie-led sessions for the Guild label ("Groovin' High", "All the Things You Are", and "Dizzy Atmosphere") and May 11, 1945 ("Salt Peanuts", "Shaw 'Nuff", "Lover Man" and "Hothouse"). On May 25, 1945, Parker and Gillespie served as sidemen with Sarah Vaughan in a session for Continental ("What More Can a Woman Do", "I'd Rather Have a Memory Than a Dream", and "Mean to Me"). On June 6, 1945, Parker and Gillespie appeared in a session under vibraphonist Red Norvo, which was released by Dial Records ("Hallelujah", "Get Happy", "Slam Slam Blues" and "Congo Blues"). On September 4, 1945, Sir Charles Thompson's all-star session for Apollo ("Takin' Off", "If I Had You", "Twentieth Century Blues" and "The Street Beat") featured Parker and Gordon. Gordon led his first session for Savoy on October 30, 1945, with Sadik Hakim (Argonne Thornton) on piano, Gene Ramey on bass, and Eddie Nicholson on drums ("Blow Mr Dexter", "Dexter's Deck", "Dexter's Cuttin' Out" and "Dexter's Minor Mad"). On November 26, 1945, Parker recorded first session as a leader for Savoy, with Miles Davis and Gillespie on trumpet, Hakim/Thornton and Gillespie on piano, Curley Russell on bass and Max Roach on drums ("Warming Up a Riff", "Now's the Time", "Billie's Bounce", "Thriving on a Riff", "Ko-Ko" and "Meandering"). After appearing as a sideman in the rhythm and blues-oriented Cootie Williams Orchestra through 1944, Bud Powell was in bebop sessions led by Frankie Socolow for the Duke label on May 2, 1945 ("The Man I Love", "Reverse the Charges", "Blue Fantasy" and "September in the Rain"), and by Dexter Gordon for Savoy on January 29, 1946 ("Long Tall Dexter", "Dexter Rides Again", "I Can't Escape from You" and "Dexter Digs In"). The growth of bebop through 1945 is also documented in informal live recordings.

=== Breakout ===
By 1946, bebop had been established as a broad-based movement among New York jazz musicians, including trumpeters Fats Navarro and Kenny Dorham, trombonists J. J. Johnson and Kai Winding, alto saxophonist Sonny Stitt, tenor saxophonist James Moody, baritone saxophonists Leo Parker and Serge Chaloff, vibraphonist Milt Jackson, pianists Erroll Garner and Al Haig, bassist Slam Stewart, and others who would contribute to what would become known as "modern jazz". The new music was gaining radio exposure with broadcasts such as those hosted by "Symphony Sid" Torin. Bebop was taking root in Los Angeles as well, among such modernists as trumpeters Howard McGhee and Art Farmer, alto players Sonny Criss and Frank Morgan, tenor players Teddy Edwards and Lucky Thompson, trombonist Melba Liston, pianists Dodo Marmarosa, Jimmy Bunn and Hampton Hawes, guitarist Barney Kessel, bassists Charles Mingus and Red Callender, and drummers Roy Porter and Connie Kay. In December 1945, Gillespie's "Rebop Six" (with Parker on alto, Lucky Thompson on tenor, Al Haig on piano, Milt Jackson on vibes, Ray Brown on bass, and Stan Levey on drums) started an engagement in Los Angeles. Parker and Thompson remained in Los Angeles after the rest of the band left, performing and recording together for six months before Parker suffered an addiction-related breakdown in July. Parker was again active in Los Angeles in early 1947. Parker and Thompson's tenures in Los Angeles, the arrival of Dexter Gordon and Wardell Gray later in 1946, and the promotional efforts of Ross Russell, Norman Granz, and Gene Norman helped solidify the city's status as a center of the new music.

Gillespie landed the first recording date with a major label for the new music, with the RCA Bluebird label recording Dizzy Gillespie and his Orchestra on February 22, 1946 ("52nd Street Theme", "A Night in Tunisia", "Ol' Man Rebop" and "Anthropology"). Later Afro-Cuban styled recordings for Bluebird in collaboration with Cuban rumberos Chano Pozo and Sabu Martinez, and arrangers Gil Fuller and George Russell ("Manteca", "Cubana Be, Cubana Bop", and "Guarache Guaro") would be among his most popular, giving rise to the Latin dance music craze of the late 1940s and early 1950s. Gillespie, with his extroverted personality and humor, glasses, lip beard and beret, would become the most visible symbol of the new music and new jazz culture in popular consciousness, which slighted the contributions of others with whom he had developed the music over the preceding years. His show style, influenced by black vaudeville circuit entertainers, seemed like a throwback to some and offended some purists ("too much grinning," according to Miles Davis), but was laced with a subversive sense of humor that gave a glimpse of attitudes on racial matters that black musicians had previously kept away from the public at large. Before the Civil Rights Movement, Gillespie was confronting the racial divide by lampooning it. The intellectual subculture that surrounded bebop made it something of a sociological movement as well as a musical one.

With the fall of the big swing bands, bebop had become the dynamic focus of the jazz world, with a broad-based "progressive jazz" movement seeking to emulate and adapt its devices. It was to be the most influential foundation of jazz for a generation of jazz musicians.

=== Beyond ===
By 1950, bebop musicians such as Clifford Brown and Sonny Stitt began to smooth out the rhythmic eccentricities of early bebop. Instead of using jagged phrasing to create rhythmic interest as the early boppers had, these musicians constructed their improvised lines out of long strings of eighth notes and simply accented certain notes in the line to create rhythmic variety. The early 1950s also saw some smoothing in Charlie Parker's style.

Bebop remained at the top of awareness of jazz during the early 1950s, while its harmonic devices were adapted to the new "cool" school of jazz, led by Miles Davis and others. It continued to attract young musicians such as Jackie McLean, Sonny Rollins, and John Coltrane. As musicians and composers began to work with expanded music theory during the mid-1950s, its adaptation by musicians who worked it into the basic dynamic approach of bebop would lead to the development of post-bop. Around that same time, a move towards structural simplification of bebop occurred among musicians such as Horace Silver and Art Blakey, leading to the movement known as hard bop. Development of jazz would occur through the interplay of bebop, cool jazz, post-bop, and hard bop styles through the 1950s.

== Influence ==
The musical devices developed with bebop were influential far beyond the bebop movement itself. "Progressive jazz" was a broad category of music that included bebop-influenced "art music" arrangements used by big bands, such as those led by Boyd Raeburn, Charlie Ventura, Claude Thornhill, and Stan Kenton, and the cerebral harmonic explorations of smaller groups, such as those led by pianists Lennie Tristano and Dave Brubeck. Voicing experiments based on bebop harmonic devices were used by Miles Davis and Gil Evans for the groundbreaking "Birth of the Cool" sessions in 1949 and 1950. Musicians who followed the stylistic doors opened by Davis, Evans, Tristano and Brubeck formed the core of the cool jazz and "west coast jazz" movements of the early 1950s.

By the mid-1950s, musicians began to be influenced by music theory proposed by George Russell. Those who incorporated Russell's ideas into the bebop foundation defined the post-bop movement that later incorporated modal jazz into its musical language.

Hard bop was a simplified derivative of bebop introduced by Horace Silver and Art Blakey in the mid-1950s. It became a major influence until the late 1960s when free jazz and fusion jazz gained ascendancy.

The neo-bop movement of the 1980s and 1990s revived the influence of bebop, post-bop, and hard bop styles after the free jazz and fusion eras.

Bebop style also influenced the Beat Generation, whose spoken-word style drew on African-American "jive" dialog and jazz rhythms, and whose poets often employed jazz musicians to accompany them. Jack Kerouac would describe his writing in his 1957 novel On the Road as a literary translation of the improvisations of Charlie Parker and Lester Young. The "beatnik" stereotype borrowed heavily from the dress and mannerisms of bebop musicians and followers, in particular the beret and lip beard of Dizzy Gillespie and the patter and bongo drumming of guitarist Slim Gaillard. The bebop subculture, defined as a non-conformist group expressing its values through musical communion, would be echoed in the attitude of the psychedelia-era hippies of the 1960s. Fans of bebop were not restricted to the United States, as the style also gained cult status in France and Japan.

More recently, hip-hop artists such as A Tribe Called Quest and Guru have cited bebop as an influence on their rapping and rhythmic style. As early as 1983, Shawn Brown rapped the phrase "Rebop, bebop, Scooby-Doo" toward the end of the hit "Rappin' Duke". Bassist Ron Carter collaborated with A Tribe Called Quest on their 1991 album The Low End Theory, and vibraphonist Roy Ayers and trumpeter Donald Byrd were featured on Guru's 1993 album Guru's Jazzmatazz, Vol. 1. Bebop samples, especially bass lines, ride cymbal swing clips, and horn and piano riffs are found throughout the hip-hop compendium.
