= Pétion-Ville =

Pétion-Ville Petyonvil (Haitian Creole)
- Commune
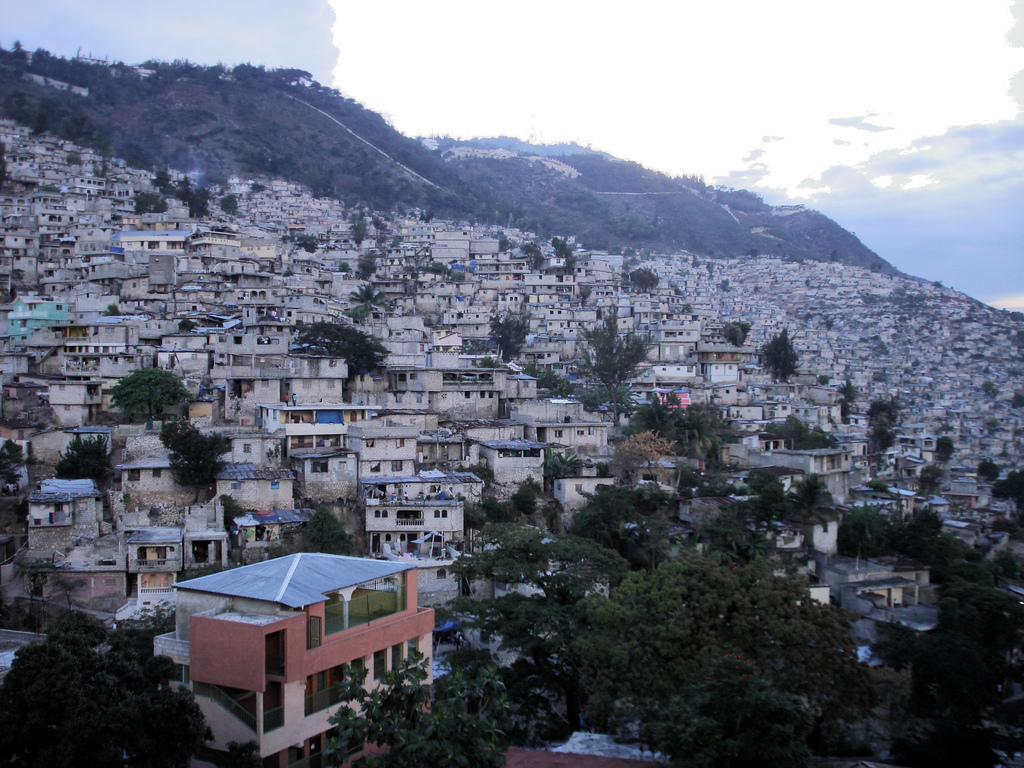
- Pétion-Ville's hillside

- Location in Haiti
- Coordinates: 18°30′46″N 72°17′11″W
- Country: Haiti
- Department: Ouest
- Arrondissement: Port-au-Prince

Area
  - Total: 63.90 sq mi (165.49 km^{2})

Population (2015 Est.)
  - Total: 376,834
  - Density: 5,900/sq mi (2,277/km^{2})
- Time zone: UTC-05:00 (EST)
  - Summer (DST): UTC-04:00 (EDT)

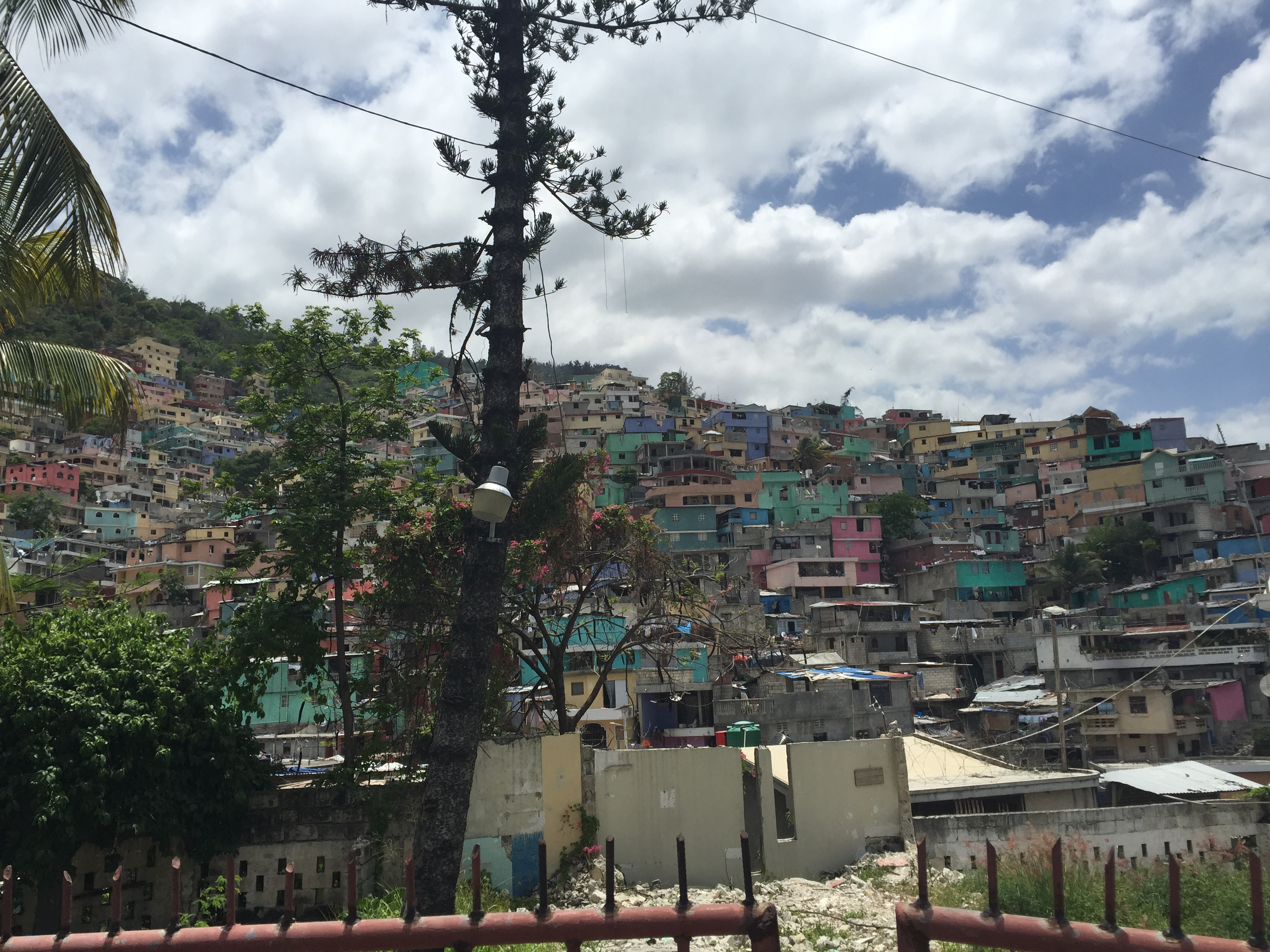
Pétion-Ville in 2015

Pétion-Ville (French pronunciation: [petjɔ̃ vil]; Haitian Creole: Petyonvil) is a commune and a suburb of Port-au-Prince, Haiti, in the hills east and separate from the city itself on the northern hills of the Massif de la Selle. Founded in 1831 by president Jean-Pierre Boyer, it was named after Alexandre Sabès Pétion (1770–1818), the Haitian general and president later recognized as one of the country's four founding fathers.

The district is primarily a residential and touristic area. It had a population of 283,052 at the 2003 Census, which was officially estimated to have reached 376,834 in 2015. Many diplomats, foreign merchants and wealthy people who engage in business reside in Pétion-Ville.

Despite the distance from the capital and the general affluence of the district, the lack of administrative enforcement has led to the formation of shantytowns on the outer edges of the district, as poor locals migrate upward and have settled there in search of job opportunities. On 28 or 29 August 2020, Haitian lawyer Monferrier Dorval was assassinated in front of his home. On 7 July 2021, Haitian president Jovenel Moïse was assassinated at his private residence.

== 2010 earthquake ==
On 12 January 2010, around 4:53 pm, a 7.0 earthquake struck the Pétion-Ville area. The earthquake caused the collapse of a hospital in the city. The 7.0-magnitude earthquake destroyed many buildings in Port-au-Prince, and a lot of homes in the Montana area, including the Hôtel Montana.

The Club de Pétion-Ville golf course was converted into a tent city by the US Army and housed 50,000 to 80,000 Haitians in 2010. Its tennis courts hosted elements of the US 82nd Airborne division. The club was built in the 1930s and had around 300 members at the time. The golf clubhouse was turned into a field hospital.

In early February 2010, the Israeli-based humanitarian organization, IsraAid, opened a child education center in the Pétion-Ville tent city, in conjunction with other agencies, such as Operation Blessing. The center was set up initially in the tents from the Israel Defense Forces' field hospital.

The "Muncheez" pizza restaurant was turned into a community soup kitchen. It served approximately 1,000 free meals a day. Before the quake, the restaurant chain was a place where few even in Pétion-Ville could afford to eat. After the quake, owners realized that the food stored at the three restaurants would spoil before it would get back into business and decided to give it all away. Although still living in the streets, the cooks still came to cook for the masses. Owners distributed blue bracelets throughout Pétion-Ville, one bracelet for one meal. They selected one of the outlets to become the soup kitchen and moved all 105 employees to that site to cook. When food ran out after two days, the Hôtel Montana donated what could be salvaged from their freezers. When they began running out of fuel, cooking oil and food, a convoy from relatives of the owners in the Dominican Republic arrived, funded by donations with more food and fuel. USAID supplied fuel, cooking oil and food to cook, and World Vision supplied bulgur and lentils.

Electricity was restored to some sectors at the beginning of February and to most of the rest of the city later.

== 2021 assassination of Jovenel Moïse ==
On 7 July 2021, then-President of Haiti Jovenel Moïse was assassinated by a group of 28 gunmen while sleeping in his private residence located in Pétion-Ville.

== Facilities ==
The Club de Pétion-Ville country club was built in the 1930s and has Haiti's only golf course, a nine-hole course. It also contains tennis courts and a swimming pool. The Club de Pétion-Ville is not in the suburb of Pétion-Ville, but is actually in Bourdon.

The El Rancho Hotel & Casino is in Pétion-Ville. It was built from the private estate of Albert Silvera, a sports and luxury car collector who was one of the pioneers of Haiti's hotel industry.

Hotel Karibe

In the neighborhood of Juvenat, the Hotel Karibe is a 174-room hotel with a spa, restaurant and conference center. In 2014, it hosted the Miss Haiti pageant.

Cabane Choucoune is a cabaret and thatch-roofed club. It was built on 1940 by Max Ewald. It is known as one of the best méringue dance clubs. It has featured Haitian artists such as Nemours Jean-Baptiste as well as international entertainers.

== Education ==
Union School Haiti is in Pétion-Ville.

== Notable people ==
- Widline Cadet, photographer
- Jean-Claude Castera, painter
- Jimmy Jean-Louis, actor
- Stevenson Magloire, painter
- Maryse Narcisse, politician

== See also ==
- Cabane Choucoune, famous cabaret and thatch-roofed dance club
- Don Bosco FC, a professional football club
- Festival du Rhum Haiti, annual international festival
- Signal FM, a radio station
