= Beguine (dance) =

Dance and music form popular in the 1930s

- Etymology: Guadeloupean Creole French: begue
- Genre: Ballroom dance, Latin dance
- Origin: Guadeloupe, Martinique

The beguine (/bəˈɡiːn/ bə-GHEEN) is a dance and music form, similar to a slow rhumba. It was popular in the 1930s, coming from the islands of Guadeloupe and Martinique, where, in the local Antillean Creole language, beke or begue means a White man while beguine is the female form. It is a combination of Latin folk dance and French ballroom dance, and is a spirited yet slow, close dance with a roll of the hips, a movement inherited from rhumba.

After Cole Porter wrote the song "Begin the Beguine", the dance became more widely known beyond the Caribbean. The song was introduced in Porter's Jubilee musical (1935).

In 1984, Italian pop music duo Al Bano and Romina Power released the song "Al ritmo di beguine (Ti amo)" from their album Effetto amore.

== See also ==
- Biguine
