= Émile Roumer =

Haitian poet (1903–1988)

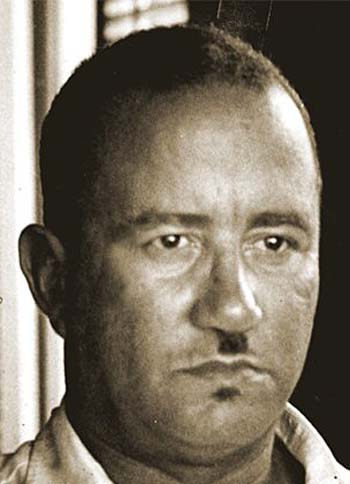
Émile Roumer

Émile Roumer (5 February 1903 – 6 April 1988) was a Haitian poet. Roumer wrote mostly satirical poems and poems dealing with love and nature. Born in Jérémie, he was educated in France before studying business in Manchester, England.

== Bibliography ==
- Poèmes d'Haïti et de France (1925)
- Poèmes en Vers (1947)
- Le Caïman Etoilé (1963)
- Rosaire Couronne Sonnets (1964)

== Death ==
Roumer died in Frankfurt, Germany in April 1988.

== Notes ==
- Schutt-Ainé, Patricia (1994). Haiti: A Basic Reference Book. Miami, Florida: Librairie Au Service de la Culture. p. 105. ISBN 0-9638599-0-0.
