= Webert Sicot =

Haitian musician (1930–1985)

- Born: 1930; Port-au-Prince, Haiti
- Died: February 1985 (aged 54–55)
- Genre: Compas
- Occupations: Instrumentalist, composer, band leader
- Instrument: Saxophone

Webert Sicot (French: [wɛbɛʁ siko]; 1930 – February 1985) was a Haitian saxophone player, composer and band leader. He is recognized as one of the creators of compas also known as compas direct, a style of Haitian music born in the 1950s that he named cadence rampa after he left Nemours' band to differentiate himself in 1962 in the spirit of competition.

== Career ==
Sicot was born in Port-au-Prince, Haiti, in 1930. He took his first musical lessons from Augustin Bruno. He made his debut as professional with Claudin Toussaint's Jazz Capois. He also worked with the groups Jazz des Jeunes and the Saieh Orchestra, in the second half or the 1950s.

He founded with Nemours Jean-Baptiste the Conjunto International and took part in the Citadelle orchestra and Casino Internacional Band. With Jean-Baptiste, he created the compas direct, a variation of the Haitian méringue. In 1961 he commenced a solo career and became one of the pioneers of cadence rampa. He played several instruments as trumpet, bass, piano and drums. Because of his frequent Caribbean tours with his brother Raymond in the Caribbean, cadence became very popular in Dominica and the French Antilles of Guadeloupe and Martinique.

Sicot died in February 1985 and is considered as one of the most influentials band leaders in Haitian popular music.

== See also ==
- Music of Haiti
- Coronto International
