= Cabane Choucoune =

Cabaret and thatch-roofed club in Pétion-Ville, Haiti

Cabane Choucoune is a cabaret and thatch-roofed club in Pétion-Ville, Haiti. It was built on 8 December 1940 by Max Ewald. It is known as one of the best méringue dance clubs. Historically, it has featured Haitian artists such as Nemours Jean-Baptiste as well as international entertainers.

The construction appears like an inverted ice cream cone, that is high-peaked with a thatched cupola on top. From a distance, it resembles a chief's African jungle hut.

It is located about 500 m (1,600 ft) up the mountains behind Port-au-Prince, in Pétion-Ville, home to the country's elite.
