= Gabriel Alix =

Haitian painter (1930–1998)

Gabriel Alix (November 30, 1930–October 1998) was a Haitian painter.

== Biography ==
A native of Saint-Marc, Alix began to paint following the advice and encouragements of Hector Hyppolite, a friend of his father.

In 1946, Hyppolite introduced him to DeWitt Peters who had founded the Centre d'Art of Port-au-Prince two years prior. Subsequently, Alix became a member of the Centre d'Art, before joining the Galerie Issa in the mid-1980s.

His paintings often depict still lives, religious subjects, and animals in luscious jungle surroundings.

In 1954, one of his engravings was presented in an exhibition at the Museum of Modern Art in New York (MoMA), and still features in the museum's collection. Since then, he has participated in numerous exhibitions in the Caribbean, the United States, Latin America and Europe, and his works are regularly presented at auction, notably at Christie's or Drouot.
