= Jacques-Enguerrand Gourgue =

Haitian painter

Jacques-Enguerrand Gourgue (Port au Prince, 1930–1996) was one of Haiti's most renowned painters of the 20th century.

== Biography ==
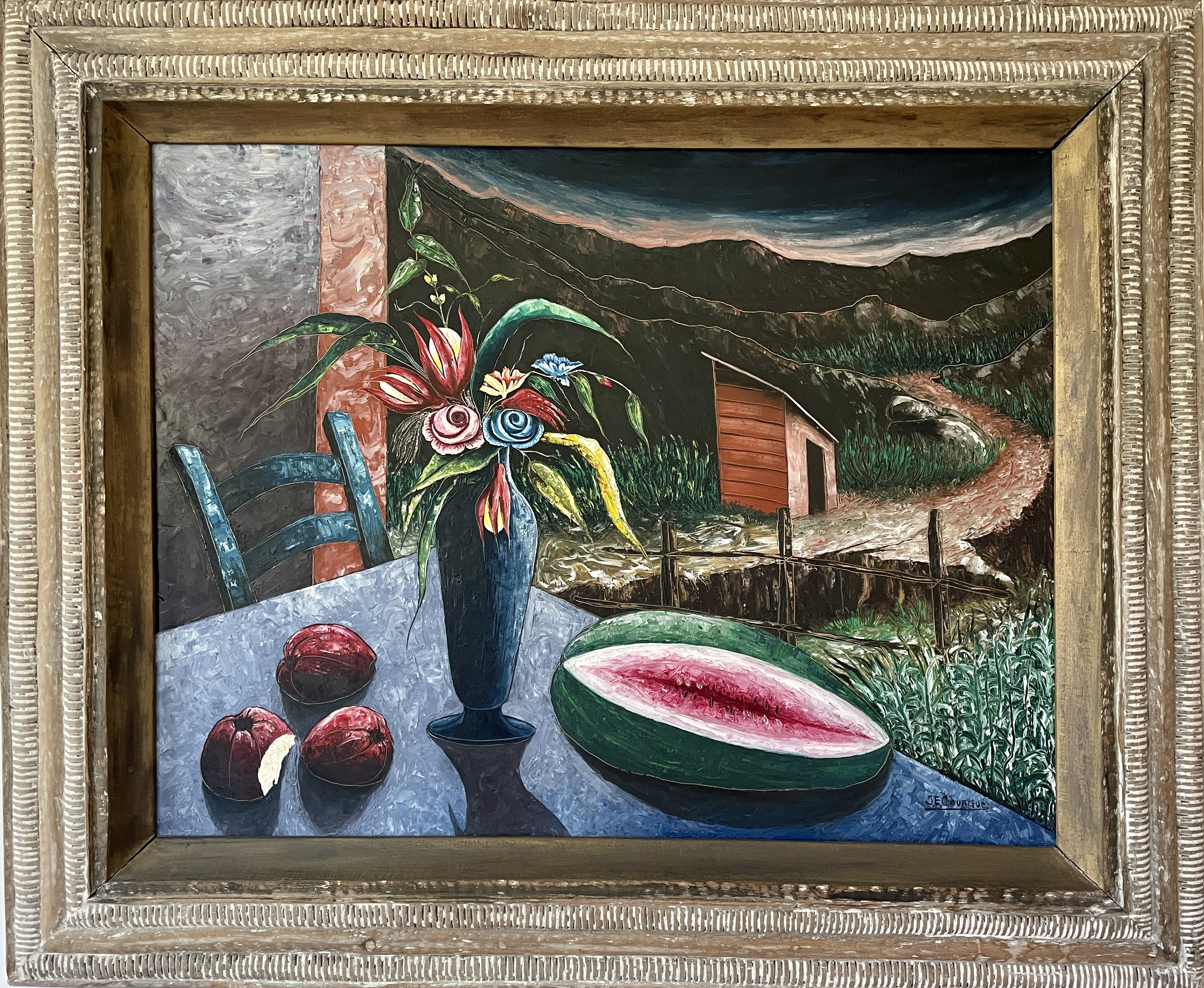
Jacques-Enguerrand Gourgue, still life, oil on masonite with frame by artist, 1960 (private collection)

A Port-au-Prince native, Gourgue began painting at an early age and eventually had his works exhibited throughout Europe and the Americas. His father was a French psychiatrist, and his mother said to be a Haitian vodou priestess. He typically painted scenes of rural Haitian life and vodou ceremonies. Gourgue, who had no formal training, often combined flowers, mountains, skeletal trees, peasants and their huts and vodou symbolism, in a personal style that managed to combine surrealism and naive art. "He is beyond dispute the leading figure in modern Haitian painting."

After a turbulent and troubled childhood, Gourgue came to Centre d'Art in Port-au-Prince in 1947. The following year his painting "The Magic Table"—an "unprecedented picture"—was exhibited at the Museum of Modern Art in New York, and it is still part of its permanent collection. In 1949, at the age of 18, he won the gold medal of an exhibition commemorating the bicentennial of the founding of Port au Prince.

During the decades of the 1950s and 1960s his style was greatly influenced by Pablo Picasso, in what is known as his "Spanish period". At that time Gourgue moved to Madrid, Spain, where he married a Spanish woman and had a daughter. He exhibited his work throughout Europe and North America, achieving major successes. Several of his works have been auctioned at Christie's and Sotheby's of New York.

"Gourgue's imagery is not easily interpreted by those not familiar with Haitian life, folklore, and religion," wrote Ute Stebich, a noted expert on Haitian art. "Juxtaposing familiar objects in a personal, always new and surprising way, his works seem to resist rather than to invite analysis. The artist's intention is to force the viewer to meet him on the level of the subconscious, giving free rein to emotion and fantasy."

After his divorce he moved to his hometown, where he painted most of his later work, including a large mural that decorated the flag of Haiti in the Seville Expo of 1992. He remarried and had two children with his second wife. He died in 1996 due to a heart attack.

== References and sources ==
=== Sources ===
- Schutt-Ainé, Patricia; Staff of Librairie Au Service de la Culture (1994). Haiti: A Basic Reference Book. Miami, Florida: Librairie Au Service de la Culture. p. 112. ISBN 0-9638599-0-0.
- Rodman, Selden (1982). Artists in Tune with Their World: Masters of Popular Art in the Americas & Their Relation to the Folk Tradition. Simon & Schuster.
- "Artist from Haiti - Jacques-Enguerrand Gourgue", MedaliaArt.
- Stebich, Ute (1978). Haitian Art. Henry N. Adams Inc.
