= Tourism in Haiti =

Tourism in Haiti is an industry that generated just under a million arrivals in 2012, and was typically one of the main sources of revenue for the nation. With its favorable climate, second-longest coastline of beaches, and most mountainous ranges in the Caribbean, waterfalls, caves, colonial architecture and distinct cultural history, Haiti has had its history as an attractive destination for tourists. However, unstable governments have long contested its history and the country's economic development throughout the 20th century.

== Overview ==
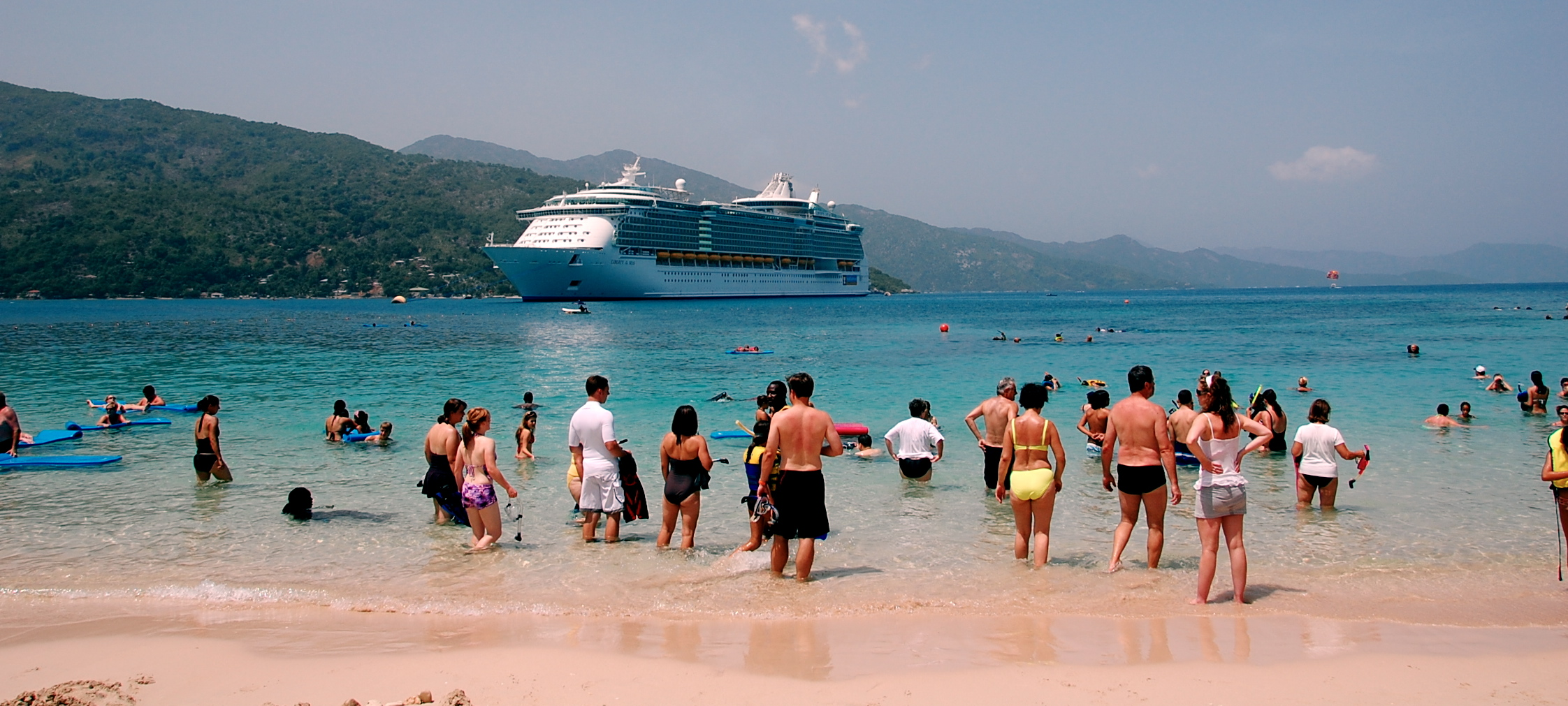
Labadee, a cruise ship destination

In 2012, the industry generated US$200 million (mostly from cruise ships). In December 2012, the US State Department issued a travel warning about the country, noting that while thousands of American citizens safely visit Haiti each year, foreign tourists had been victims of violent crime, including murder and kidnapping, predominantly in the Port-au-Prince area. Several hotels were opened in 2012, including a Best Western Premier, a five-star Royal Oasis hotel by Occidental Hotel and Resorts in Pétion-Ville, a four-star Marriott hotel in the Turgeau area of Port-au-Prince and other new hotel developments in Port-au-Prince, Les Cayes, Cap-Haïtien, and Jacmel. Other tourist destinations include Camp-Perrin, Pic Macaya, and Île-à-Vache which includes Port Morgan and Abaka Bay resorts. The four-star all-inclusive 400-room beachfront Royal Decameron Indigo Beach Resort & Spa, Cote des Arcadins opened in December 2015.

The Haitian Carnival has been one of the most popular carnivals in the Caribbean. In 2010, the government decided to stage the event in a different city outside of Port-au-Prince every year in an attempt to decentralize the country. The National Carnival which is usually held in one of the country's largest cities (i.e., Port-au-Prince, Cap-Haïtien or Les Cayes), follows the also very popular Jacmel Carnival which takes place a week earlier in February or March.

== History ==
=== Early boom ===
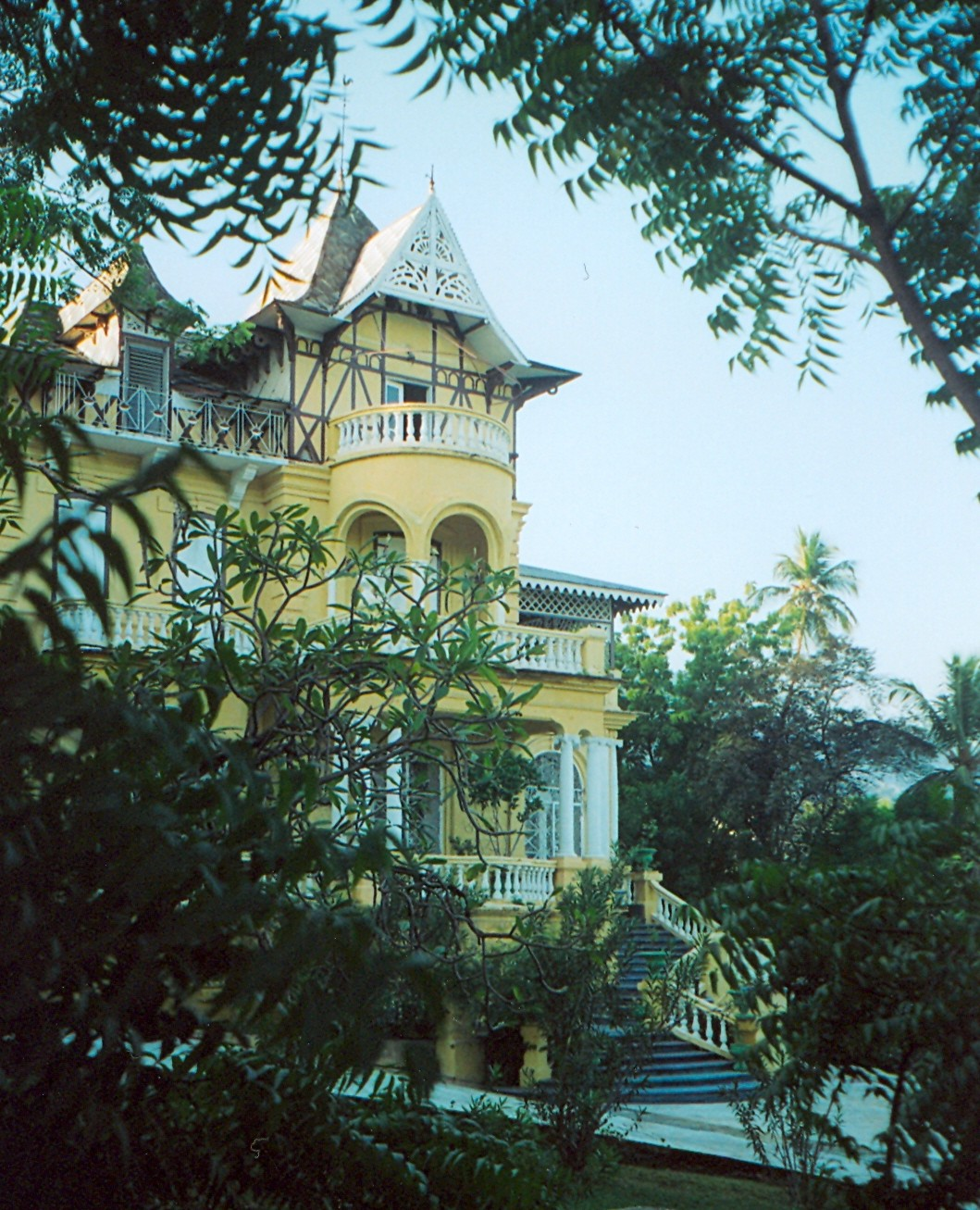
The Cordasco House, a 19th-century Gothic gingerbread mansion

Like most tourism during the turn of the 19th century, tourism in Haiti ostensibly began with a series of popularized travelogues. Many of these travel narratives were themselves the result of the "opening up" of Haiti during the US Occupation (1915-1934) and Western capitalist expansion across the greater Caribbean. Authors invariably wrote on topics concerning racism and "The Negro Question" (i.e. whether Haiti and blacks in general were capable of civilization and self-rule), Haitian revolutionary intrigue, and voodoo mystique. The sights which these texts reported became the foundation for the country's more celebrated attractions following World War II.

In the late 1940s and 1950s, tourists flocked to the waterfront area of Port-au-Prince, redeveloped to allow cruise ship passengers to walk from the docks to the famous cultural attractions. Among these attractions was the Moorish-styled Iron Market, where fine Haitian art and mahogany were sold, as the evenings were accompanied by dancing, casino gambling, or Voodoo shows. The exclusivity attracted the likes of Truman Capote and Noël Coward to the Hotel Oloffson, a 19th-century Gothic gingerbread mansion set in a lush tropical garden, which even was glorified in the Graham Greene novel, The Comedians.

Haiti's brief tourism boom was wiped out by the rule of Francois "Papa Doc" Duvalier and his unstable government. However, when his son Jean-Claude "Baby Doc" Duvalier succeeded him as President for Life, tourism returned in the 1970s, and again Haiti was a hot spot tourist destination drawing an average of 150,000 visitors annually, behind the Dominican Republic at the time which received 278,000 tourists in 1975. Tourists flocking to Haiti's new seaside beach resort, included Bill and Hillary Clinton who honeymooned there in 1975. Vive la différence has long been Haiti's national tourism slogan, and its proximity to the United States made Haiti a hot attraction until the Duvalier regime was ousted in 1986.

=== Late 20th and early 21st century ===
Since the second half of the 20th century, tourism in Haiti has suffered from the country's political upheaval. Inadequate infrastructure also has limited visitors to the island. Following the ouster of President Jean-Bertrand Aristide in 1991, tourism began to recover slowly. The Caribbean Tourism Organization (CTO) joined the Haitian government in efforts to restore the island's image as a tourist destination and despite obstacles, Haiti's rich culture and history allowed the country to maintain a moderate tourist industry. In 2001, 141,000 foreigners visited Haiti. Most came from the United States.

The city of Jacmel had a reputation as being less politically volatile, its French colonial era architecture, its colorful cultural carnival, pristine beaches, and a nascent film festival, continued to attract local tourists and a small amount of international tourism.

Royal Caribbean International maintained cruises to Labadee, a port located on the country's northern coast on which they have a long-term lease. Although sometimes described in advertisements as an island in its own right, it is actually contiguous with the rest of Hispaniola. Labadee is fenced off from the surrounding area. The cruise ships docked at the pier and passengers disembark directly to the resort without being allowed to visit other parts of the country. Attractions include a Haitian flea market, traditional Haitian dance performances, numerous beaches, water sports, and a water park. With violence increasing Royal Caribbean suspended its cruises to Labadee April 2025. The suspension was extended and will continue to June 2027 when it will be reviewed.

Due to ongoing political instability, tourism suffered and as of August 2026 most governments (including the US, Canada, UK, The Netherlands and Germany have the highest level of advisory against travel to Haiti for any reason

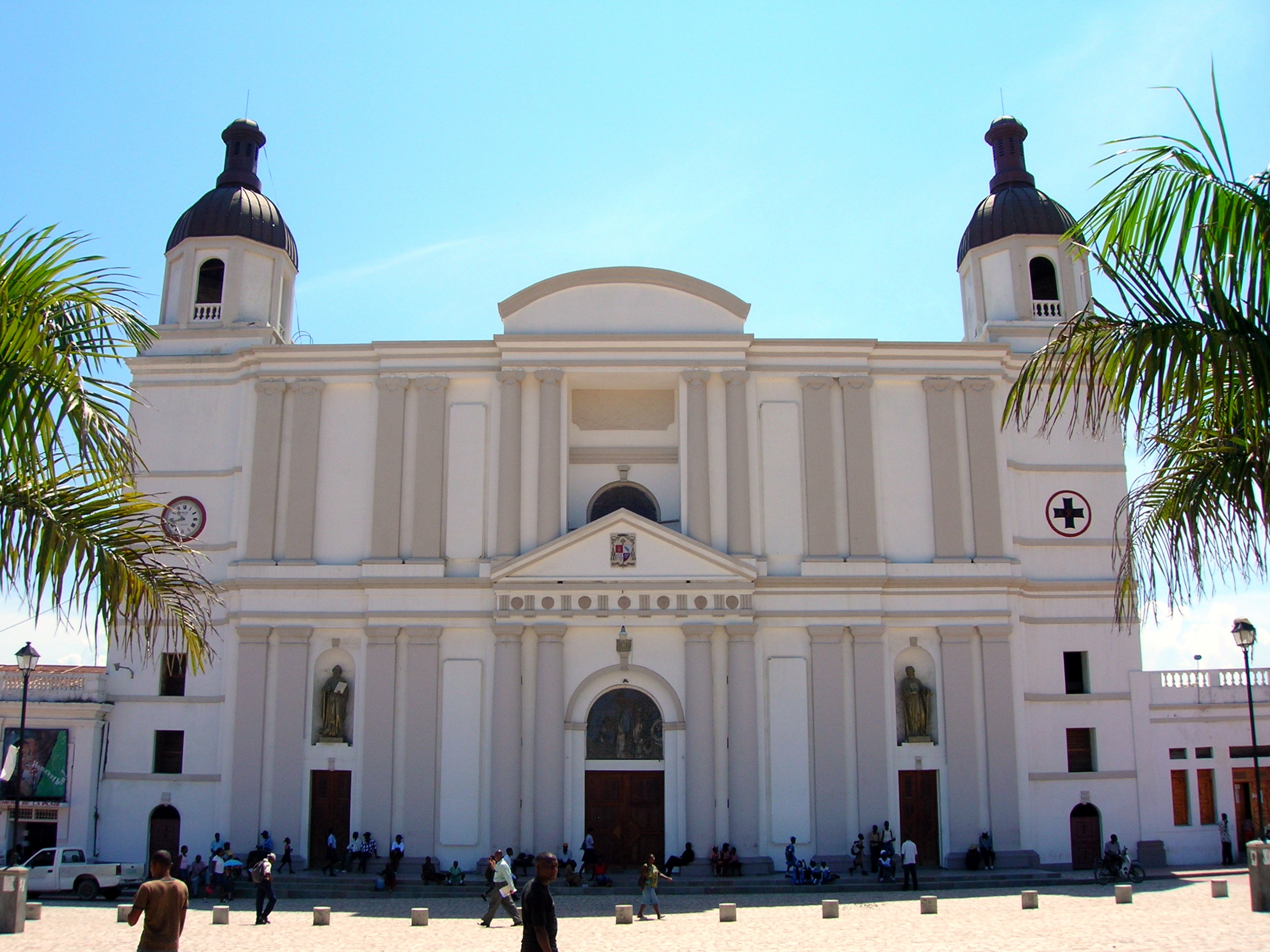
The well-preserved Cathedral Notre-Dame of Cap-Haïtien.

== World heritage ==
These are the UNESCO's World Heritage Sites in Haiti:

- National History Park, Milot. It contains the following buildings:
- Citadelle Laferrière, Milot. Constructed by King Henri I, the Citadelle Laferrière is a large mountaintop fortress in northern Haiti, and is the largest fortress in the Americas.
- Sans-Souci Palace, Milot. The most important of nine palaces built by the king, as well as fifteen châteaux, numerous forts, and sprawling summer homes on his twenty plantations.
- Buildings of Ramiers, Milot. One of the first buildings built after the Haitian Revolution.
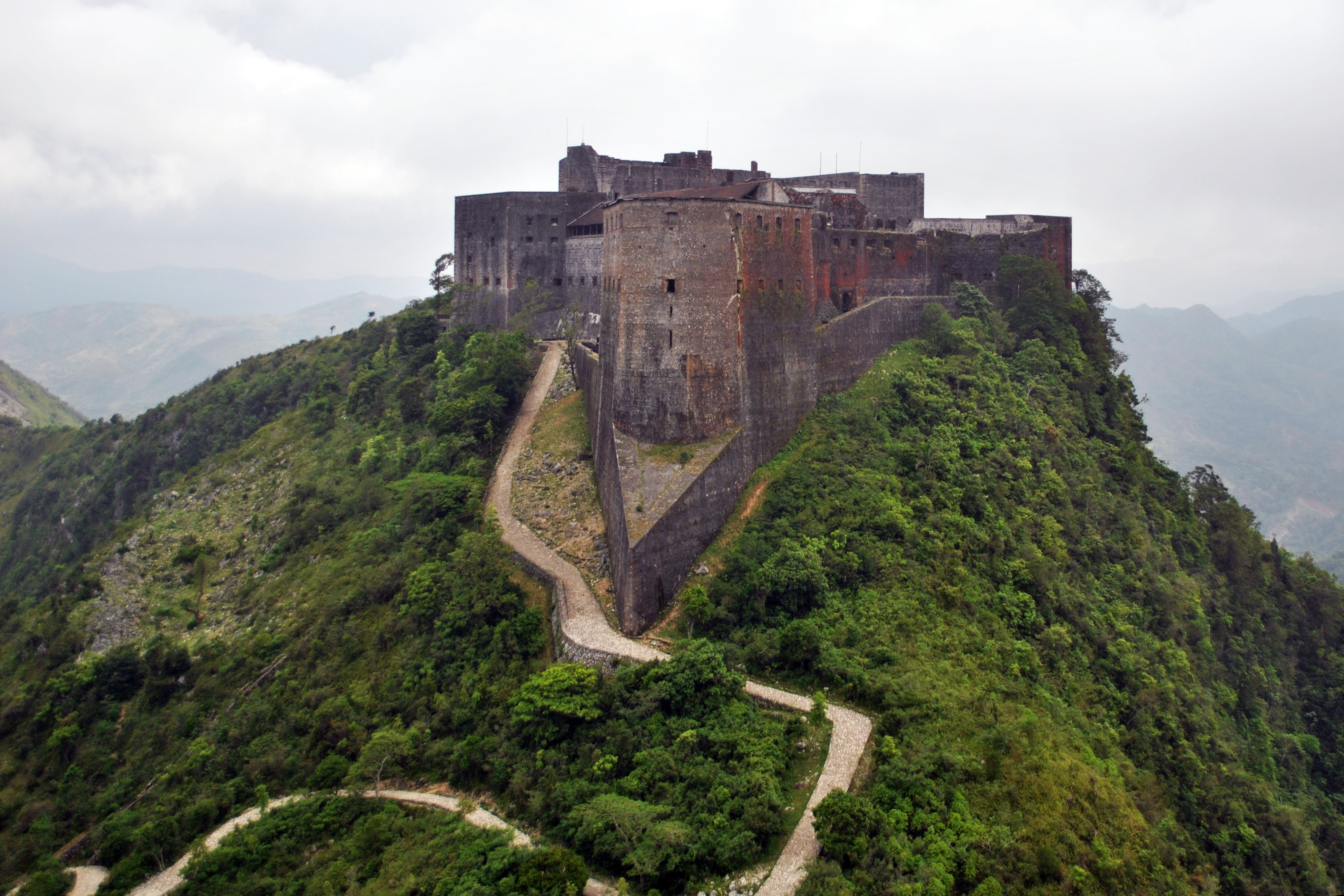
Citadelle Laferrière

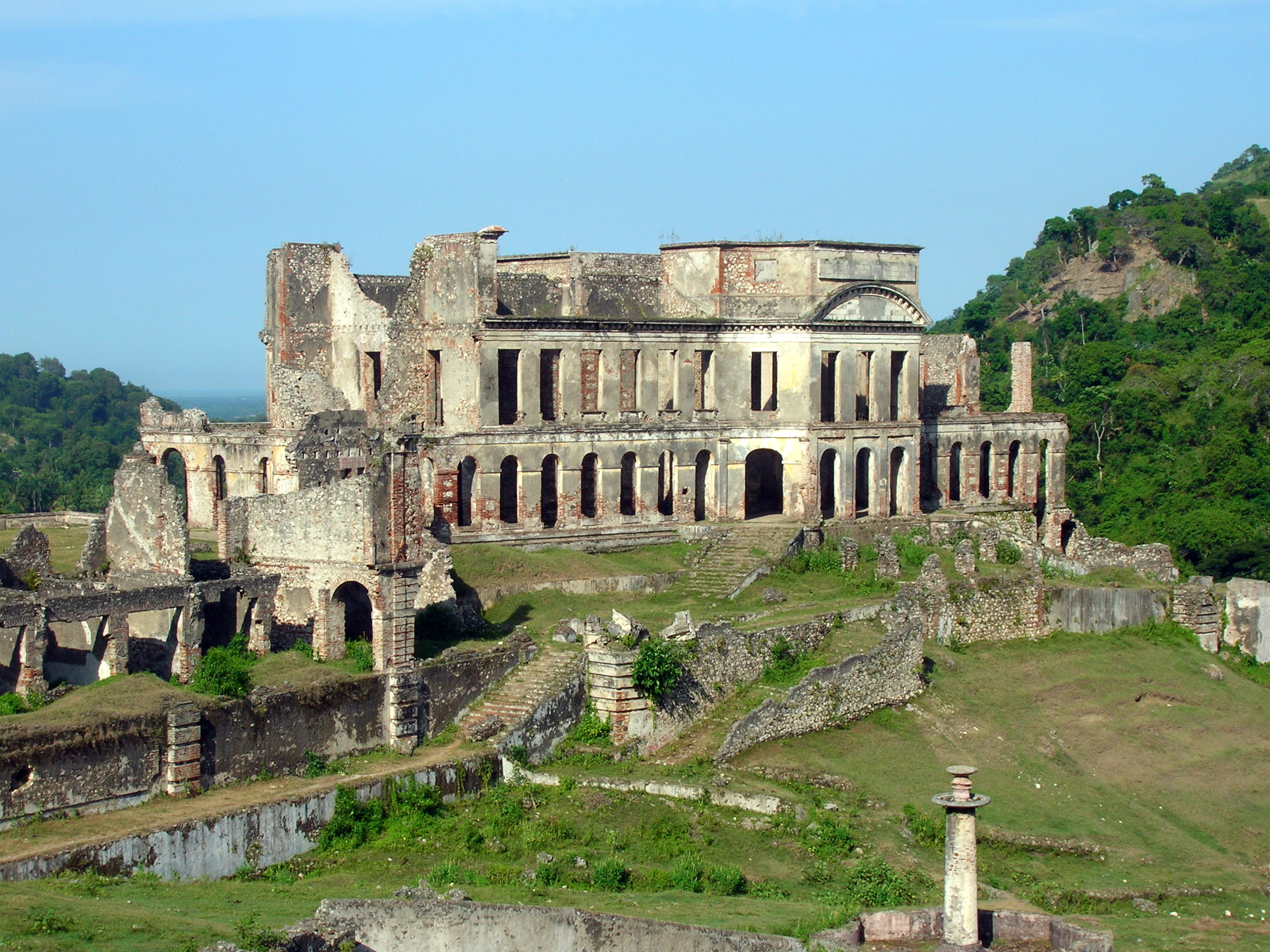
Sans-Souci Palace

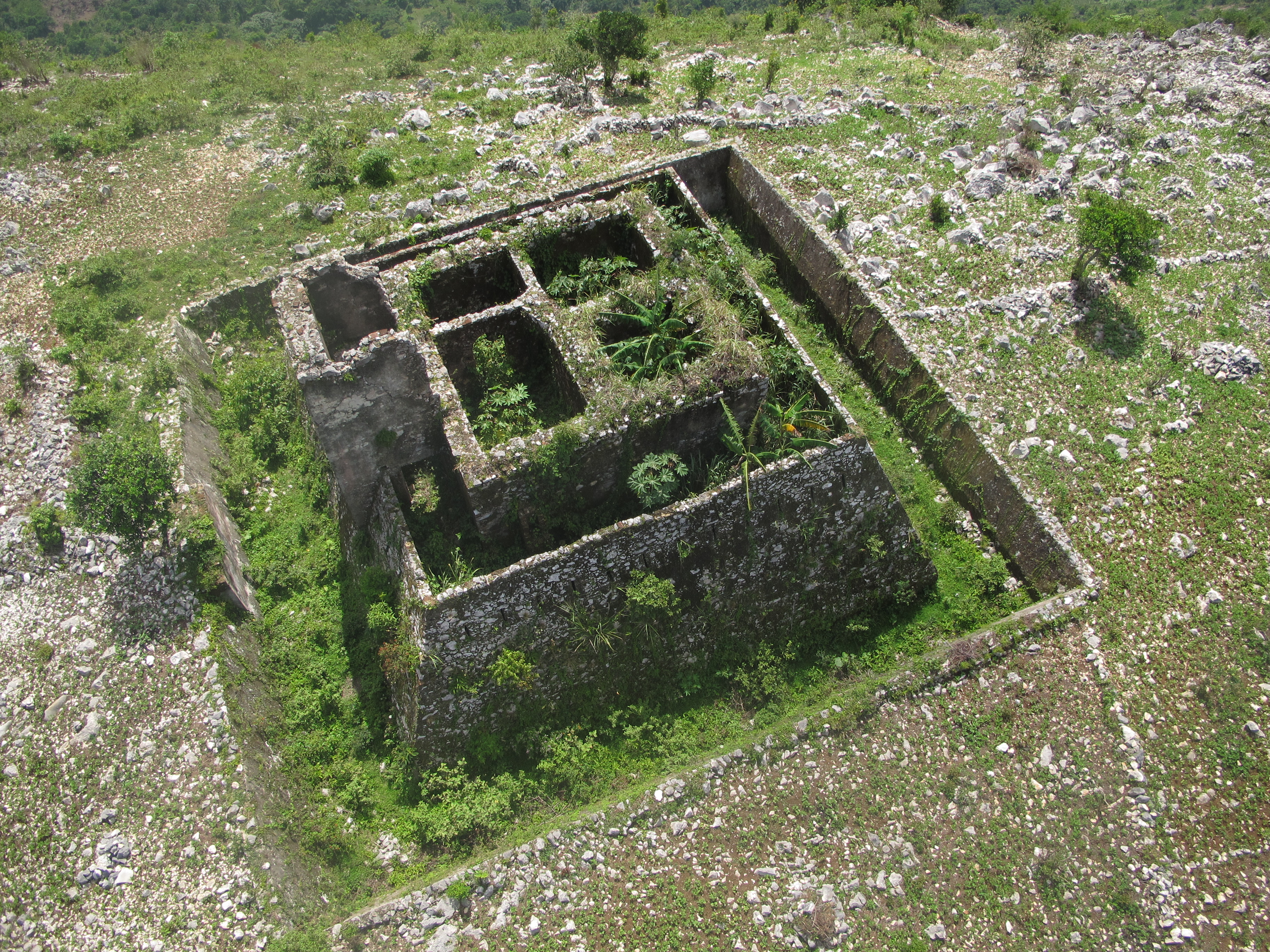
Buildings of Ramiers

== See also ==
- Visa policy of Haiti
- Economy of Haiti

== Notes ==
- Yarrington, Landon. 2009. "From Sight to Site to Website: Travel-Writing, Tourism, and the American Experience in Haiti, 1900-2008." M.A. thesis, Department of Anthropology, College of William and Mary.
