= 2020 Royal Chapel of Milot fire =

Church fire in Milot, Haiti

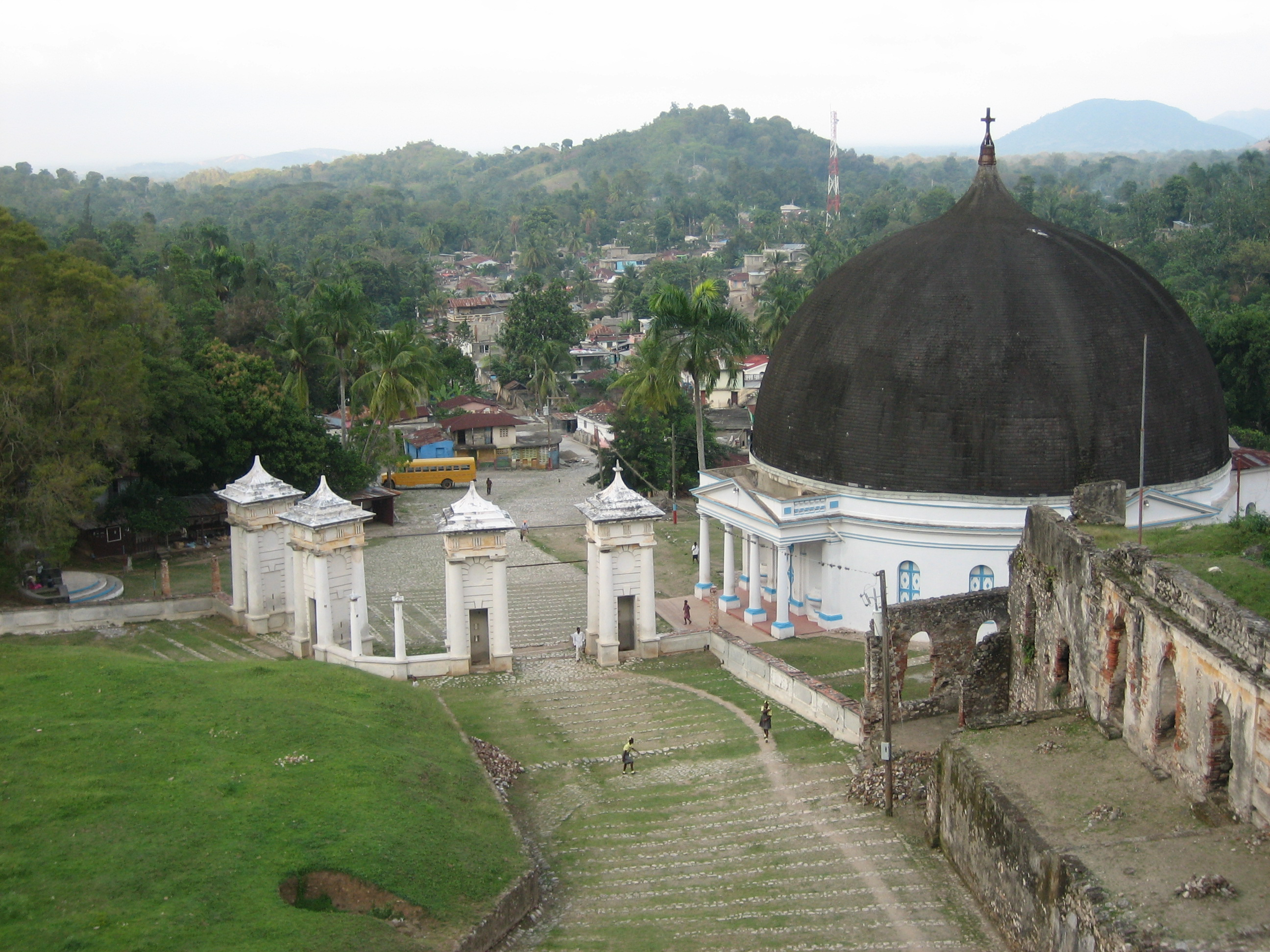
- The Royal Chapel of Milot in 2007
- 19°37′0″N 72°13′0″W
- Date: 12 April 2020; 6 years ago
- Time: 03:00 AM
- Duration: 6 hours
- Venue: Sans-Souci Palace/Royal Chapel of Milot
- Location: Milot, Haiti; 19°37′0″N 72°13′0″W
- Cause: Unknown
- Deaths: 0
- Injuries: 0
- Property damage: Roof and spire destroyed; windows and vaulted ceilings damaged

On April 12, 2020, at 3 AM, a structure fire broke out beneath the roof of the Royal Chapel cathedral in Milot, Haiti. By the time firefighters arrived to stop the fire from spreading, the dome of the cathedral had collapsed. The dome collapsed, causing the loss but no deaths or injuries.

According to Bishop Alain Prophète and Director Patrick Durandis, some things inside of the building were lost. There was no electricity in the neighborhood the night of the fire.

According to government officials, it will take time to build the Royal Chapel of Milot like it was before under the leadership of King Henri Christophe, but UNESCO offered help.

== Church background ==
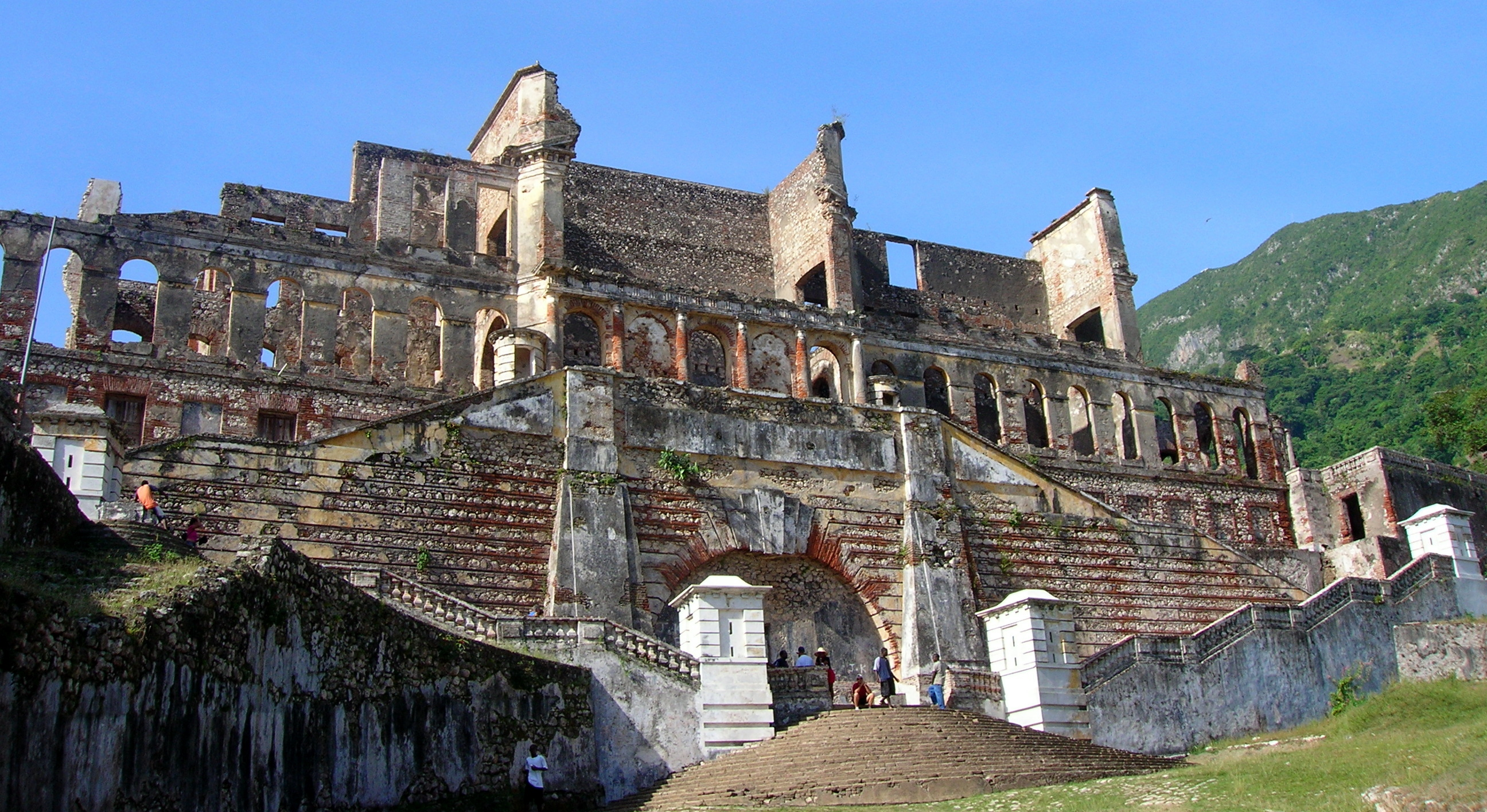
Sans-Souci Palace

King Henri Christophe had Our Lady of the Immaculate Conception built by Joseph Chery Warlock. The construction took place from 1810-1813. It is located at the entry to the Sans-Souci Palace, in the town of Milot, Nord, about 5 kilometers (3.1 mi) northeast of the Citadelle Laferrière, and 13 kilometers (8.1 mi) southwest of the Three Bays Protected Area.

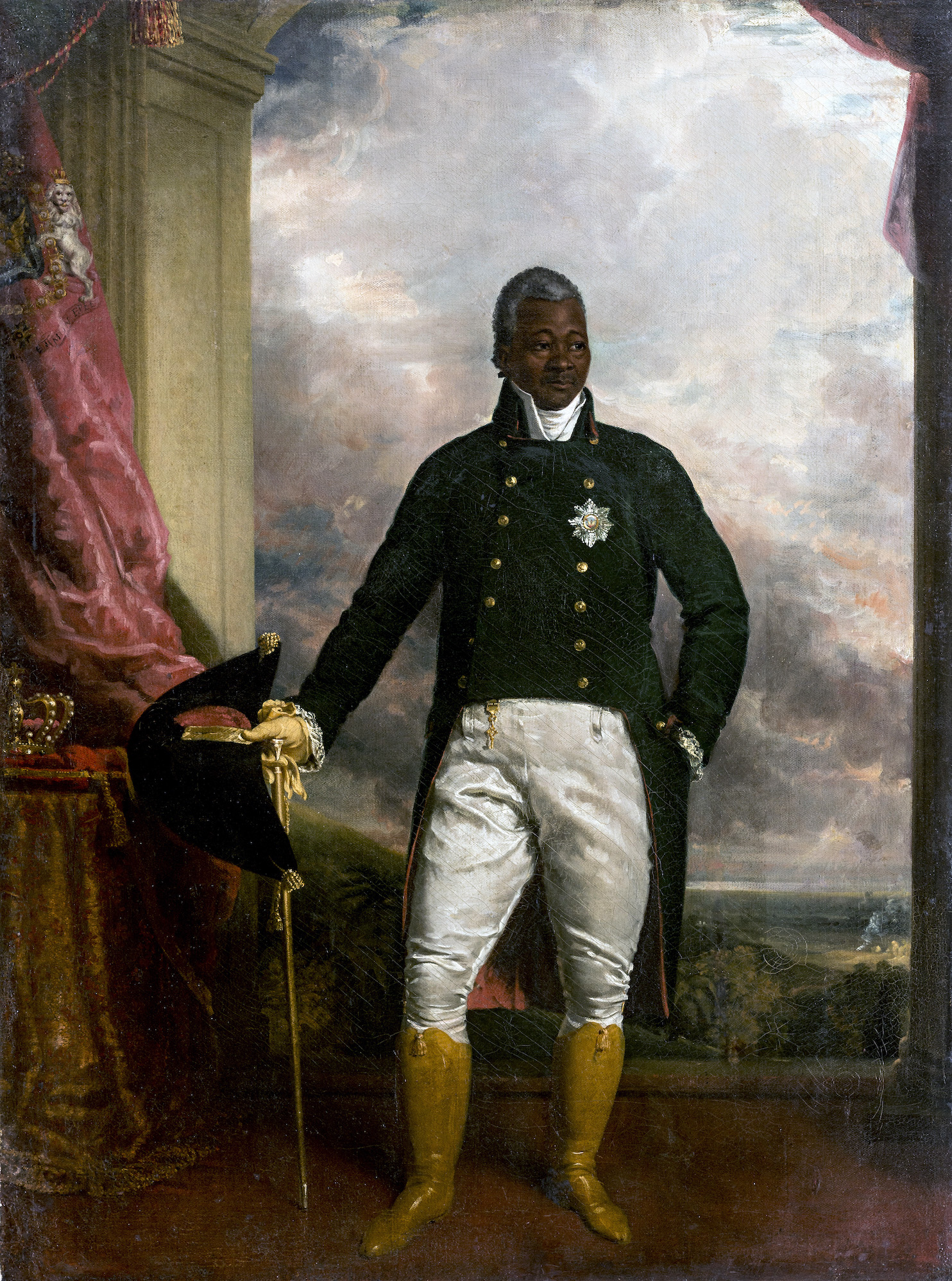
King, Henri Christophe

The Sans-Souci Palace was the royal residence. Henri I lived there with his wife, Queen Marie-Louise, and their two daughters. It was the most important structure the king had built (including nine other palaces, fifteen castles, numerous forts, and sprawling summer homes on his twenty plantations.

Before Sans-Souci was built, Milot used to be a French plantation that Christophe managed for a period during the Haitian Revolution. Under his administration, the palace was the site of opulent feasts and dances. It had beautiful arts, immense gardens, artificial springs, and a system of waterworks. Though Sans-Souci is now an empty place, at the time its splendor was noted by many foreign visitors. One American physician even remarked that it had "the reputation of having been one of the most magnificent edifices of the West Indies."

Citadelle Laferrière is located in the northern department of Haiti and the palace is surrounded by mountains and the surrounding area is very rich in trees. The oldest palace is now a tourist attraction visited by people from around the world.

A severe earthquake in 1842 destroyed a considerable part of the palace and devastated the nearby city of Cap-Haïtien; the palace was never rebuilt. The dome of the chapel, which collapsed during the earthquake, was rebuilt in 1970 by Haitian architect Albert Mangonès. The palace (before its destruction) was acknowledged by many to be the Caribbean equivalent of the Palace of Versailles in France.

UNESCO designated it—and the Citadelle—World Heritage Sites in 1982.

== Fire ==
The roof was already destroyed by the fire before firefighters arrived at the scene.

According to Jacques Bernadin, the Mayor of Milot, the firefighters of the town hall of Cap-Haitien arrived on the scene two hours after being alerted, but it was too late.

=== Reactions ===
After the fire destroyed the church, Bishop Alain Prophète, Director Patrick Durandis lamented the neglect of cultural monuments and the youth demanded an investigation as well.

- "This church is the pride of Milot. It’s the pride of the North. It’s the pride of Haiti." -Alain Prophète, Bishop.
- "Saturday and Sunday, there was no electricity in Milot so I find it hard to understand that the dome of the church caught fire. We cannot say that it is a short circuit: it has to be investigated right away. Even the park was closed due to the coronavirus epidemic, it is hard to understand." -Patrick Durandis, Director

== Investigation ==
Days after the fire had destroyed the building, the national government asked officials in Milot to investigate the cause of the fire.
