= Jean-Baptiste Sans Souci =

Haitian revolutionary

Jean-Baptiste Sans-Souci was a leader of rebel slaves during the Haitian Revolution. He was executed by rival black rebel leader, Henri Christophe, in 1803, shortly before Haiti won its independence. Sans-Souci is notable as one of the most effective military leaders during the revolution, particularly against French forces led by Charles Leclerc in 1802 and 1803.

== History ==
Sans-Souci, as well as many of his followers, were "Bossales", slaves born in Africa. People from west-central Africa were referred to as "Congos" in Saint-Domingue, although they were not necessarily of Kongo ethnicity.

Gros, a local official in colonial Saint-Domingue, who was captured and held as a prisoner of war by the rebels, spent time in a rebel camp under Sans-Souci's command. He described the rebel commander as "a very bad subject", and wrote that he and other prisoners were treated poorly in the camp. Sans-Souci's forces were active in the northern province of Saint-Domingue. Aside from fighting, Sans-Souci's forces engaged in trade and other commercial activities, such as gathering salt near the town of Limonade.

It is thought that Sans-Souci who may have taken his name from the quartier near the parish of Grande Rivière where he first led troops in guerrilla fighting against the French in 1791.

== Revolution ==
After the abolition of slavery in Saint-Domingue and the ascent of Toussaint Louverture to the post of Governor, Sans-Souci became commander at Grand-Riviere in the northern plain. Louverture's appointment of Sans-Souci to this position showed that he had confidence in Sans-Souci's loyalty after the suppression of the Moyse revolt and with the threat of French invasion looming.

Sans-Souci participated, under the command of Toussaint Louverture, in the resistance when French forces led by Napoleon's brother-in-law, Leclerc, arrived in the colony in 1802. Many in the colony believed that Napoleon and Leclerc were planning to reestablish slavery, despite claims made to the contrary. Sans-Souci would later describe his troops as "defenders of liberty". When Leclerc used French reinforcements to launch an offensive on the northern plain in early April 1802, many were killed by the rebels. One hundred of them were captured by Sans-Souci and sent to Toussaint Louverture.

== Revolution aftermath ==
After the surrender of Toussaint Louverture and other high-ranking Saint-Domingue generals like Henri Christophe and Dessalines to Leclerc, Sans-Souci was among those who continued to fight the French. Like the other black military leaders in Saint-Domingue, however, Sans-Souci eventually made peace with Leclerc in June 1802. In July, however, Leclerc secretly ordered Sans-Souci's arrest, suspecting him of plotting a rebellion. But before he could be arrested Sans-Souci defected back to the rebel side. Along with other rebel leaders like Macaya and Va-Malheureux, Sans-Souci soon controlled much of northern Saint-Domingue's mountainous regions. The rebel forces in the mountains defeated French attacks against them and launched hit-and-run raids on the plains below.

Sans-Souci emerged as one of the most skilled rebel leaders, successfully using guerrilla-style military tactics that were common in the wars of his homeland. In one September 1802 French attack against Sans-Souci, Leclerc lost 400 French soldiers. Other colonial troops fighting for the French were thought to have deserted to the rebels during the battle "after having killed their" commander.

Besides the French troops commanded by Leclerc, Sans-Souci and other rebels also fought against local soldiers led by black generals like Dessalines and Henri Christophe who had gone over to Leclerc's side. By early 1803, however, most of the major black and mixed-race generals in Saint-Domingue had begun to defect back to the rebel side. Tensions mounted among rebel forces when the generals who had collaborated with the French sought to establish their authority over those, like Sans-Souci, who had been fighting the French all along.

Sans-Souci, in particular, was hostile to Henri Christophe. When Christophe was fighting on the French side, he had led forces against Sans-Souci. Sans-Souci was unwilling to take orders from his former enemy. Other rebel leaders, including Dessalines, sought to resolve the conflict, and Sans-Souci seems to have agreed to accept Christophe's authority. Nonetheless, Christophe decided to dispose of his rival, and invited Sans-Souci to a meeting, where he was assassinated on Christophe's orders. Later, as king of northern Haiti, Christophe built a luxurious palace called Sans-Souci. Its name may have been chosen, in part, in an attempt "to erase the memory" of his deceased rival.
