= National History Park =

National park in Haiti

- Pak nasyonal istorik - Sitadèl, Sansousi, Ramye; Parc national historique Citadelle Sans-Souci Ramiers
- IUCN category IV (habitat/species management area)
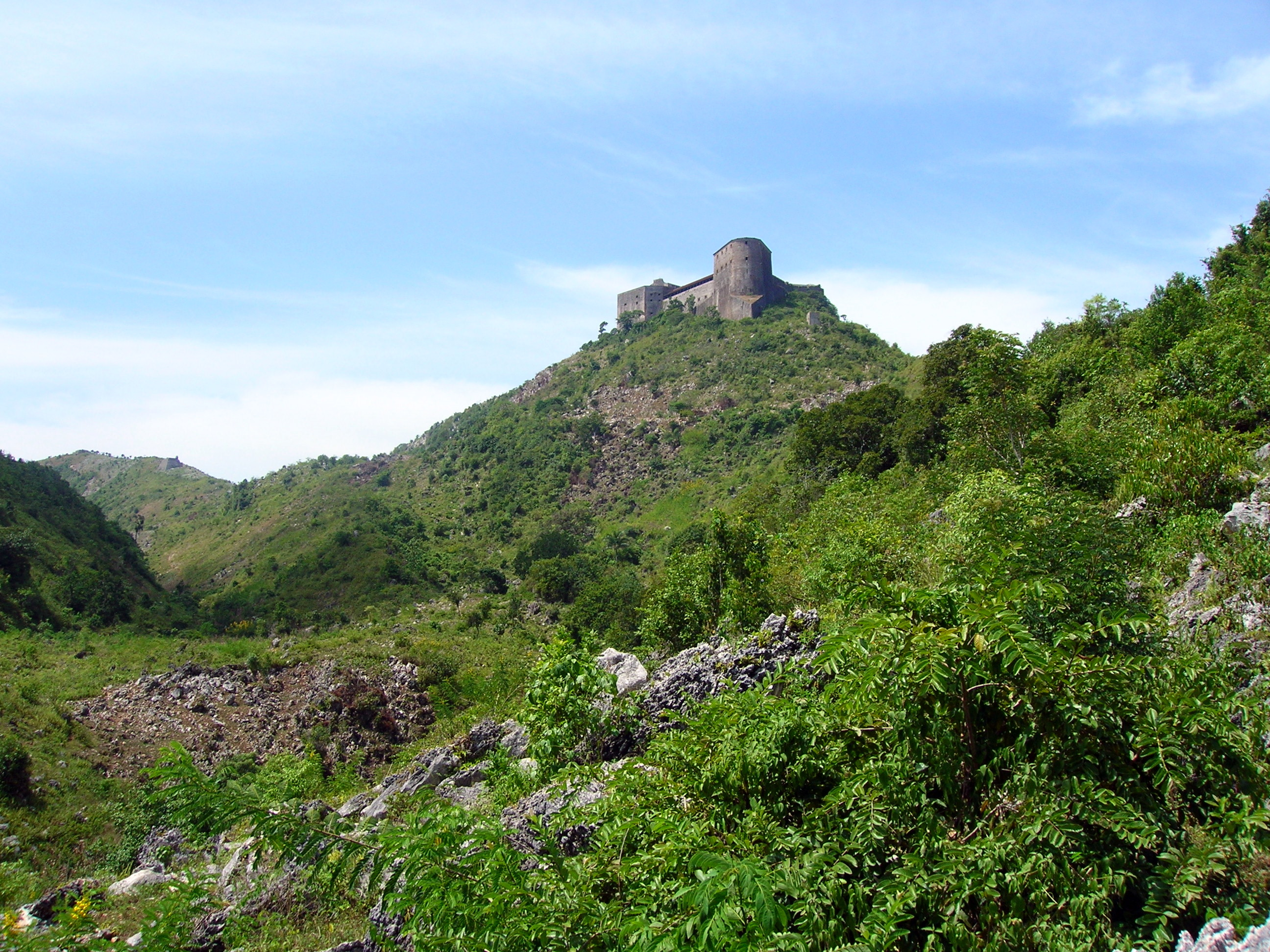

- Location within Haiti
- Location: Haiti
- Coordinates: 19°34′25″N 72°14′39.1″W
- Area: 25.28 km^{2} (9.76 sq mi)
- Established: 1968

National History Park (Haitian Creole: Pak nasyonal istorik, French: Parc national historique) is a national park in Haiti established on 1968. It is located in Milot. It was declared as a UNESCO World Heritage Site in 1982.

The park consists mainly of the ruins of the Sans-Souci Palace, the Citadelle Laferrière and the buildings at Ramiers.

== Gallery ==
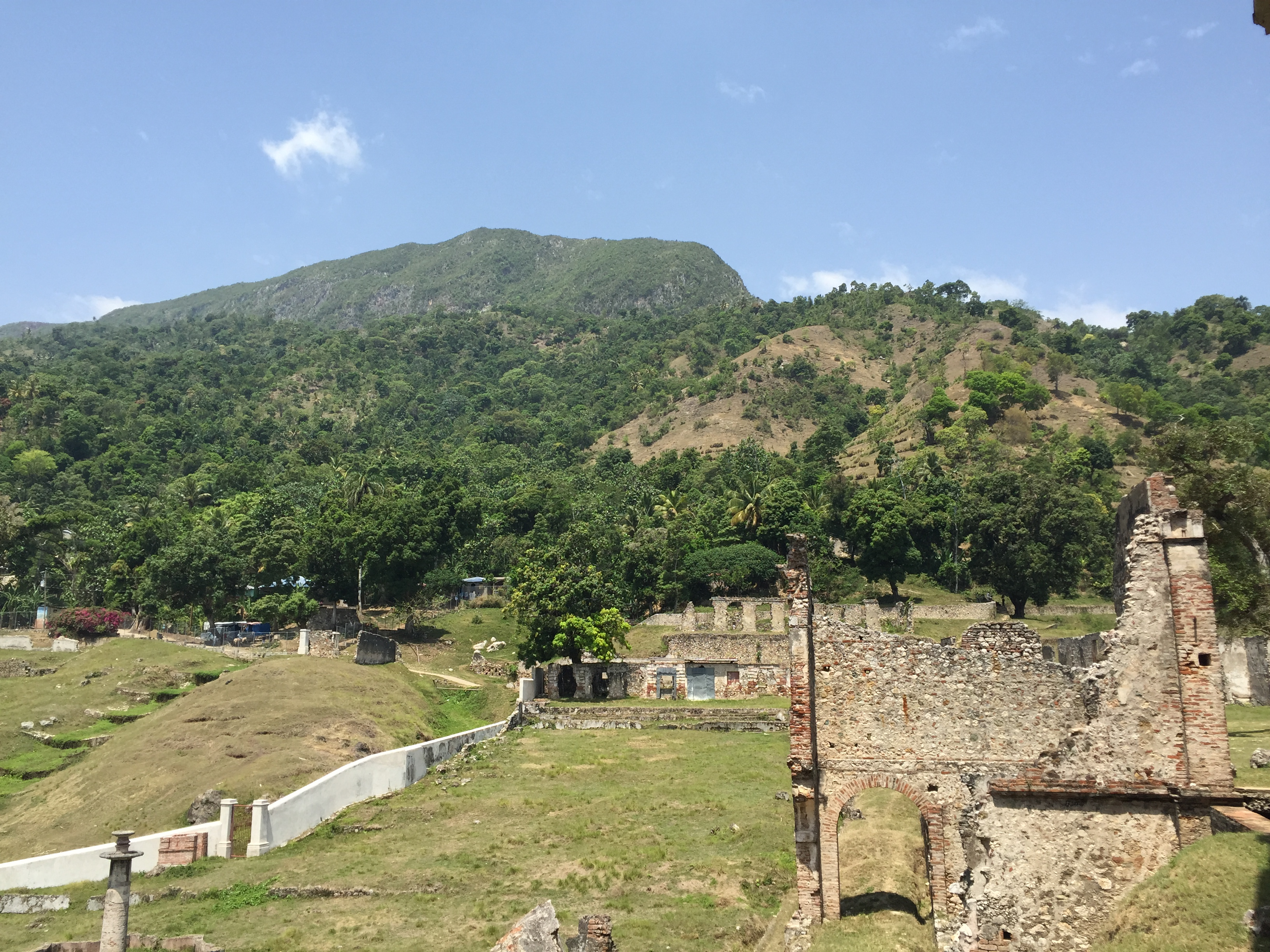
National History Park

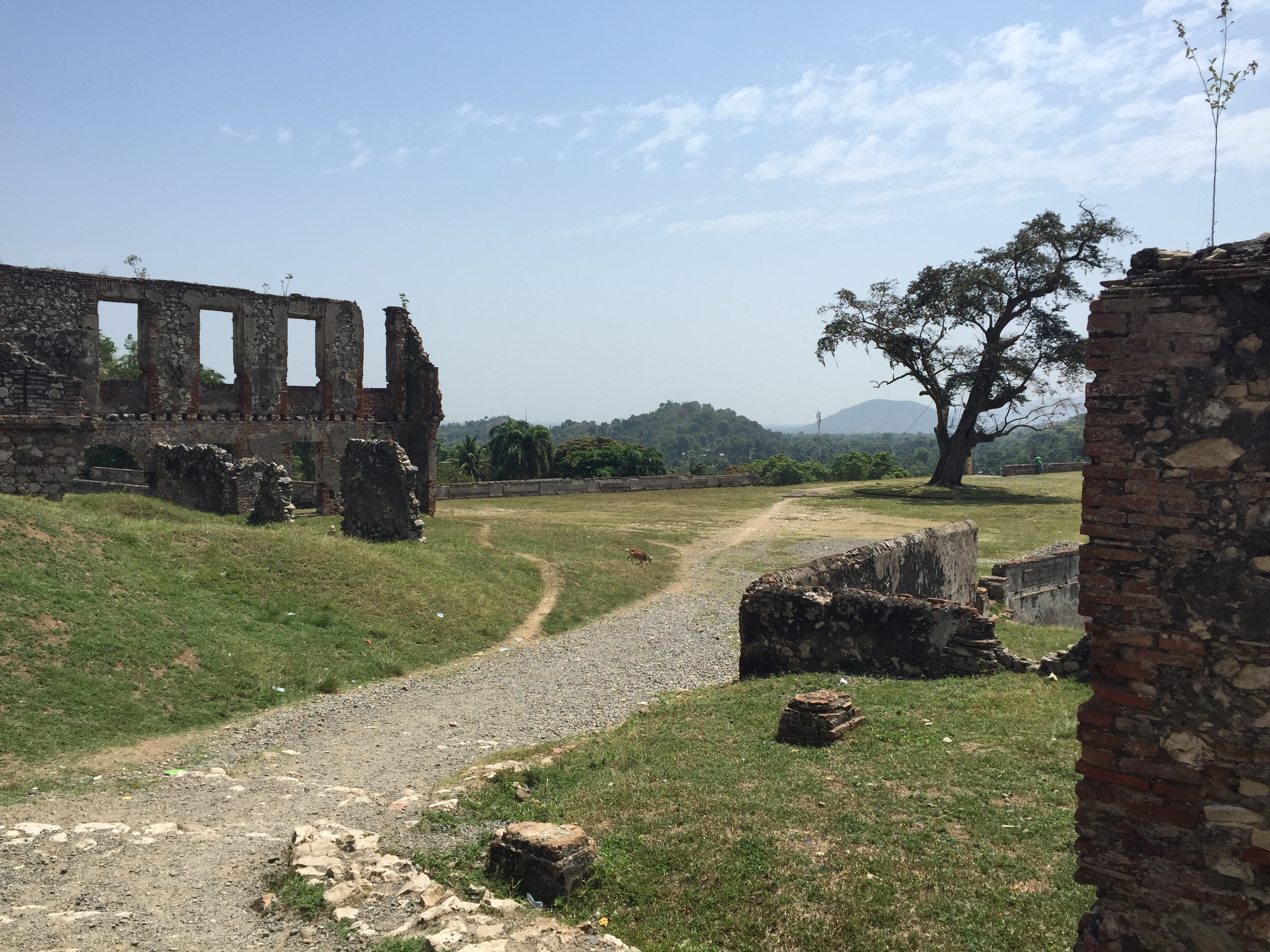
National History Park

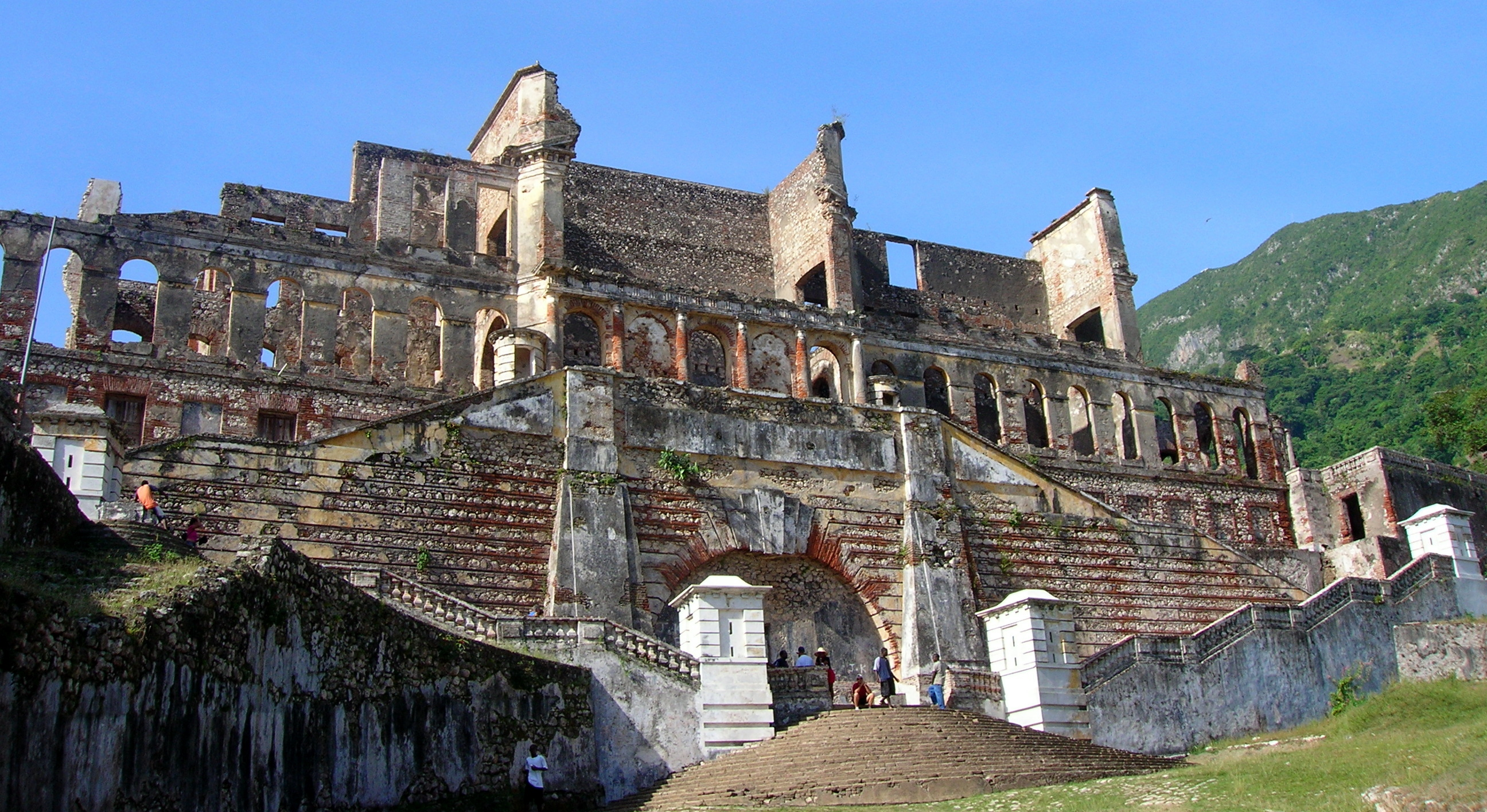
Sans-Souci Palace

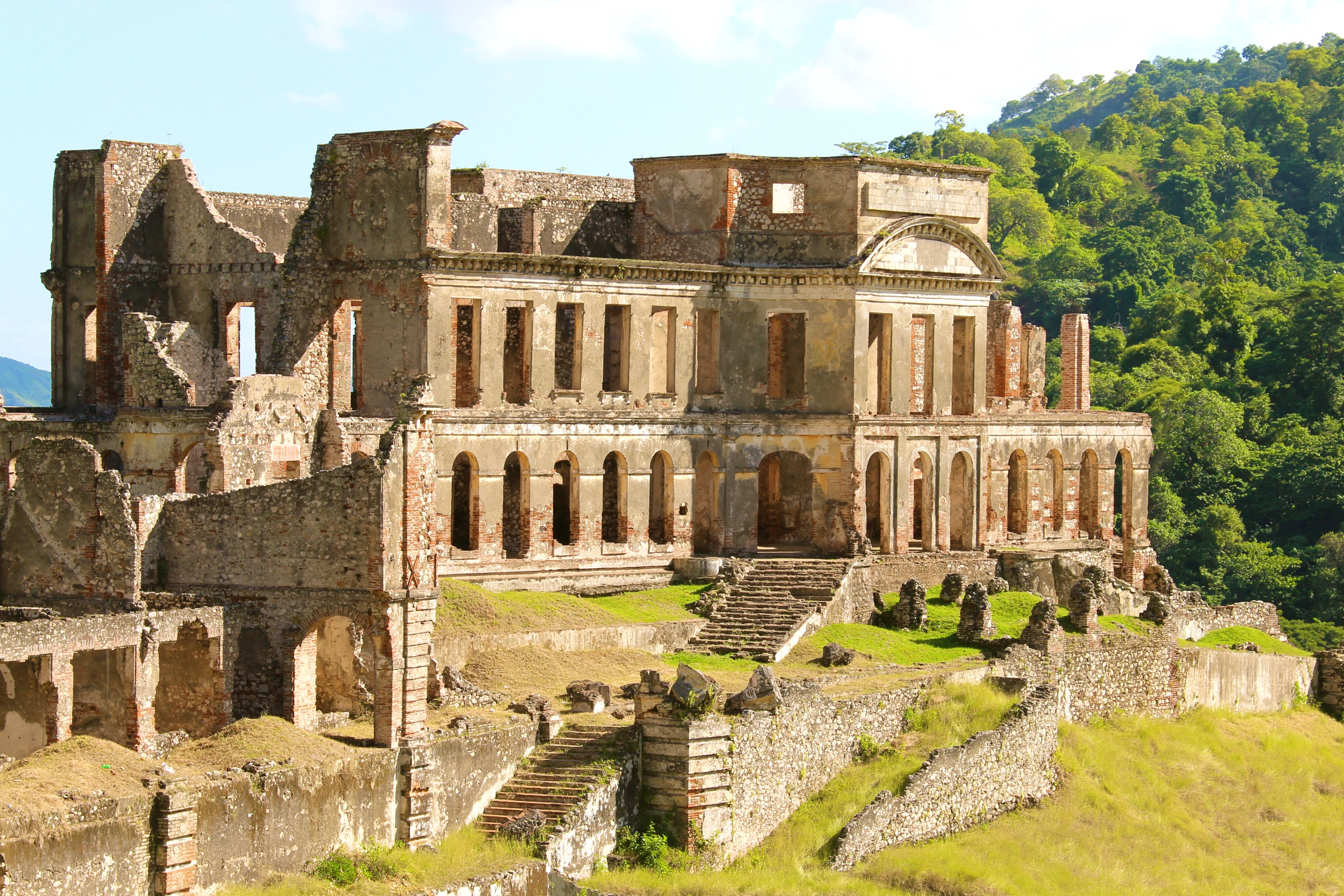
Sans-Souci Palace

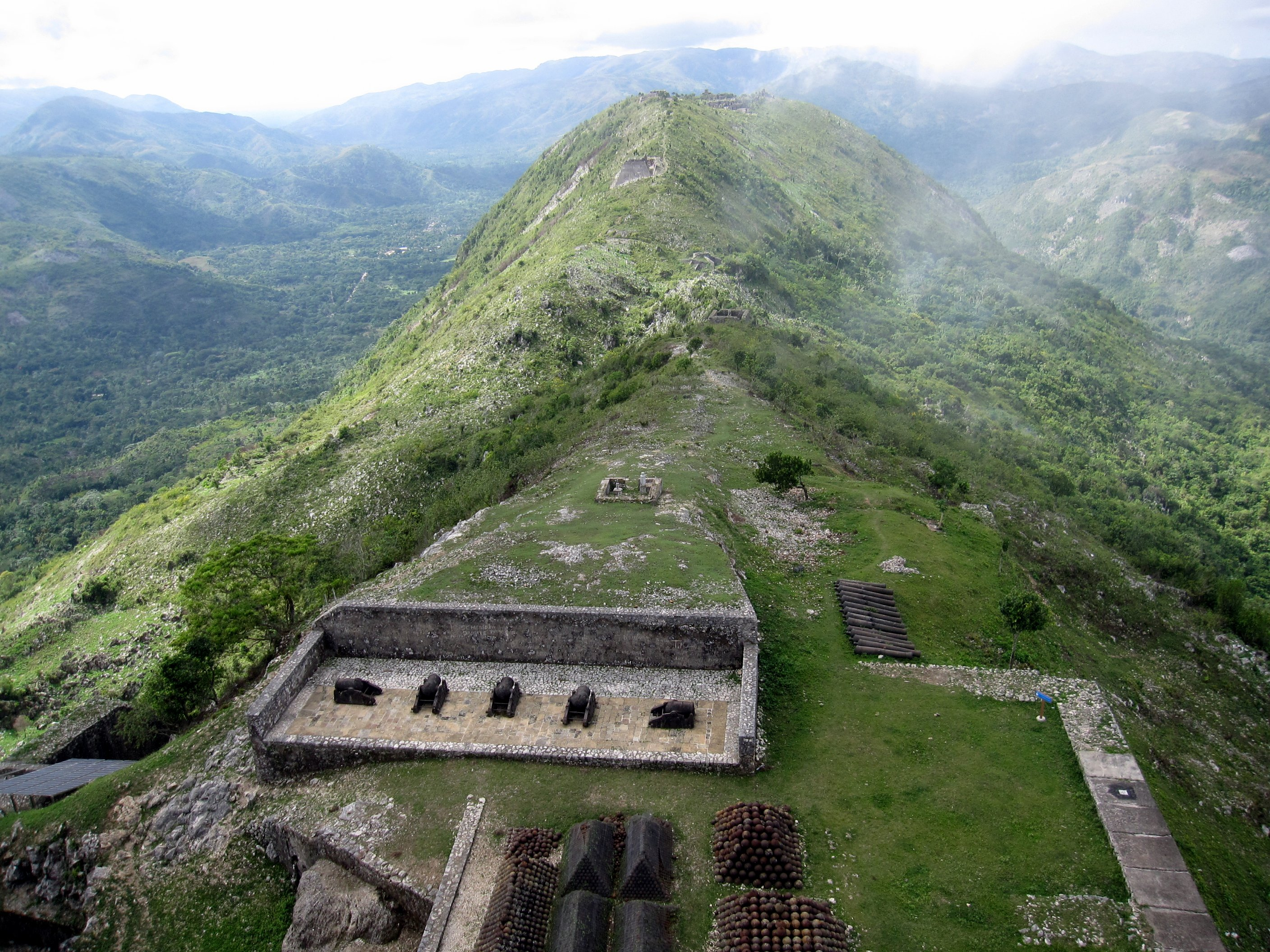
Citadelle Laferrière

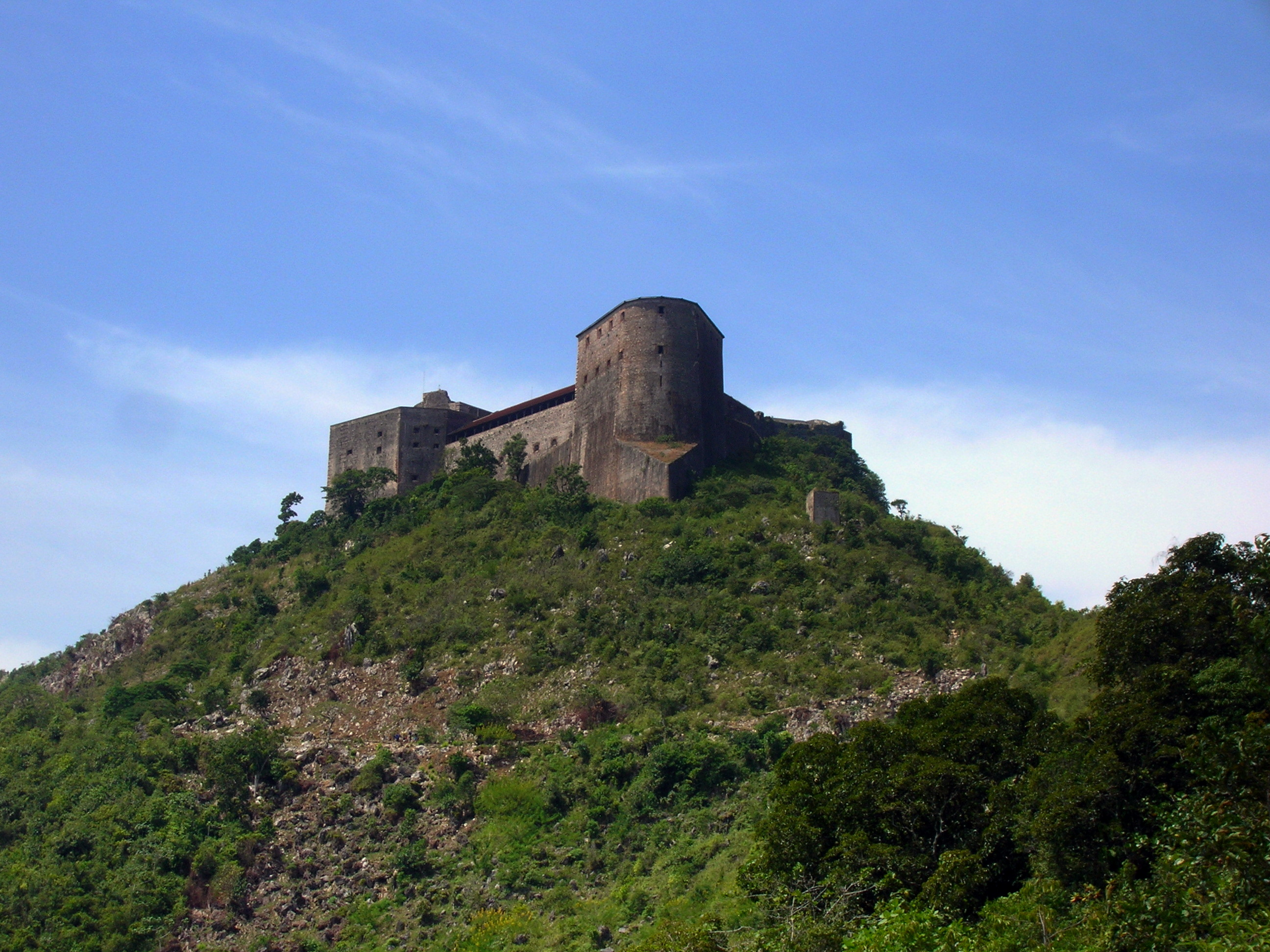
Citadelle Laferrière

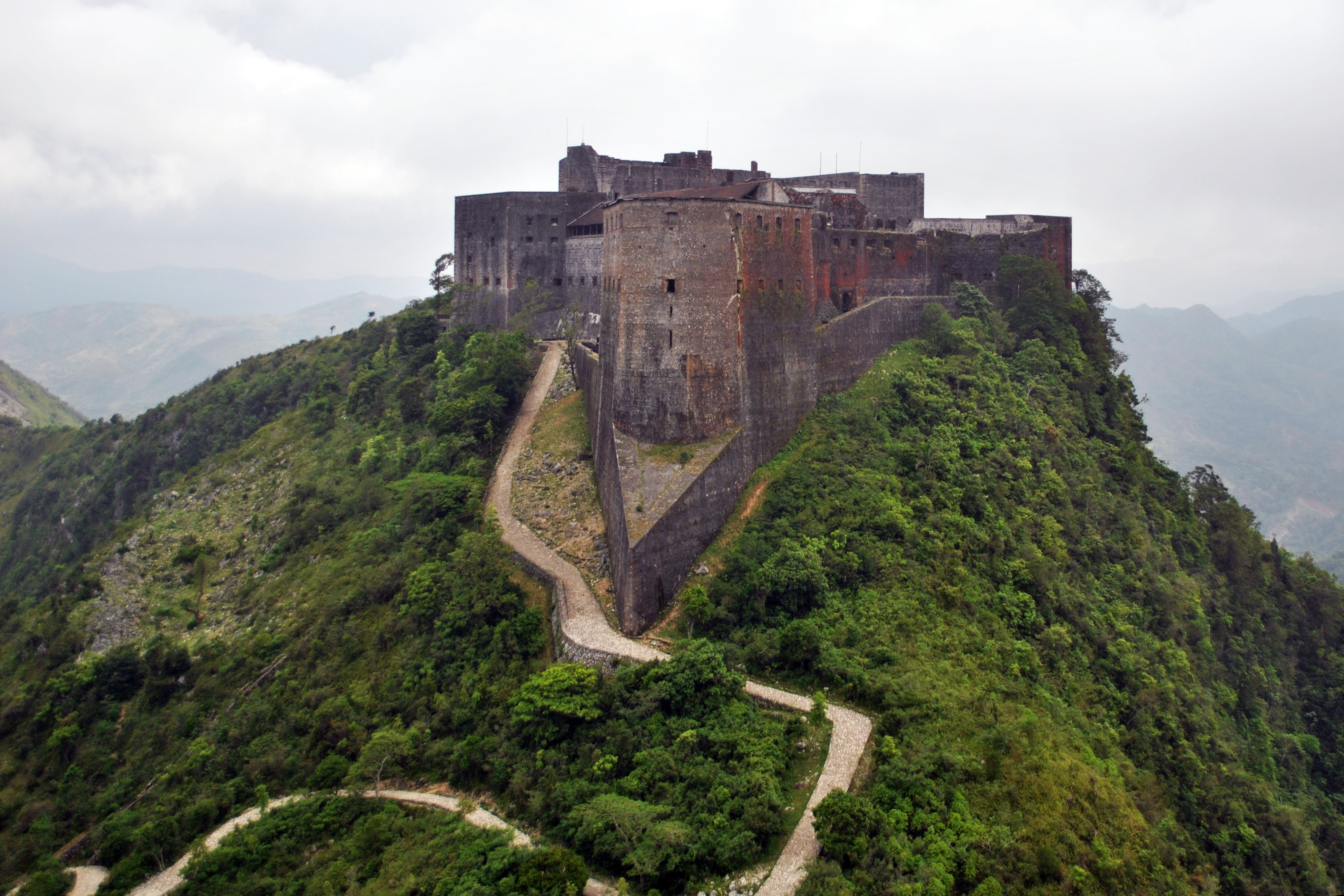
Citadelle Laferrière

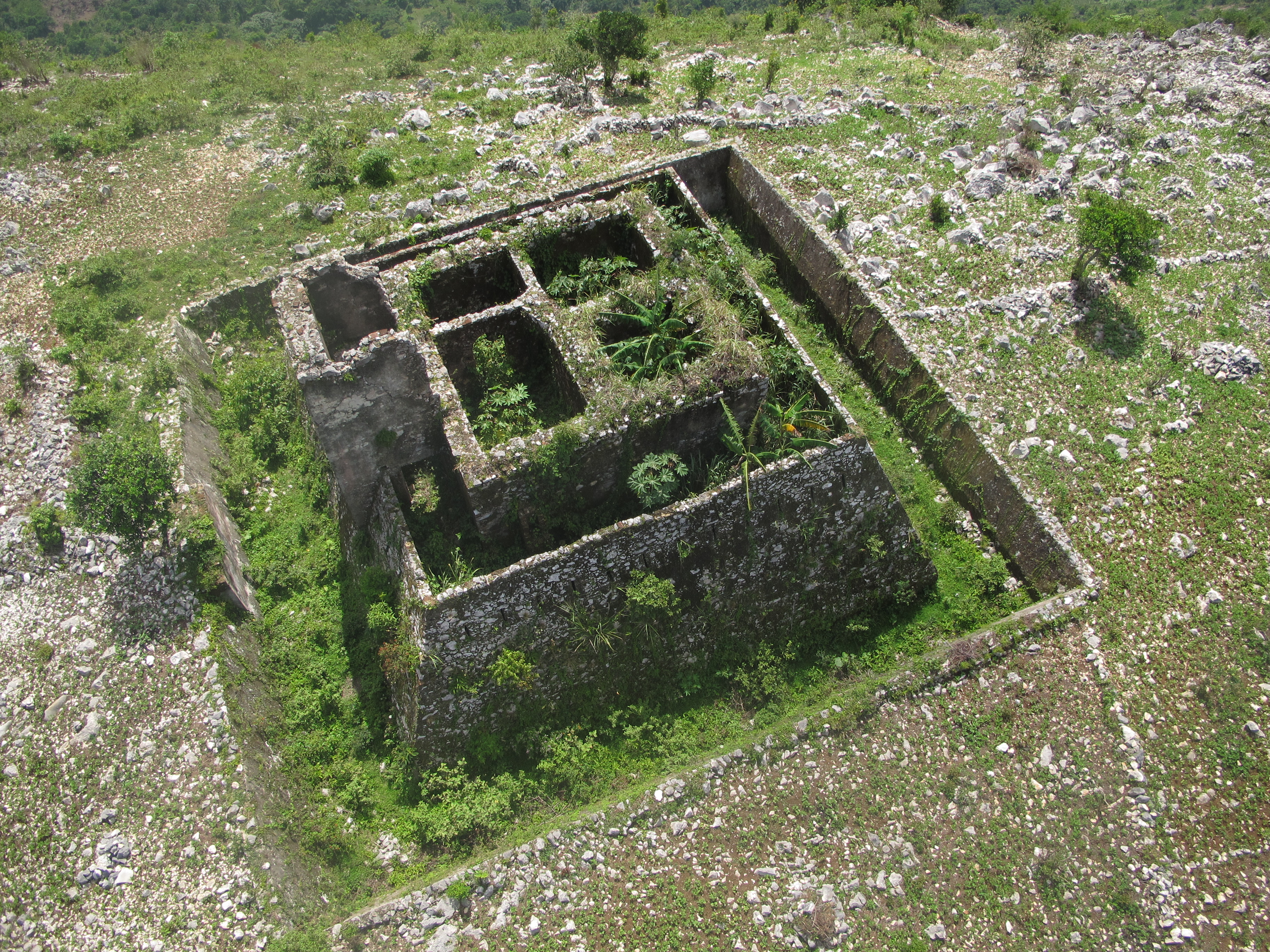
The Ramiers

== See also ==
- List of national parks of Haiti
