= Sans-Souci Palace =

Historic building in Milot, Haiti; royal residence of Henri Christophe (King Henry I)

Palace of Sans-Souci
- Palais Sans Souci (French)
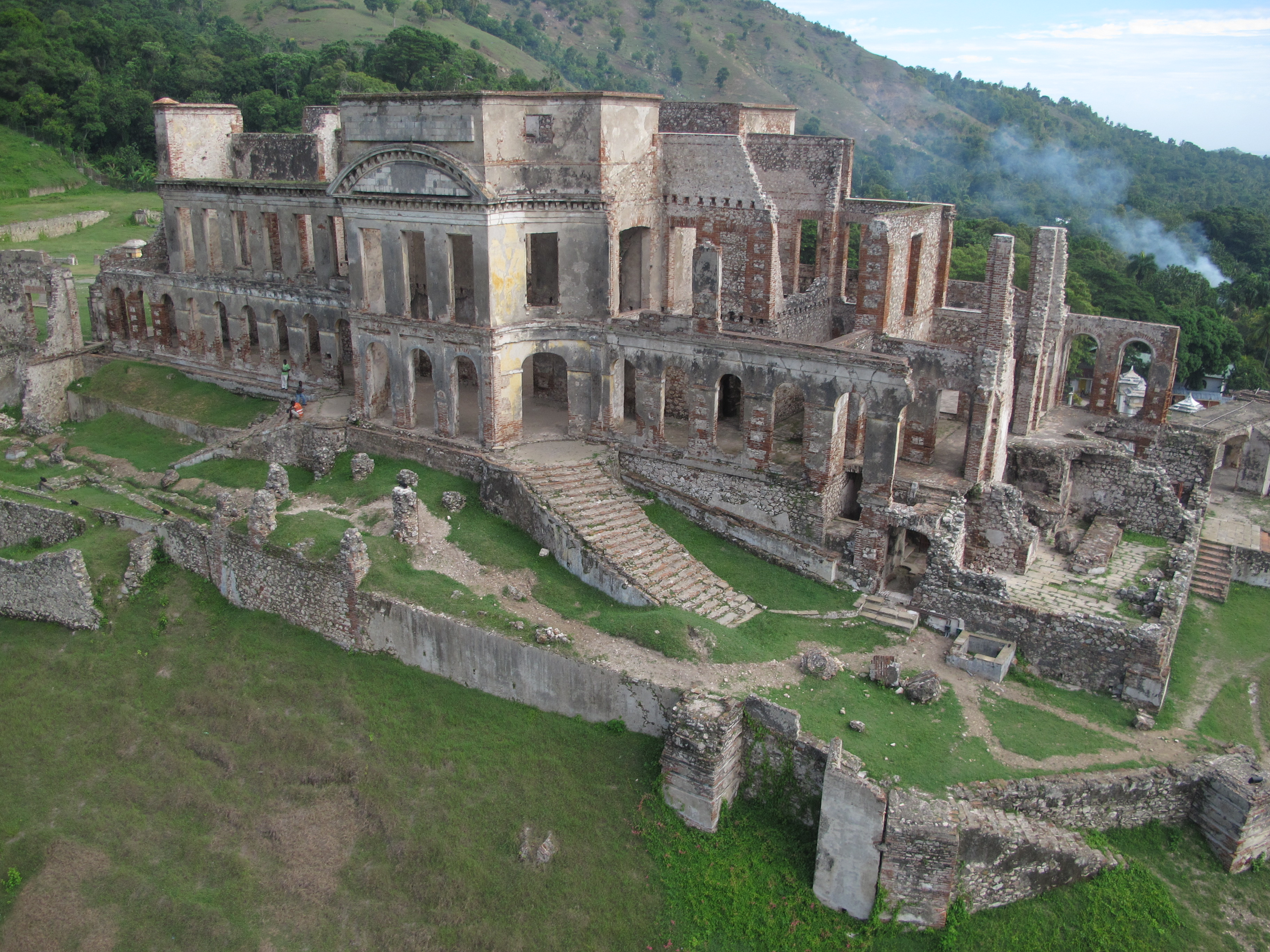
- Aerial view of the palace ruins

- Location within Haiti
- 19.604692°N 72.218596°W
- Location: Milot, Haiti

History
- Built: 1813
- Built for: Henry I, King of Haiti
- Demolished: 1842 (earthquake)

Site notes
- Architect: Pompée Valentin Vastey
- Architectural style: Baroque

UNESCO World Heritage Site
- Official name: National History Park - Citadel, Sans Souci, Ramiers
- Designated: 1982 (6th session)
- Reference no.: 180
- Region: Latin America and the Caribbean

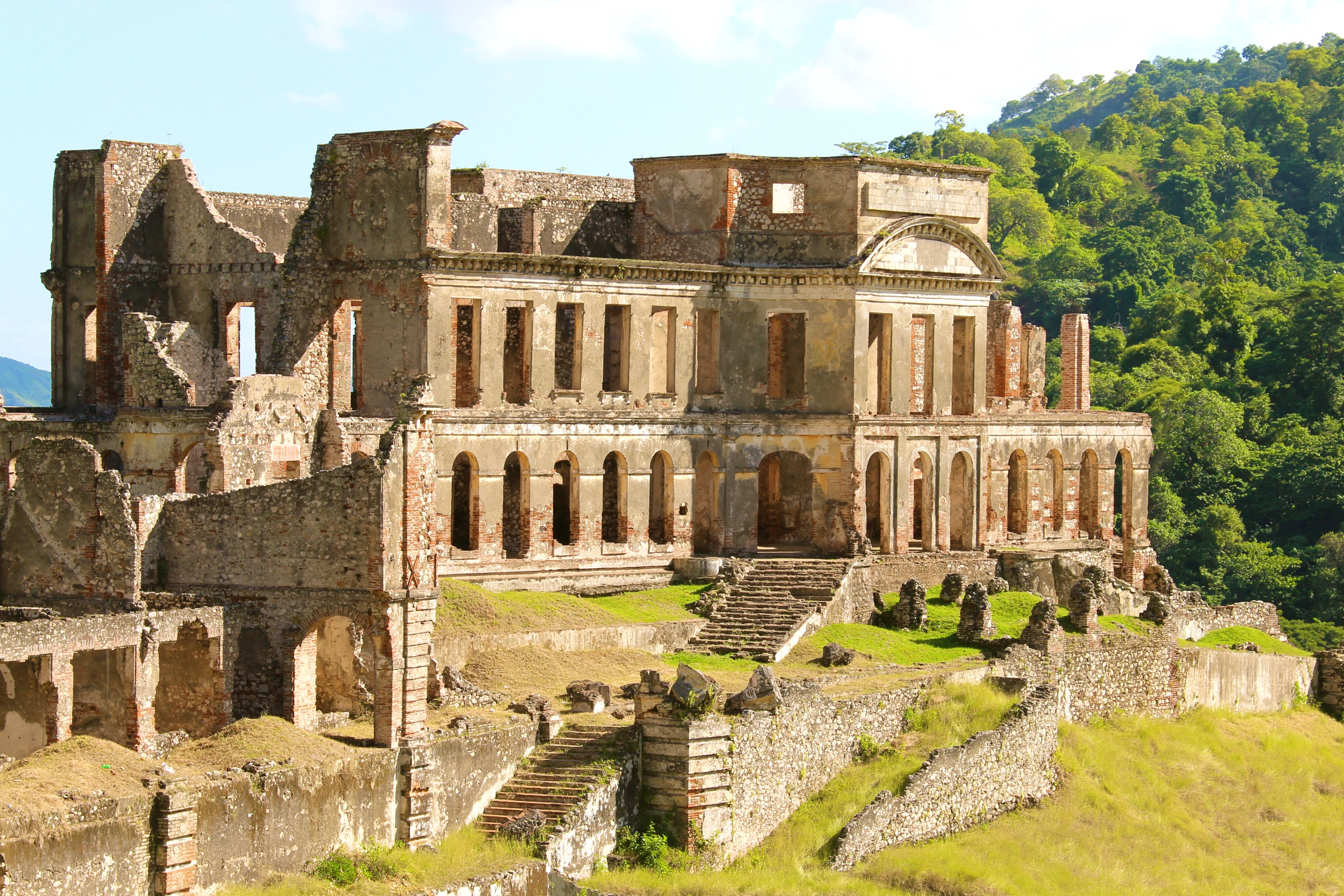
Sans-Souci Palace, National History Park, Haiti.

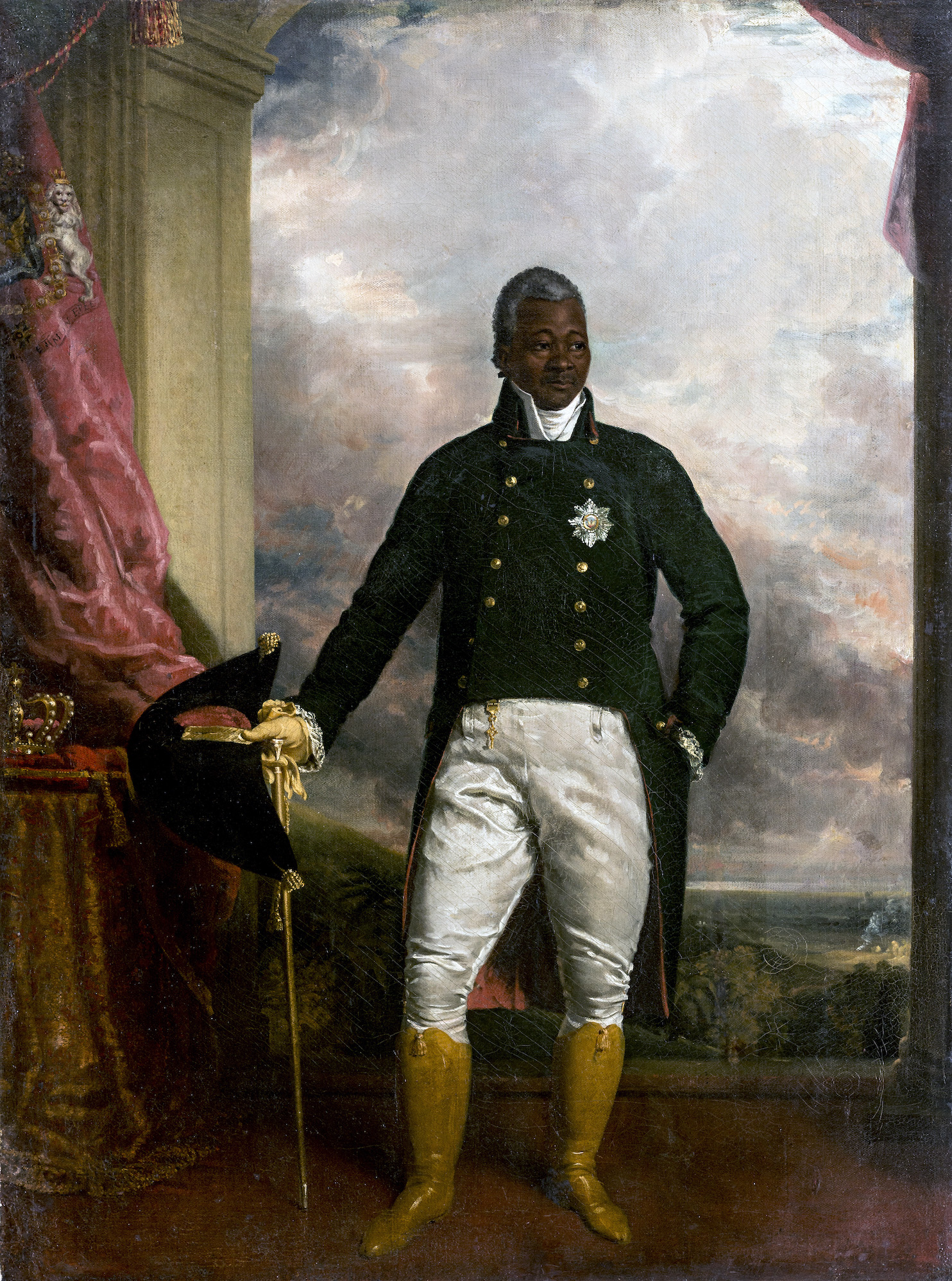
King Henri Christophe I by Richard Evans, c. 1816

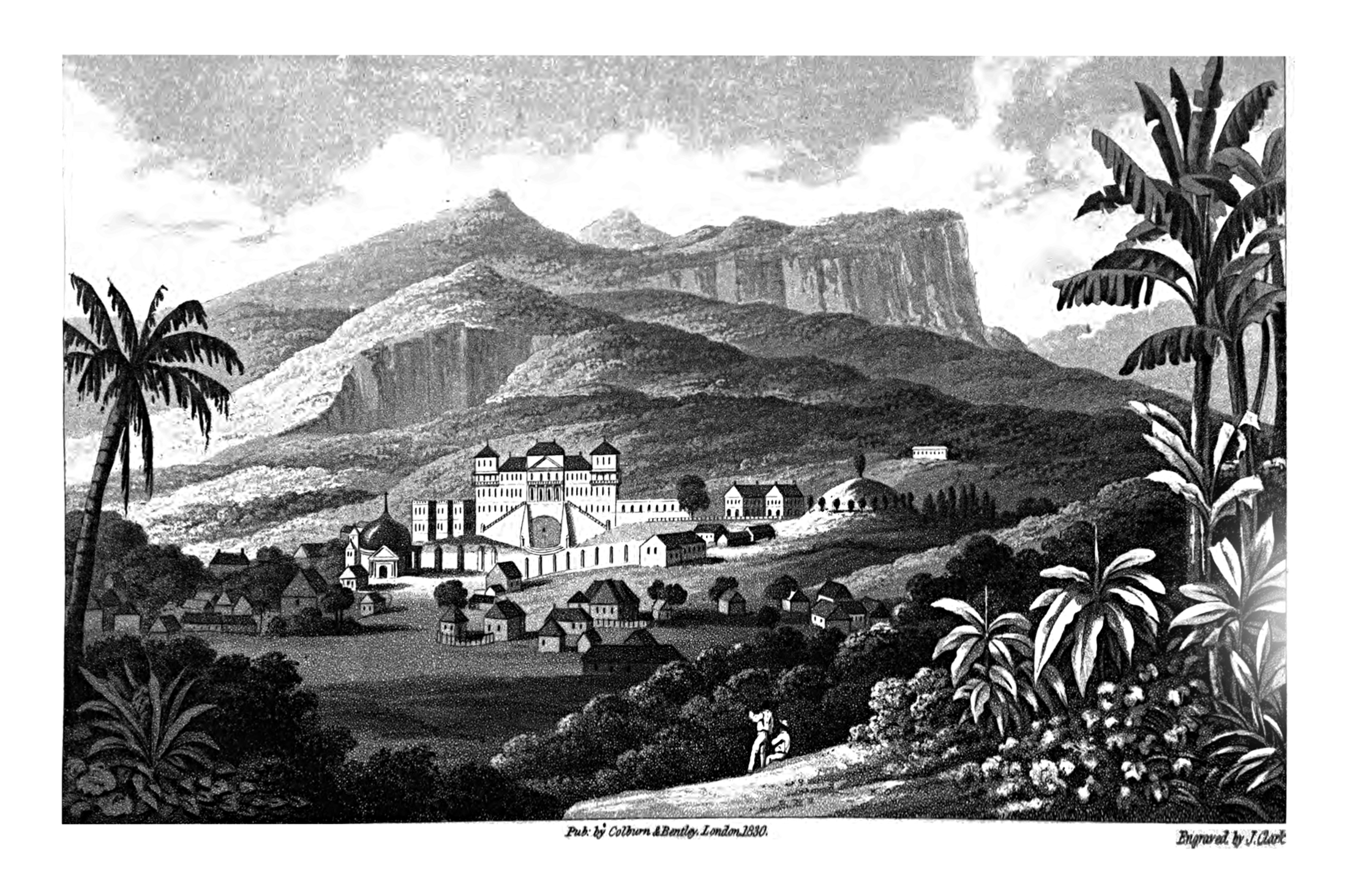
Sans-Souci Palace in 1836.

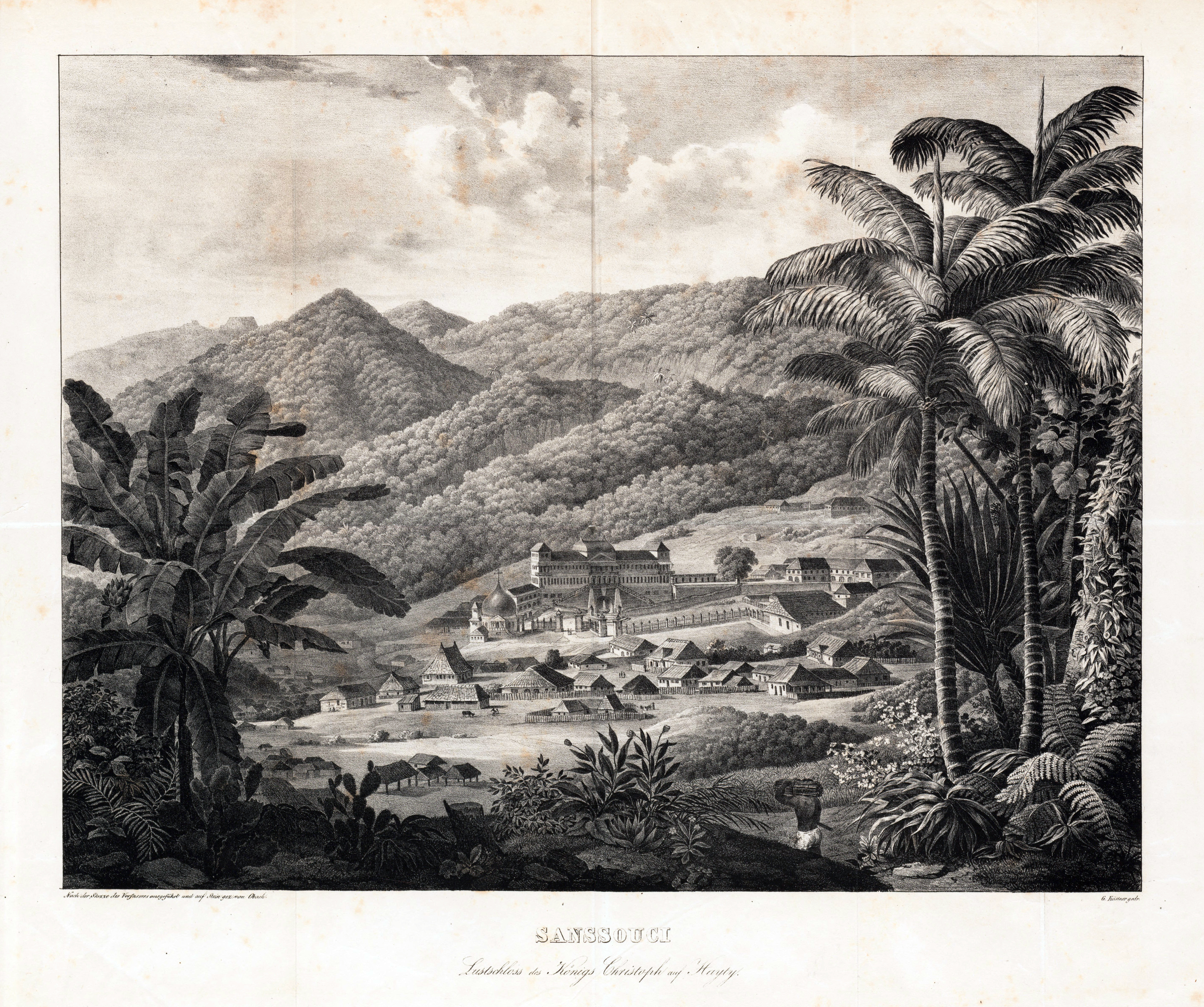
Sans Souci. Castle of King Christopher of Haiti, lithograph by Gottfried Küstner (1800–1864) from a work by Carl Ritter, published in 1836.

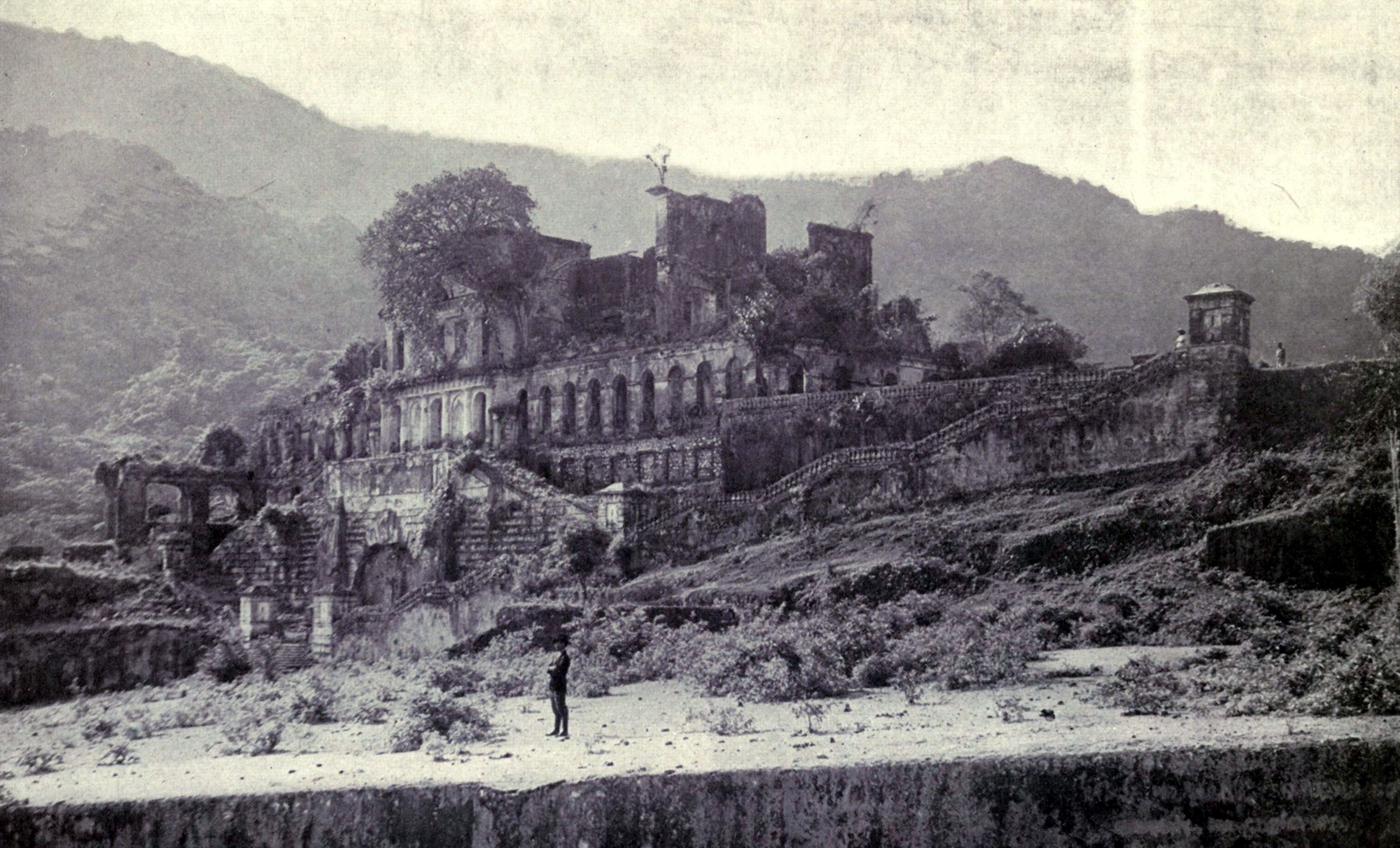
Sans-Souci Palace in 1907.

The Palace of Sans-Souci, or Sans-Souci Palace (French: Palais Sans Souci [palɛ sɑ̃ susi]), was the principal royal residence of Henry I, King of Haiti, better known as Henri Christophe. It is located in the commune of Milot, approximately five kilometres (3 mi) northeast of the Citadelle Laferrière, and thirteen kilometres (8 mi) southwest of the Three Bays Protected Area. Being among the first buildings constructed in a free Haiti after the Haitian Revolution, the Palace and the neighboring Citadelle, are Haitian icons and global symbols of liberty, and were inscribed on the World Heritage List in 1982.

== History ==
=== Name ===
The palace's name, French for "carefree", is shared with the loyal Haitian Revolution military leader Jean-Baptiste Sans Souci, who was executed by Henri Christophe in 1803. The name is also shared with Sanssouci Potsdam, Frederick the Great's palace in Potsdam, Germany. It is additionally shared with the San Souci Estate in Grenada, where Cristophe had been enslaved prior to coming to Haiti.

When Henri Christophe and other military leaders split from the French, they asked Sans Souci to join their ranks, but he declined and particularly viewed Christophe as a traitor. About ten years before the construction of his palace, the future Haitian king sent Colonel Sans Souci a conciliatory message inviting him to one of his headquarters at the main Grand Pré plantation, adjacent to the Milot plantation where he would later build the palace. When Sans Souci arrived, Christophe's guards bayoneted him and his small band of guards to death. Sans Souci Palace was built only a few yards away, or perhaps even exactly over, the place where Sans Souci the man was killed by Christophe.

=== Construction and abandonment ===
The palace was built between 1810 and 1813 by an undetermined number of workers.

The residence accommodated the king, Queen Marie-Louise and their children, along with their royal staff of advisors. It was the most important of nine palaces commissioned by the king, as well as fifteen châteaux, numerous forts, and sprawling summer homes on his twenty plantations. The nearest airport and large city is Cap-Haïtien.

Before the construction of Sans-Souci, Milot was a French plantation that Christophe managed for a period during the Haitian Revolution. Many of Henri Christophe's contemporaries noted his ruthlessness, and it is unknown how many laborers died during the palace's construction. Under his reign, the palace was the site of opulent feasts and dances. It had immense gardens, artificial springs, and a system of waterworks. The site was formerly the area where Henri worked the fields for the French.

Though Sans-Souci is now an empty ruin, at the time its splendor was noted by many foreign visitors. One American physician remarked that it had "the reputation of having been one of the most magnificent edifices of the West Indies."

Henri Christophe faced difficulties in ruling his kingdom as rising discontent from plantation laborers and the elite who felt his reign was oppressive. After falling ill with a stroke in 1820, his weakness enraged rebellions against him. During a palace attack by enemies, he committed suicide. Shortly after, southern Republic took over his territory and San-Souci palace had been stripped from its valuables, and left abandoned.

Close to the palace is the renowned mountaintop fortress, the Citadelle Laferrière, built under a decree by Henri Christophe to repel a feared French invasion that never occurred. It is reached by continuing on the trail behind the palace.

Crippled by stroke on 15 August 1820, Henri committed suicide by shooting himself with a silver bullet on the grounds of the palace on 8 October 1820. He was subsequently buried in the Citadelle. His son and heir, Jacques-Victor Henry was bayoneted to death by revolutionaries ten days later.

A severe earthquake in 1842 destroyed a considerable part of the palace and devastated the nearby city of Cap-Haïtien; the palace was never rebuilt. The Church of Our Lady of the Immaculate Conception, next to the palace, was rebuilt and served as a parish church and tourist attraction until its destruction in a 2020 fire.

Due to the large earthquake, the San-Souci palace had further damage and breakage to sections of the palace. Following the incident, the ruins have mostly been neglected. Although some view the ruins as a symbol of the collapse of Christophe's kingdom, other perspectives exist. Others see the ruins of Sans-Souci is seen as a powerful historic symbol in Haiti. As it represents, resistance, freedom, and pride in their nation, despite slavery and colonization.

== Inspiration ==
Some scholars have also asked whether Christophe took part of his inspiration for the palace from the Prussian king Frederick the Great's palace in Potsdam, Sanssouci, a symbol of European Enlightenment achievement. Other scholars argue, the palace's architecture is inspired by Germain Boffrand's designs for the Château de la Malgrange for Leopold, Duke of Lorraine, near Nancy.

However, Haitian historian Michel-Rolph Trouillot argues that the link to Sans Souci-Potsdam is unfounded. Most early writers like Joanna Brown or Hubert Cole suggested German influence such as architectural style or that Henri Christophe actually had German engineers build it, but provided little to no sources. In fact, Haitian historian Vergniaud Leconte shows that it was Christophe’s military engineer, Henri Barre, who designed it. Haitian architect Patrick Delatour, who was involved in restoring Sans Souci-Milot, also insisted that it resembles French urban planning if anything, not German. Moreover, Trouillot notes that Austro-German geographer Karl Ritter, who visited Sans Souci-Milot eight days after Christophe’s death, describes it as “European” but not once suggests a link to Federick’s Sans Souci-Potsdam.

It is very likely that San Souci-Milot is directly related to Jean-Baptiste Sans Souci, one of the early rebel leaders and loyal officers to Louverture’s army. When the major black ranks of the rebel side (Toussaint Louverture, Henri Christophe, Jean-Jacques Dessalines) defected to the French army in 1802, Sans Souci remained loyal to the rebel cause and even fought against them. Because of this war within war, Sans Souci scorned Christophe in particular and did not recognize Christophe’s authority when he and the others returned to the rebel side. Christophe eventually killed Sans Souci, where the palace was likely built. Haitian historian Henock Trouillot suggests that Christophe built the palace exactly “to prove how solidly his power was implanted in this soil” by killing his enemy. Trouillot alludes to how Christopher's actions aligned with Dahoman oral narratives and that the Tacoodonou story inspired him to build a palace where he killed his enemy.

In any event, the palace' splendor was remarked upon by various visitors, generally acknowledged by many to be the Caribbean equivalent to the Palace of Versailles in France. Proud of its magnificence, the Palace of Sans-Souci was an important step in Henri Christophe's plan to demonstrate to foreigners, particularly Europeans and Americans, the power and capability of the black race. The African pride in the construction of the king's palace was captured by the comment of his advisor and architect, Pompée Valentin Vastey (Baron Valentin de Vastey), who said that the palace and its nearby church, "erected by descendants of Africans, show that we have not lost the architectural taste and genius of our ancestors who covered Ethiopia, Egypt, Carthage, and old Spain with their superb monuments."

== Current status ==
UNESCO designated it—and the Citadelle—World Heritage Sites in 1982.

Described as "one of the most remarkable attractions in the Western Hemisphere", the Palace of Sans-Souci is "seldom visited by foreigners" due to "decades of political instability and lawlessness" in Haiti.

== Other ==
Another palace constructed for king Henri Christophe, although not finished, was the Palais de la Belle Rivière.

== Bibliography ==
• Bailey, Gauvin Alexander (2018). Der Palast von Sans-Souci in Milot, Haiti - The Palace of Sans-Souci in Milot, Haiti: Das vergessene Potsdam im Regenwald - The Untold Story of the Potsdam of the Rainforest (in German and English). München, Berlin: Deutscher Kunstverlag. p. 200. ISBN 978-3422074668.
