= Citadelle Laferrière =

Historic fortress and symbol of Haitian independence

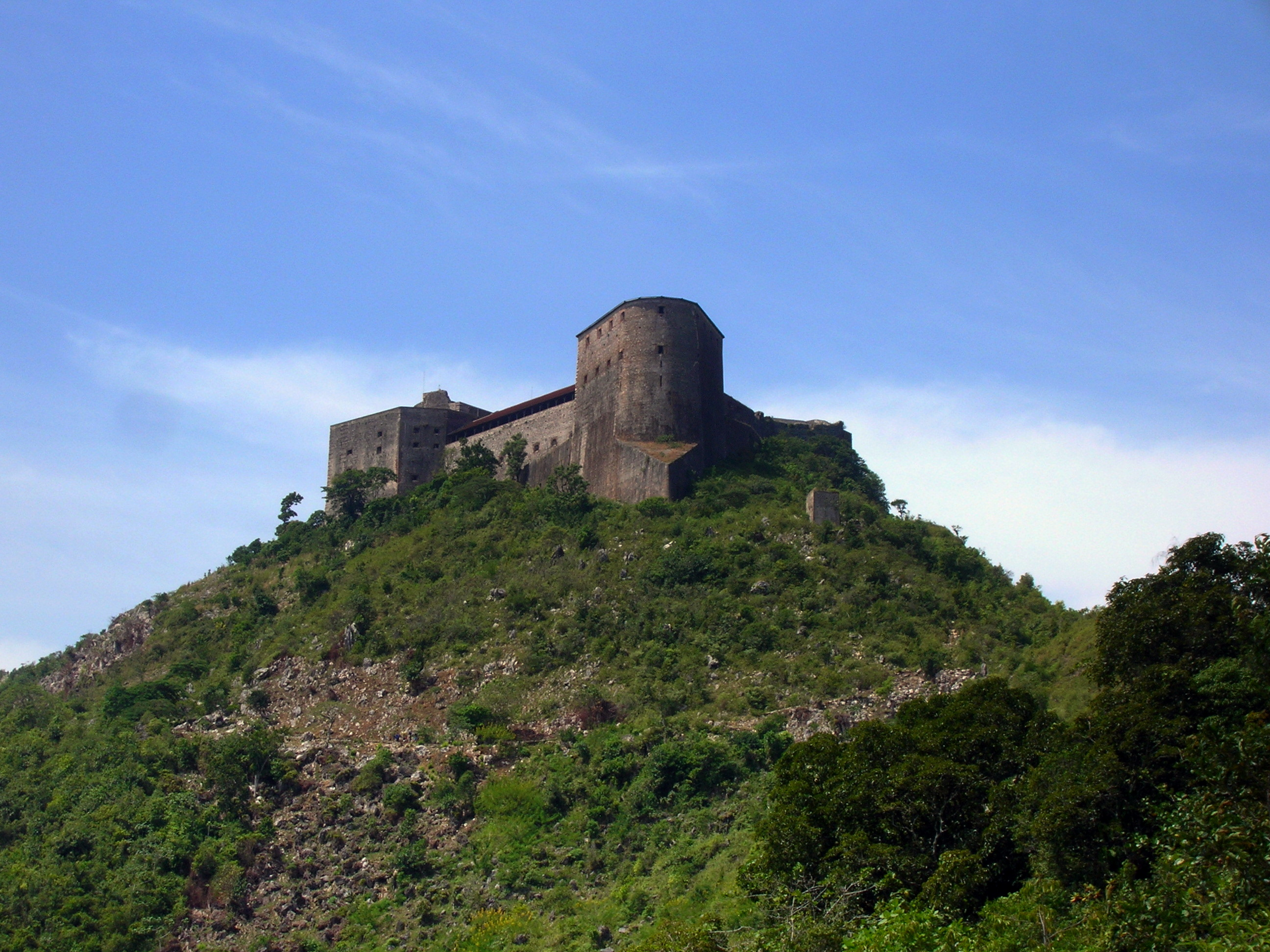
- The Citadelle Laferrière

- Location within Haiti
- 19.573611°N 72.243889°W
- Location: Milot, Nord, Haiti

History
- Built: 1820
- Built by: Henri Christophe

Site notes
- Elevation: 910 metres (2,990 ft)
- Area: 10,000 square metres (110,000 sq ft)

UNESCO World Heritage Site
- Official name: National History Park – Citadel, Sans Souci, Ramiers
- Type: Cultural
- Criteria: iv, vi
- Designated: 1982 (6th session)
- Reference no.: 180
- State Party: Haiti
- Region: Caribbean

The Citadelle Laferrière (French pronunciation: [sitadɛl lafɛʁjɛʁ]; Haitian Creole: Sitadèl-Laferyè), commonly known as La Citadelle (English: "The Citadel"), is a large early-19th-century fortress located in Milot in Nord, Haiti. It is situated on the Bonnet à l'Evêque mountaintop located approximately 8 kilometres (5.0 mi) uphill from the town of Milot, 27 kilometres (17 mi) south of the city of Cap-Haïtien, and 15 kilometres (9.3 mi) southwest of the Three Bays Protected Area.

Built by tens of thousands of former slaves, the Citadelle Laferrière was commissioned by Haitian revolutionary Henri Christophe, for whom it is also named Citadelle Henri Christophe. It was built to help the newly independent First Empire of Haiti defend itself against a potential French incursion, which never came.

The Citadelle is one of few African-derived military fortifications in the New World, as well as the first example of African-derived colonial architecture. Designated by UNESCO as a World Heritage Site in 1982 along with the Sans-Souci Palace, also commissioned by Christophe, the fortress is universally regarded as a landmark of Haiti.

== History ==
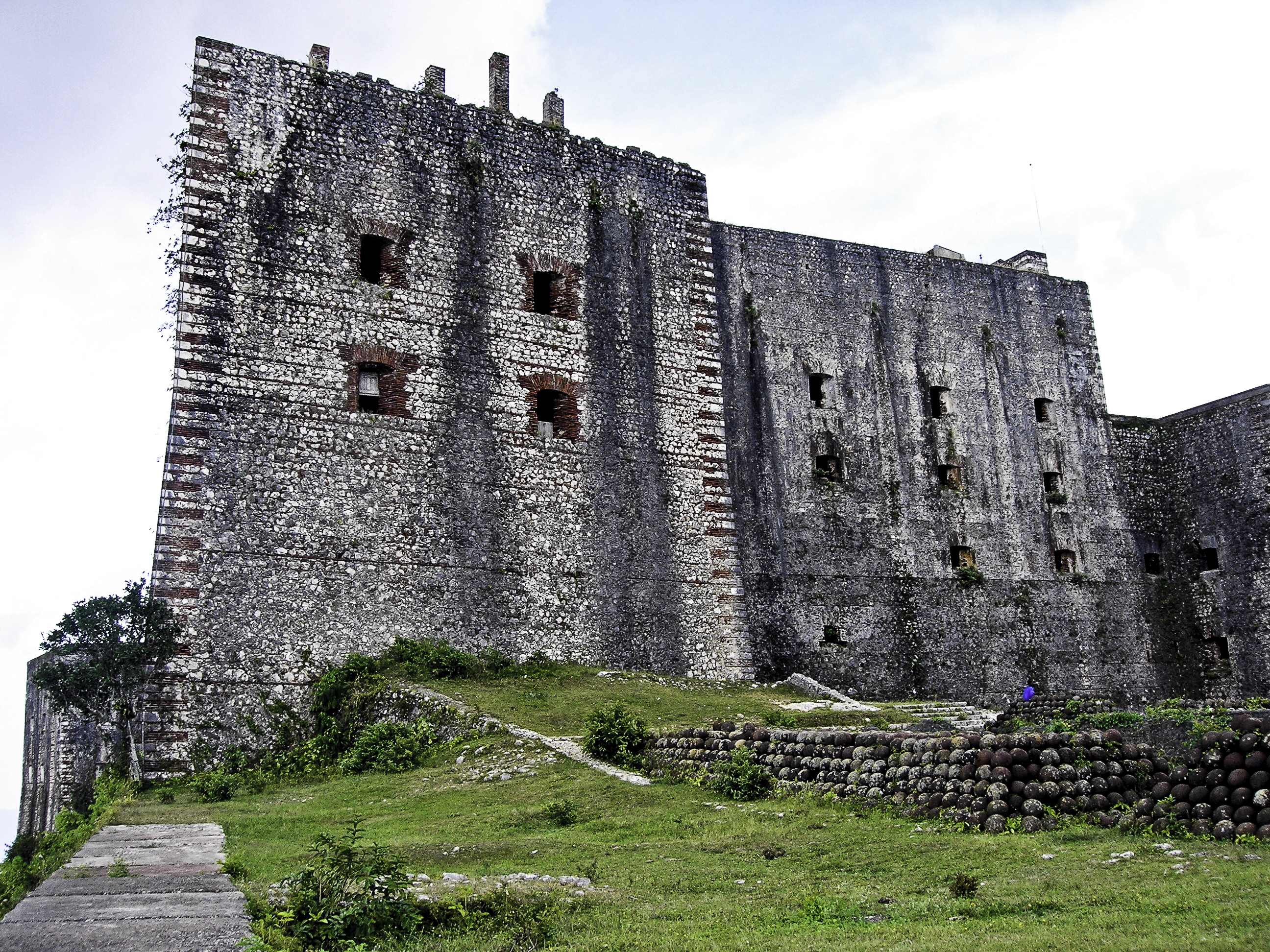
Walls of the citadel

The Citadelle was commissioned in 1805 by Henri Christophe and completed in 1820. The fortress was built as part of a system of fortifications designed to thwart potential foreign invaders, especially from France. Haiti had been under French rule until 1803, when the Haitians defeated the French. The fortress proved needless, for Napoleon, occupied with his European campaigns, never tried to regain Haiti.

During the stronghold's conceptual phase, Christophe was a general in the Haitian army and chief administrator of the country's northern regions. In 1811, after a power struggle with rival and fellow revolutionary Alexandre Pétion, Christophe declared himself king of Northern Haiti.

The Citadelle, whose construction involved up to 20,000 workers of whom 10% are believed to have died, was built several kilometres inland atop the 900-metre (3,000 ft) Bonnet à l'Eveque mountain, to provide an optimal vantage point. The location enabled Haitian forces to keep watch over a vast distance, from the nearby valleys to the coastline. Cap-Haïtien and the adjoining Atlantic Ocean are visible from the roof of the fortress. It is the largest fortress in Haiti and one of the largest in the New World. It continues to serve as a symbol of Haitian independence.

The Haitians outfitted the fortress with 365 cannons of varying size, assembled from munitions left behind by European forces that formerly occupied the island. The enormous stockpiles of cannonballs still sit in pyramidal stacks at the base of the fortress walls. Since its construction, the fortress has withstood numerous earthquakes, though a French attack never came. The fortress was eventually abandoned.

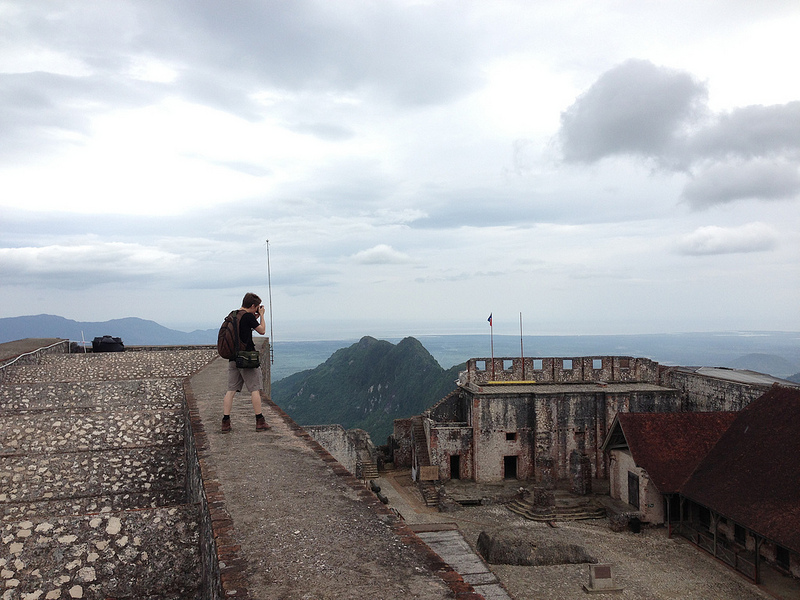
View from the walls

In the event of an invasion, Christophe planned to have his military burn the valuable crops and food stocks along the coast, then retreat to the fortress, setting ambushes along the sole mountain path leading to the Citadelle.

Christophe suffered a stroke in 1820, and some of his troops mutinied. Shortly afterwards, he committed suicide—according to legend, by shooting himself with a silver bullet. Loyal followers covered his body in quicklime and entombed it in one of the Citadelle's interior courtyards to prevent others from mutilating the corpse.

== Description ==
The colossal physical dimensions of the fortress have made it a Haitian national symbol, featured on currency, stamps, and tourist-ministry posters. The fortress walls rise 40 metres (130 ft) from the mountaintop and the entire complex, including cannonball stocks but excluding the surrounding grounds, covers an area of 10,000 square metres (110,000 sq ft). Workers laid the large foundation stones of the fortress directly into the stone of the mountaintop, using a mortar mixture that included quicklime, molasses, the blood of local cows and goats, and cows' hooves that were cooked to a glue and added to the mix to give the mortar added strength and bonding power.

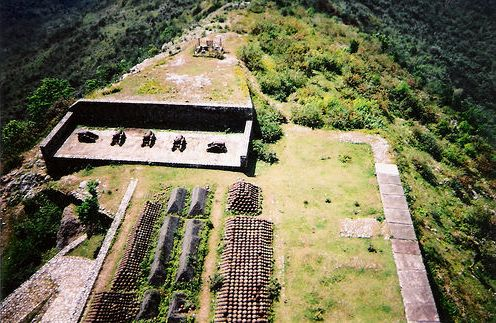
Cannonball stockpiles, viewed from the roof

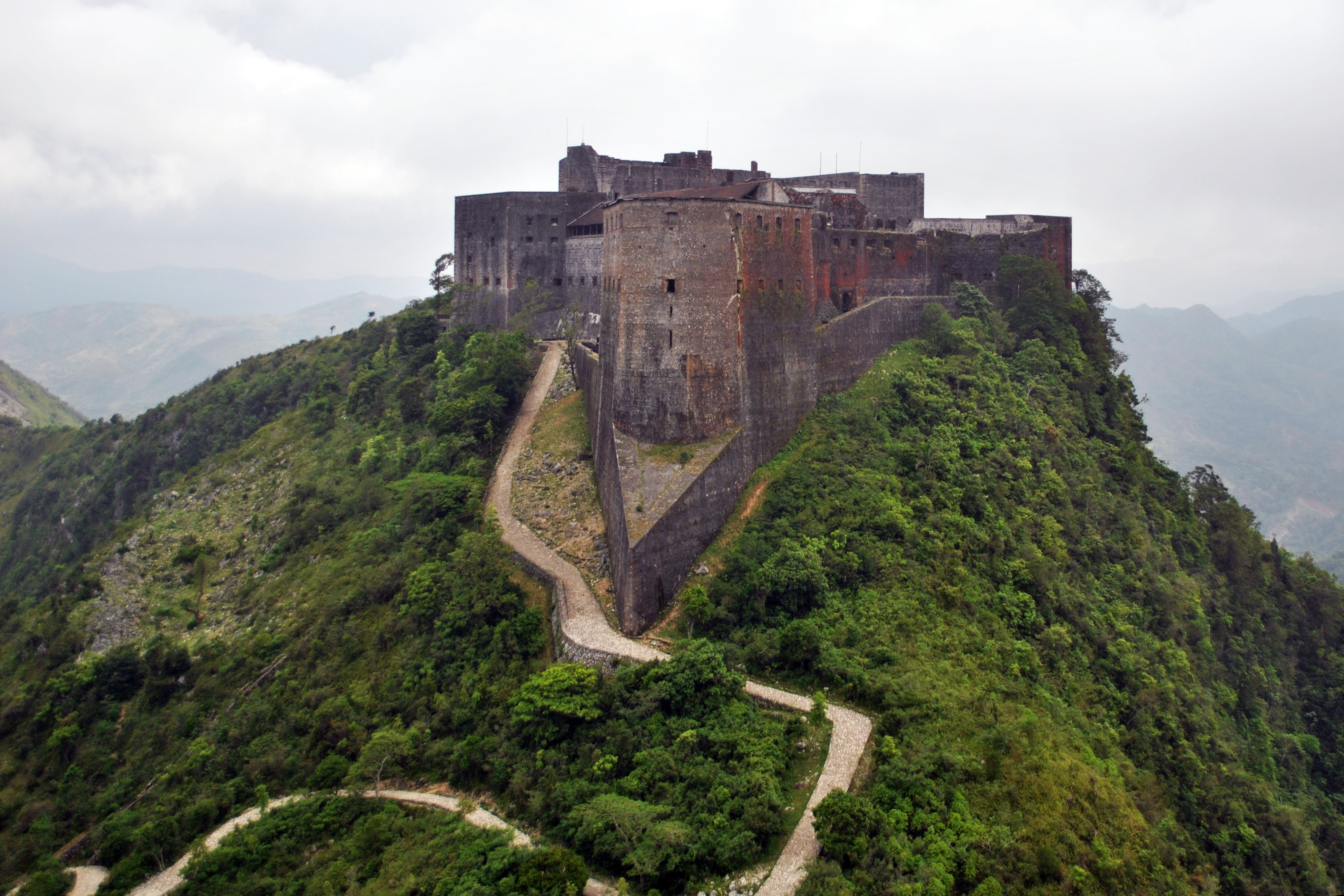
Citadelle Laferrière seen from a US Army UH-60 Black Hawk during Operation Unified Response, after the 2010 Haiti earthquake

Large cisterns and storehouses in the fortress's interior were designed to store enough food and water for 5,000 defenders for up to one year. The fortress included palace quarters for the king and his family, in the event that they needed to take refuge within its walls. Other facilities included dungeons, bathing quarters, and bakery ovens. Also visible is the tomb of Christophe's brother-in-law, killed when the gunpowder room he was in exploded.

The Citadelle's appearance from the trail leading up to its base has been likened to the prow of a great stone ship, jutting out from the mountainside. The structure is angular and assumes different angular forms based on the viewer's orientation. Some of the angles on the Citadelle were intentionally put there by Christophe to deflect cannonballs. The Epaulette is an example of a feature that incorporates such angles.

Though most of the fortress has no roof as such, with the interior top being a latticework of stone walkways, some slanted portions are adorned with bright red tiles. The fortress has been repaired and refurbished several times since its construction, including in the 1980s with help from UNESCO and the World Monuments Fund, though little of it has been replaced and its design remains the same.

== Tourism ==
The Citadelle is one of the most popular tourist destinations in Haiti. Directions to and history of the fortress are provided by self-appointed guides from the town of Milot. Near the entrance to Sans-Souci Palace, which is at the start of the trail to the Citadelle, visitors may be asked to pay a small fee. Visitors are also encouraged to rent a horse for the uphill trek. The first portion of the 7 kilometre trail is navigable by 4WD vehicle, although infrequent landslides and construction projects sometimes make this unreliable.

People live along the trail and sell souvenirs or drinks, such as fresh coconut juice, to travelers. The trail is paved stone, generally smooth and in good condition. About three-quarters of the way up from the parking lot, visitors must complete the final portion on horseback or on foot. The entire 11-kilometre (7 mi) trail, starting in Milot, is almost completely uphill, but can be walked by experienced hikers who carry plenty of water.

Most of the interior of the Citadelle fortress is accessible to visitors, who may climb the numerous staircases to the fortress's roof, which is free of guardrails. On a clear day, the city of Cap-Haïtien and the Atlantic Ocean can be seen to the north. Because of its elevation, the top of the Citadelle is used by United Nations Stabilization Mission in Haiti (MINUSTAH) for a Radio repeater, with an antenna on the highest point.

Though the turbulent political situation in Haiti, principally in the central region, has deterred visitors in recent years, the regions of the north and south of the country remain largely peaceful, making travel to the Citadel less challenging or hazardous than travel within the Haitian capital, Port-au-Prince.

On 11 April 2026, at least 30 people were crushed to death and dozens more were injured after a stampede at the fortress. Initial reports said visitors were crammed against a single entrance and a scuffle broke out between those trying to leave and those trying to enter the site.

== Conservation and safety concerns ==
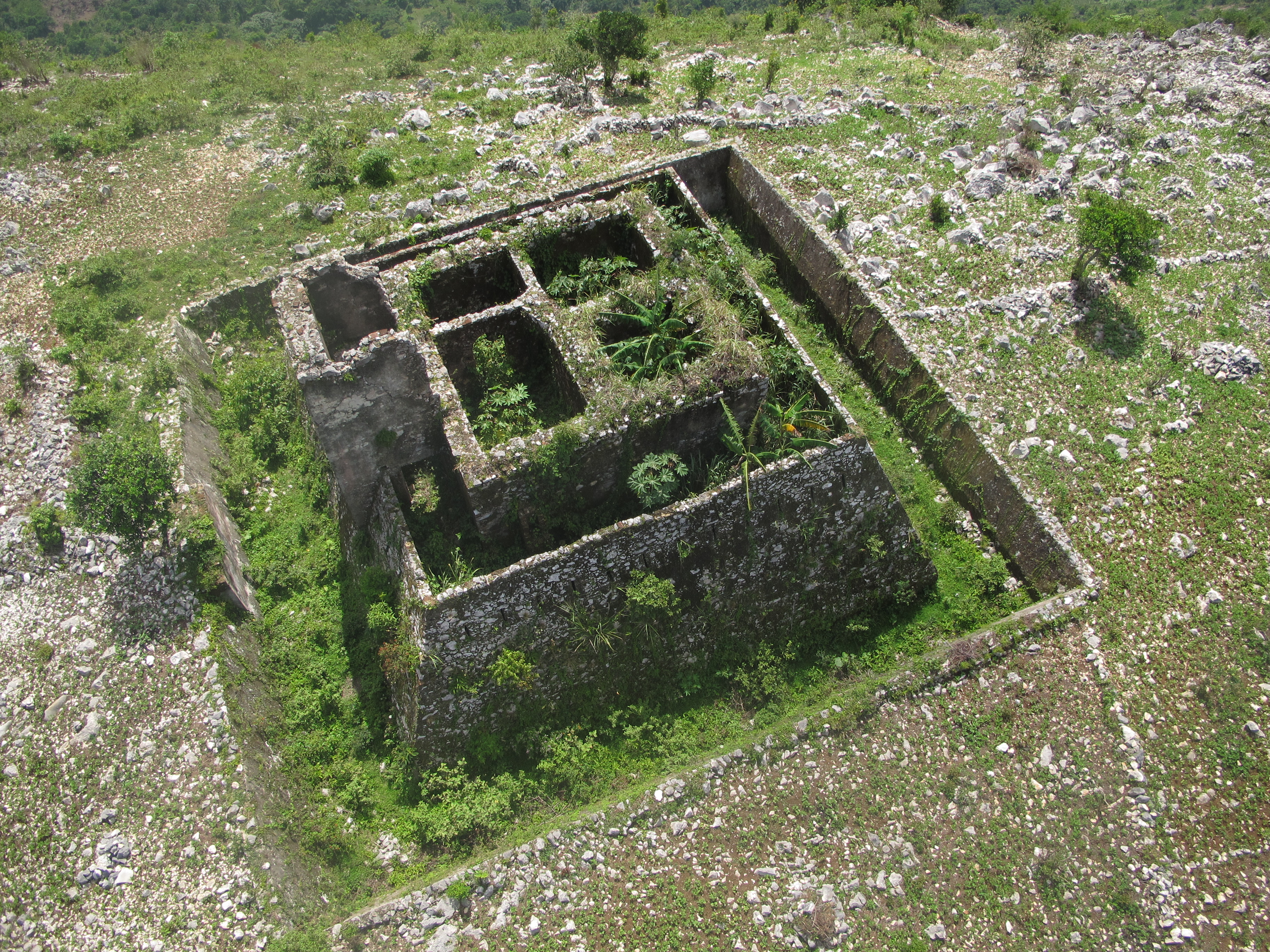
An aerial view of a nearby gun emplacement

After visiting the Citadelle in July 2012, Haitian President Michel Martelly heavily criticized the Haitian National Institute for Historic Preservation (ISPAN)—the organization tasked with preserving Haiti's cultural heritage sites—describing the site as in a state of disrepair and calling ISPAN's efforts "unacceptable". His visit was intended to assess the state of the Citadel for conservation, but he refused to visit its upper levels, deeming them unsafe for visitors.

The Global Heritage Fund, a California-based non-profit organization, has investigated the Citadelle for monument conservation, community development, training and cultural heritage revitalization. The project would focus on both the Citadelle and nearby Sans-Souci Palace, with hopes of preserving the structures as safe tourism sites to promote sustainable local economic growth.
