= Milot, Haiti =

Milot Milo
- Commune
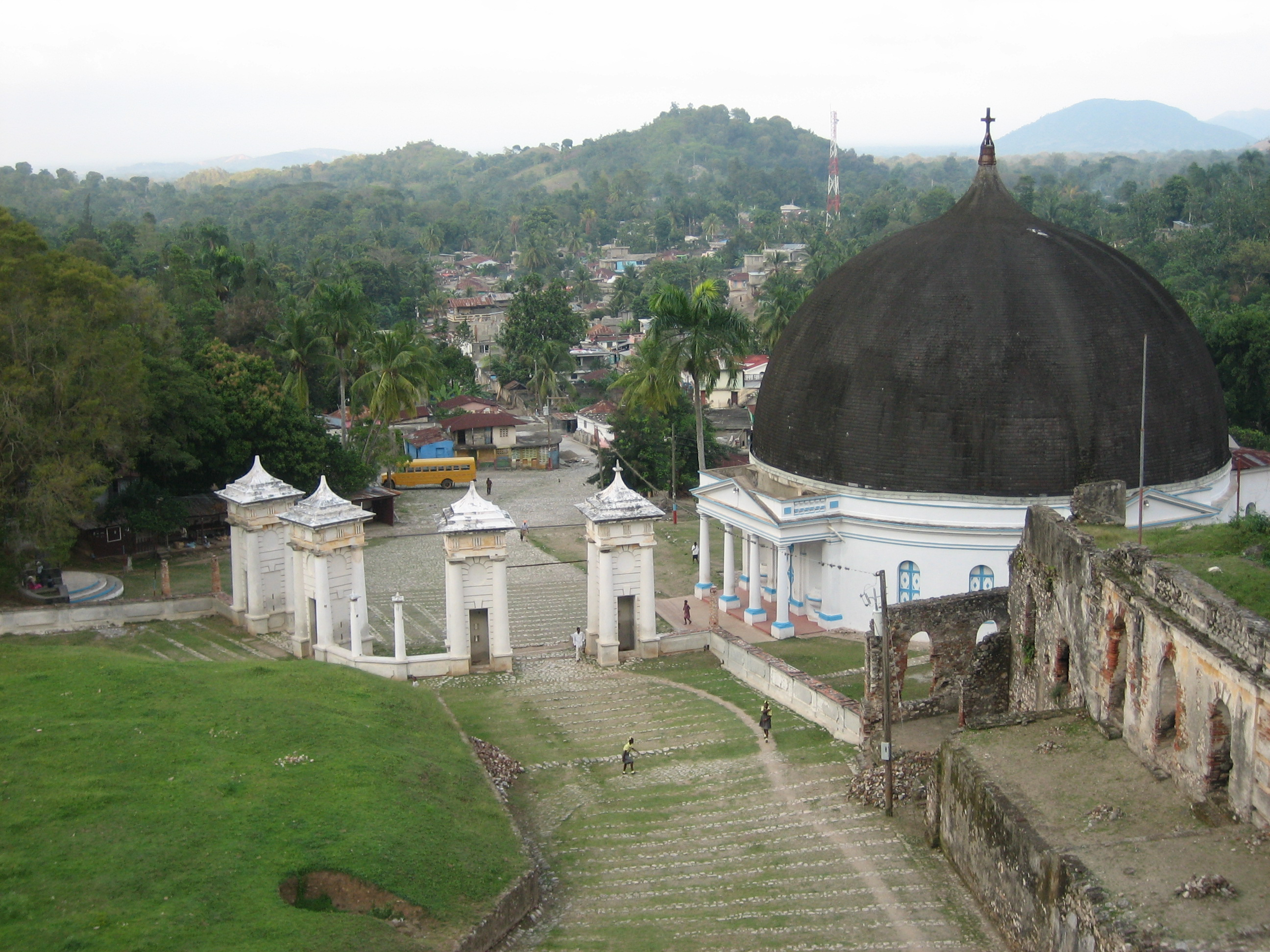
- Milot from the gates of the Sans-Souci Palace

- Location in Haiti
- Coordinates: 19°37′0″N 72°13′0″W
- Country: Haiti
- Department: Nord
- Arrondissement: Acul-du-Nord

Population (2015)
  - Total: 31 992
- Time zone: UTC-05:00 (EST)
  - Summer (DST): UTC-04:00 (EDT)
- Communal Sections: 3

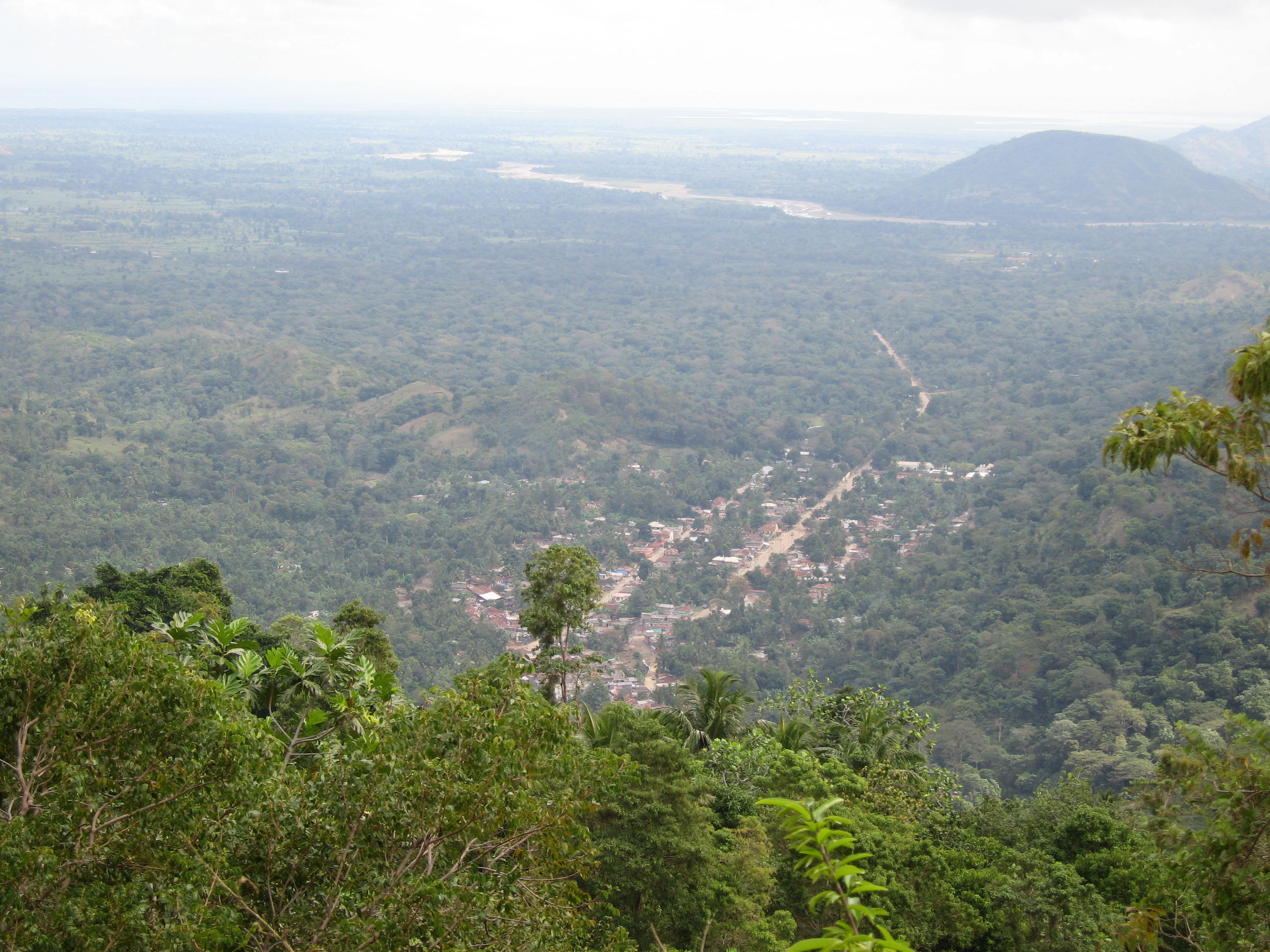
A view of Milot from the road up to the Citadel.

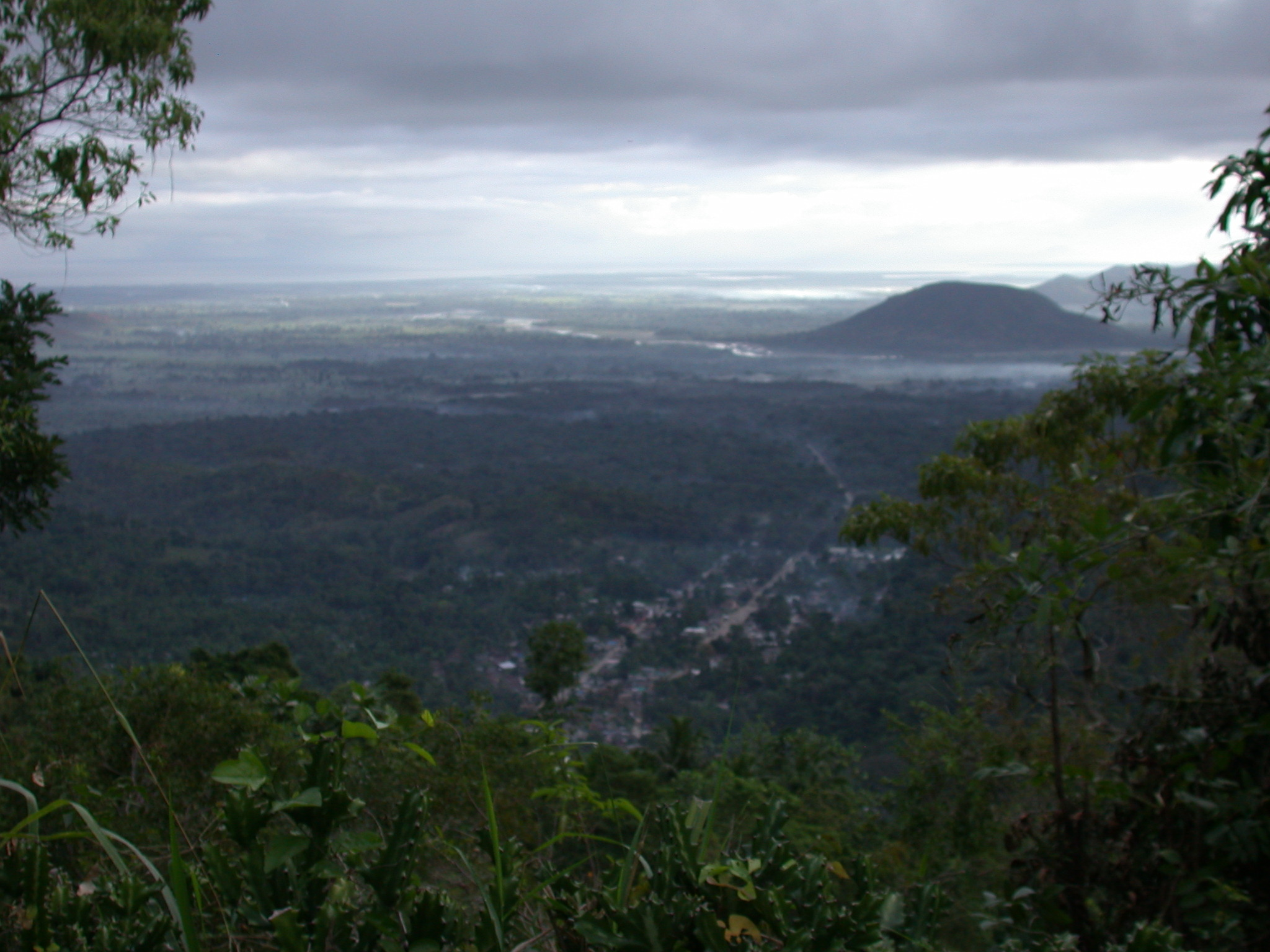
Milot, Haiti

Milot (French pronunciation: [milo]; Haitian Creole: Milo) is a commune in the Nord department of Haiti, 12 miles south of Cap-Haïtien. It is the site of Sans-Souci Palace, one of Haiti's most revered landmarks. The Citadelle Laferrière, Haiti's best-known landmark, is five miles (8 km) by road to the south. The town also hosts a hospital, Hôpital Sacré Coeur, run by the Sovereign Military Order of Malta and the Crudem Foundation.

== Communal sections ==
The commune consists of three communal sections, namely:

- Perches-de-Bonnet, rural
- Bonnet à l'Evêque, urban (town of Milot) and rural
- Genipailler, urban (Carrefour des Pères neighborhood) and rural

== History ==
The earliest documentation of inhabitants in Milot is 1786, when there was a small plantation in the area. Milot's growth was strongly shaped by the Haitian revolutionary Henri Christophe. From 1802 to 1804, Milot was the base of his military operations. It grew further after the Haitian Declaration of Independence marked the end of the revolution, becoming a small town by 1806. At this time, it may have consisted of 160 houses with 500 residents.
