= Trouillot =

Trouillot is a French surname. It may refer to:

- Ertha Pascal-Trouillot (born 1943), provisional President of Haiti in 1990–91
- Évelyne Trouillot (born 1954), Haitian novelist
- Georges Trouillot (1851–1916), French politician
- Henock Trouillot (1923–88), Haitian historian, playwright, and novelist
- Jocelyne Trouillot (born 1948), Haitian writer and educator
- Lyonel Trouillot (born 1956), Haitian novelist and poet
- Michel-Rolph Trouillot (1949–2012), Haitian academic and anthropologist
- Mildred Trouillot (born 1963), American lawyer and wife of Jean-Bertrand Aristide, former President of Haïti
