= Fabienne Kanor =

French journalist, novelist and filmmaker (born 1970)

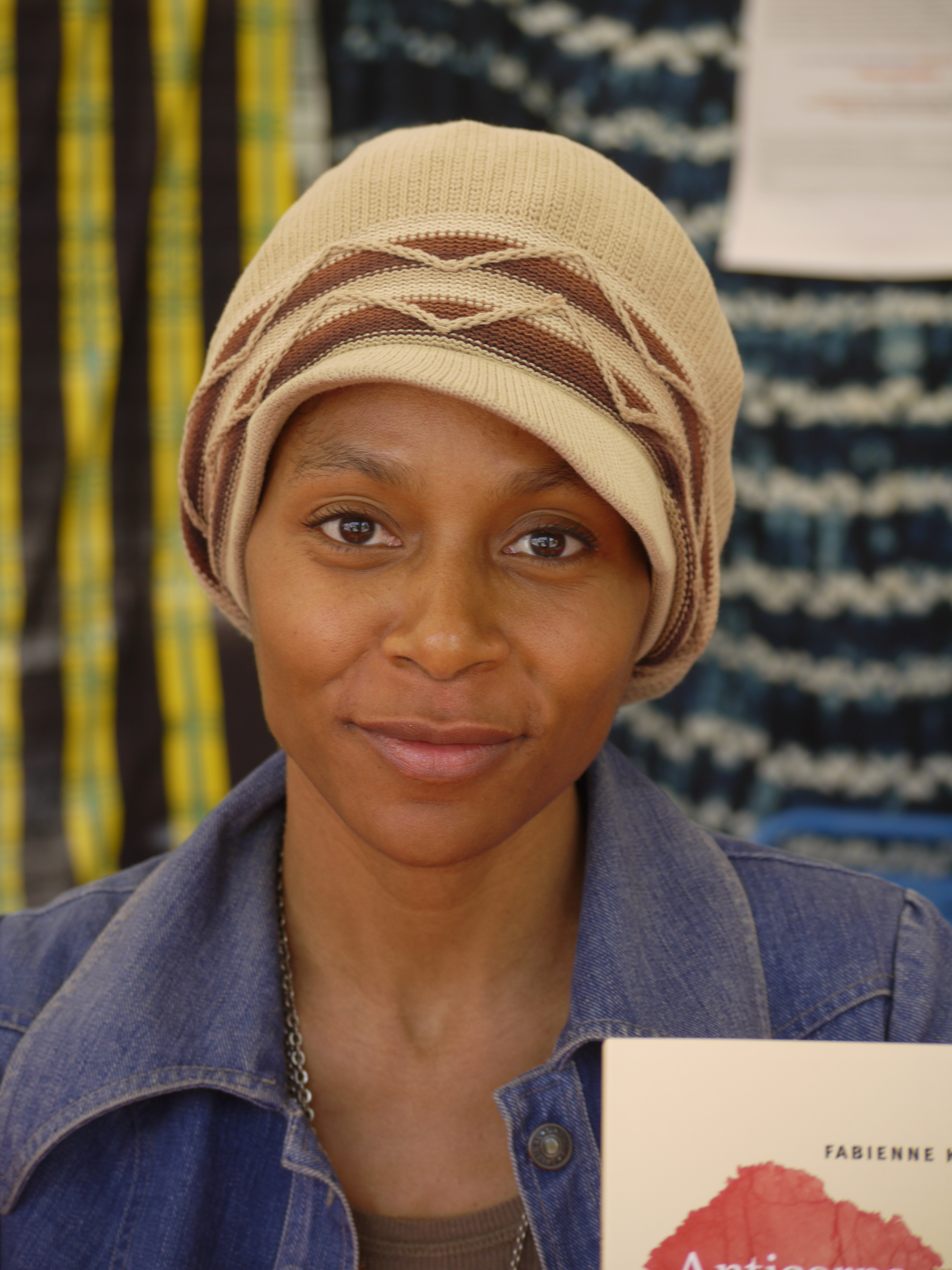
- Born: 7 August 1970 (age 56); Orléans, France
- Education: University of Orléans
- Writing career
- Language: French
- Genres: Novel, screenplay, children's literature
- Notable work: Faire l'aventure
- Notable awards: Prix Carbet de la Caraïbe et du Tout-Monde

Fabienne Kanor (born 7 August 1970) is a French journalist, novelist and filmmaker of Martinique origin. She is a winner of the Prix Carbet de la Caraïbe et du Tout-Monde.

== Early life ==
Fabienne Kanor was born in Orléans, France on 7 August 1970. Her mother was a nursing assistant and her father worked in the French post and telegraph office. She obtained degrees in modern literature and sociolinguistics at the University of Orléans and Tours, and went on to study in Paris under Romuald Fonkoua. Her master's thesis was titled La Problématique de la terre dans la littérature antillaise.

== Career ==
Following her studies, Kanor took up a job at a communications company. At this time she wrote her first novel, which remained unpublished. She then worked as a journalist for television (La Cinquième, Paris Première, France 3 and Canal France Internationale), radio (Radio France Internationale and Radio Nova), and press (Nova Magazine). These roles allowed her to concentrate on fiction, and also develop as a filmmaker. Between 2001 and 2003, she directed a series of documentaries on black women, including Jenny Alpha, Césaria Evora and Mimi Barthélémy.

Kanor lived for two years in Saint-Louis, Senegal, during which she wrote and published her novel D'Eaux douces. This won the Prix Fetkann! in 2004. Her second novel, Humus, appeared after her sojourn in Benin. This book was inspired by an anecdote in the logbook of a captain of a slave ship in 1774, which reported that fourteen women jumped into the sea rather than proceed into slavery. Renée Larrier noted that "Kanor's polyphonic text is part of a series of recent works dealing with women's resistance to involuntary servitude."

Between the two novels, she and her sister Véronique Kanor began making films. La Noiraude was the first of a planned trilogy of medium-length films, and it explored the trials and tribulations faced by Caribbean people in Paris. It was broadcast on France 2 and RFO, and received well at various film festivals. The second instalment in the trilogy, C'est qui L'Homme, was broadcast on France 2 in 2009. This examined gender dynamics in relationships and the position assigned to women by their male partners.

In 2008, Kanor collaborated with Emmanuelle Bidou on Janbé dlo: une histoire antillaise, a documentary that traced the three stages of Caribbean emigration to France from the perspective of families.

In 2011, Kanor participated in the International Writing Program's Fall Residency at the University of Iowa in Iowa City, IA.

Kanor's 2014 book Faire l'aventure was praised as a "rare book", an "odyssey of disillusion", a chilling exploration of the undocumented life of an illegal immigrant and the "venomous relations between white and black people".

== Awards ==
- 2004 - Prix Fetkann!, for D'Eaux douces.
- 2005 - Special mention by the jury of Prix Carbet de la Caraïbe et du Tout-Monde for Humus.
- 2007 - Prix RFO du livre, for Humus.
- 2014 - Prix Carbet de la Caraïbe et du Tout-Monde, for Faire l'aventure.

== Works ==
=== Novels ===
- D'Eaux douces. Paris: Gallimard. 2004. ISBN 978-2070734757.
- Humus. Paris: Gallimard. 2006. ISBN 978-2070780853.
- Les chiens ne font pas des chats. Paris: Gallimard. 2008. ISBN 978-2070120352.
- Anticorps. Paris: Gallimard. 2010. ISBN 978-2070127177.
- Faire l'aventure. Paris: Lattès. 2014. ISBN 978-2709643634.

=== Children's fiction ===
- Le jour où la mer a disparu. Paris: Albin Michel Jeunesse. 2007. ISBN 978-2226177643.

=== Film and television ===
- La Noiraude (with Véronique Kanor). Bouquin Affamé Productions (France, 2005), 29 minutes.
- Janbé dlo: une histoire antillaise (Traverser l'eau) (with Emmanelle Bidou). France Cinq and Télessonne, 2007, 52 minutes.
- Ti Emile Pò kò mò (with Jean-Michel Cassérus). Paris: Productions La Lanterne, 2008, 54 minutes.
- C'est qui L'Homme (with Véronique Kanor). France 2, 2009.
