= Lyonel Trouillot =

Haitian writer and journalist

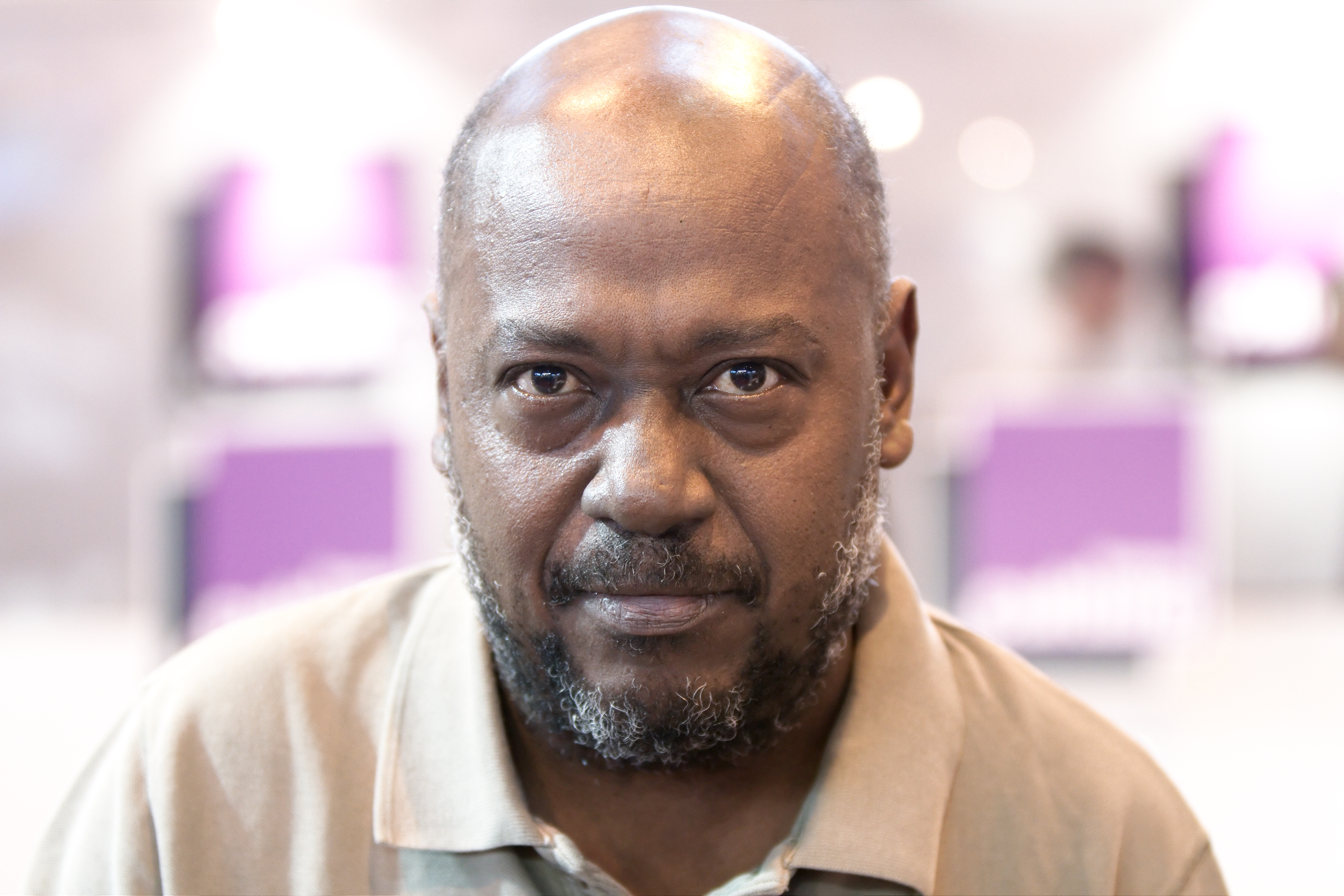
- Lyonel Trouillot at a live broadcast from the Paris Book Fair, March 2010.
- Born: 31 December 1956 (age 69); Port-au-Prince, Haiti
- Relatives: Michel-Rolph Trouillot (brother), Évelyne Trouillot (sister), Jocelyne Trouillot (sister), Henock Trouillot (uncle)
- Writing career
- Language: French, Haitian Creole
- Genres: novels, poetry, song lyrics
- Notable awards: Prix Carbet de la Caraïbe et du Tout-Monde (2013)

Lyonel Trouillot (French: [ljɔnɛl tʁujo]; born 31 December 1956, in Port-au-Prince, Haiti) is a novelist and poet in French and Haitian Creole, a journalist and a professor of French and Creole literature in Port-au-Prince.

== Early life ==
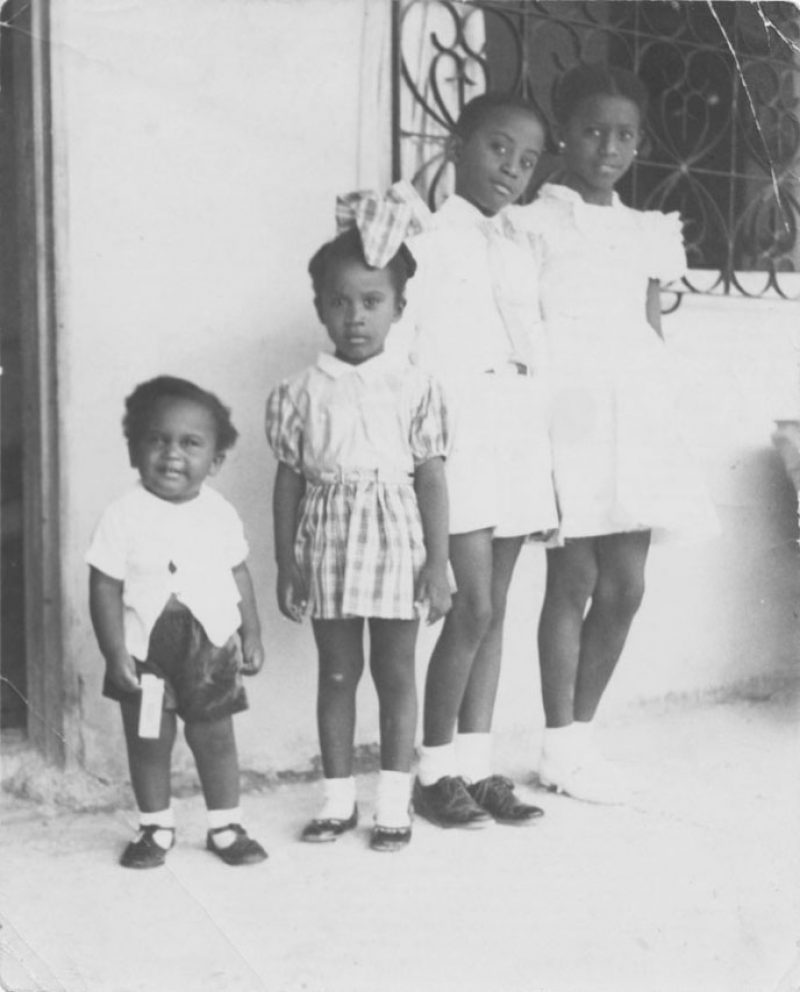
Left-to-right: Lyonel, Évelyne, Michel-Rolph, and Jocelyne Trouillot in front of their home in Port-au-Prince, Haiti.

Lyonel Trouillot was born into a family of lawyers. He has a brother, Michel-Rolph Trouillot (anthropologist and historian), and his two sisters are the writer Évelyne Trouillot and the writer and educator Jocelyne Trouillot. His uncle was the historian Henock Trouillot. Following his parents' divorce in the late 1960s, he went to the United States with his mother. He returned to Haiti at age 19, in 1975.

Between 1980 and 1982, political repression forced Trouillot to emigrate to Miami.

== Career ==
Trouillot initially studied law, but his passion for literature pushed him towards a career as a writer. At the start of his career, Trouillot contributed to several different newspapers and magazines in Haiti, publishing poetry and writing song lyrics for musical artists such as Tambou Libète, Toto Bissainthe, Jean Coulanges, and Manno Charlemagne.

Trouillot began publishing his work in Port-au-Prince. His first novel, Les fous de Saint-Antoine, was published in 1989 by Editions Deschamps, prefaced by his mentor, René Philoctète. His second book, Le Livre de Marie, was published in 1993 by Editions Mémoire, and his third novel, Rue des pas-perdus, was published in 1998 by Actes Sud in Paris. In 2000, Thèrese en mille morceaux, published by Actes Sud, made him known worldwide.

Trouillot's poetic writing, close to spiralism (a Haitian literary genre stemming from the Duvalier regimes), attracted readers and publishers alike. His exceptional talent and the depth of his writing place him among some of the greatest francophone authors. His novel La Belle Amour humaine earned him a place among the four finalists for the Prix Goncourt in 2011 – ultimately won that year by Alexis Jenni for L'Art français de la guerre. In 2013, he paid homage to Haitian comedian Karl Marcel Casséus in Parabole du failli.

In addition to writing, Trouillot has taken on many other projects throughout his career. Along with his sister Évelyne and her daughter Nadève Ménard, he founded a writer's organisation named Pré-Texte. In 2014 he wrote, with Raoul Peck and Pascal Bonitzer, the script for Peck's feature film Murder in Pacot. Trouillot is also a co-editor of the journal Cahiers du Vendredi, as well as cofounder and director of Atelier Jeudi Soir.

== Politics ==
Trouillot is known for his political stances and for his resistance to the Haitian Duvalierist dictatorship. He was also part of the Collective Non of intellectuals and artists that helped to build momentum for the U.S. and paramilitary-backed ouster of the democratically elected president Jean-Bertrand Aristide. He was a member of the unelected transitional government following the departure of Aristide, as a cabinet minister of culture. The unelected transitional government of Gerard Latortue (of which Trouillot was a member between 2004 and 2006) was shown to be involved in massive human rights violations and to work closely with the "families" of the local elite groups within the country while being heavily funded by the US Bush administration.

As an activist for democracy and justice in his country, his works often give voice to the voiceless, as seen in his 2004 novel, Bicentenaire. In 2016, during an interview in Libération for the publication of his novel Kannjawou, Trouillot denounced the dominance of Evangelical Christian denominations in Haiti. Trouillot is also a founding member of Rasanbleman pou Diyite Ayiti (RADI), which denounces many acts of violence and inequality in the country.

== Select bibliography ==
=== Novels ===
- Les Fous de Saint-Antoine: traversée rythmique. (prefaced par René Philoctète) Port-au-Prince: Editions Deschamps, 1989; Pétion-Ville: C3 Éditions, 2013
- Le Livre de Marie. Port-au-Prince: Editions Mémoire,1993.
- Rue des pas-perdus, Arles, Actes Sud, 1998, [Ed. Mémoire Port-au-Prince, 1996]
- Thérèse en mille morceaux, Actes Sud, Arles, 2000
- Les enfants des héros, Actes Sud, Arles, 2002
- Bicentenaire, Actes Sud, Arles, 2004
- L'Amour avant que j'oublie, Actes Sud, Arles, 2007
- Yanvalou pour Charlie, Actes Sud, Arles, 2009
  - dt. Yanvalou für Charlie, 2016, Traduction Barbara Heber-Schärer, Claudia Steinitz, Liebeskind Verlagsbuchhandlung, ISBN 978-3-95438-066-4
- La Belle Amour humaine, Actes Sud, Arles, 2011
- Parabole du failli, Actes Sud, Arles, 2013
- Kannjawou, Arles, Actes Sud, 2016
- Ne m’appelle pas Capitaine, Arles, Actes Sud, 2018
- Antoine des Gommiers, Arles, Actes Sud, 2021
- Veilleuse du Calvaire, Arles, Actes Sud, 2023

=== Poetry ===
- Depale, Editions des Ecrivains Haitiens, 1979 (with Pierre Richard Narcisse).
- Éloge de la contemplation, Riveneuve, Paris, 2009.
- Le doux parfum des temps à venir, Actes Sud, 2013.
- C'est avec mains qu'on fait chansons, Le Temps des Cerises, 2015.

=== Non-fiction ===
- Haïti, le dur devoir d'exister, with Amélie Baron, Mémoire d'Encrier, Montréal, 2010.
- Objectif : l'autre, with André Versaille, Brussels, Belgium, 2012.
- Dictionnaire de la rature, with Geneviève de Maupeou and Alain Sancerni, Actes Sud, 2014

== Awards and recognition ==
Trouillot was made a Chevalier des Arts et des Lettres in 2010.

In 2011, he was awarded the Prix Wepler for his novel Yanvalou pour Charlie. For La Belle Amour humane, he was awarded the Grand Prix du Roman Métis (2011), the Geneva Book Fair Literary Prize (2012), and the Gitanjali Literary Prize (2012).

In 2013, he was awarded the Prix Carbet de la Caraïbe et du Tout-Monde for his work Parabole du failli.
