= Economic liberalization =

Policy advocating for fewer government regulations

Economic liberalization, or economic liberalisation, is the lessening of government regulations and restrictions in an economy in exchange for greater participation by private entities. In politics, the doctrine is associated with classical liberalism and neoliberalism. Liberalization in short is "the removal of controls" to encourage economic development.

Many countries have pursued and followed the path of economic liberalization in the 1980s, 1990s and in the 21st century, with the stated goal of maintaining or increasing their competitiveness as business environments. Liberalization policies may or often include the partial or complete privatization of government institutions and state-owned assets, greater labour market flexibility, lower tax rates for businesses, less restrictions on both domestic and foreign capital, open markets, etc. In support of liberalization, former British prime minister Tony Blair wrote: "Success will go to those companies and countries which are swift to adapt, slow to complain, open and willing to change. The task of modern governments is to ensure that our countries can rise to this challenge."

In developing countries, economic liberalization refers more to liberalization or further "opening up" of their respective economies to foreign capital and investments. Three of the fastest growing developing economies today; Brazil, China, and India, have achieved rapid economic growth in the past several years or decades, in part, from having liberalized their economies to foreign capital.

Many countries nowadays, particularly those in the third world, arguably were given no choice but to "liberalize" their economies to remain competitive in attracting and retaining both their domestic and foreign investments. This is referred to as the TINA factor, standing for "there is no alternative". For example, in China after the Cultural Revolution, the reform and opening up were introduced. Similarly, in the Philippines, the contentious proposals for Charter Change include amending the economically restrictive provisions of their 1987 constitution.

By this measure, an opposite of a liberalized economy are economies such as North Korea's economy with their "self-sufficient" economic system that is closed to foreign trade and investment (see autarky). However, North Korea is not completely separate from the global economy, since it actively trades with China, through Dandong, a large border port and receives aid from other countries in exchange for peace and restrictions in their nuclear programme. Another example would be oil-rich countries such as Saudi Arabia and the United Arab Emirates, which see no need to further open up their economies to foreign capital and investments since their oil reserves already provide them with huge export earnings.

Economic liberalization applies to domestic deregulation and trade liberalization such as free trade.

== Measures of economic liberalization ==
The Fraser Institute constructed an index of economic freedom based on size of government, Legal system and property rights, sound money, freedom to trade internationally, and regulation.

The Heritage Foundation constructed a similar index with 4 main pillars and 12 subcategories: Rule of Law (property rights, judicial effectiveness, government integrity), Government Size (government spending, tax burden, fiscal health), Regulatory Efficiency (business freedom, labor freedom, monetary freedom), Open Markets (trade freedom, investment freedom, financial freedom).

== Potential benefits ==
Liberalization offers the opportunity for the service sector to compete internationally, contributing to GDP growth and generating foreign exchange. As such, service exports are an important part of many developing countries' growth strategies. India's IT services have become globally competitive as many companies have outsourced certain administrative functions to countries where costs (esp. wages) are lower. Furthermore, if service providers in some developing economies are not competitive enough to succeed on world markets, overseas companies will be attracted to invest, bringing with them international "best practices" and better skills and technologies. The entry of foreign service providers can be a positive as well as negative development. For example, it can lead to better services for domestic consumers, improve the performance and competitiveness of domestic service providers, as well as simply attract FDI/foreign capital into the country. In fact, some research suggest a 50% cut in service trade barriers over a five- to ten-year period would create global gains in economic welfare of around $250 billion per annum.

Preferential trading areas can increase democratization when a country trades with other democracies.

=== Poverty reduction ===
Proponents of economic liberalization have argued that it reduces poverty. They also argue that extending property rights protection to the poor is one of the most important poverty reduction strategies a nation can implement. Securing property rights to land, the largest asset for most societies, is vital to their economic freedom. The World Bank concludes that increasing land rights is 'the key to reducing poverty' citing that land rights greatly increase poor people's wealth, in some cases doubling it. It is estimated that state recognition of the property of the poor would give them assets worth 40 times all the foreign aid since 1945. Although approaches varied, the World Bank said the key issues were security of tenure and ensuring land transactions were low cost. In China and India, noted reductions in poverty in recent decades have occurred mostly as a result of the abandonment of collective farming in China and the cutting of government red tape in India.

== Potential risks ==
Trade liberalisation carries substantial risks that necessitate careful economic management through appropriate regulation by governments. Some argue foreign providers crowd out domestic providers and instead of leading to investment and the transfer of skills, it allows foreign providers and shareholders "to capture the profits for themselves, taking the money out of the country". Thus, it is often argued that protection is needed to allow domestic companies the chance to develop before they are exposed to international competition. This is also supported by the anthropologist Trouillot who argues that the current market system is not a free market at all, but instead a privatized market (IE, markets can be 'bought'). Other potential risks resulting from liberalisation, include:

- Risks of financial sector instability resulting from global contagion
- Risk of brain drain
- Risk of environmental degradation
- Risk of a debt spiral due to decreased tax revenue among other economic problems (oftentimes linked to IMF restructuring though the state government in Kansas is currently encountering this issue).
- Risk of increased inequality across race, ethnicity, or gender lines. For example, according to the anthropologist Lilu Abu-Lughod we see increased gender inequality in new markets as women lose labor opportunities that existed prior to market liberalization.

However, researchers at thinks tanks such as the Overseas Development Institute argue the risks are outweighed by the benefits and that what is needed is careful regulation. For instance, there is a risk that private providers will 'skim off' the most profitable clients and cease to serve certain unprofitable groups of consumers or geographical areas. Yet such concerns could be addressed through regulation and by a universal service obligations in contracts, or in the licensing, to prevent such a situation from occurring. Of course, this bears the risk that this barrier to entry will dissuade international competitors from entering the market. Examples of such an approach include South Africa's Financial Sector Charter or Indian nurses who promoted the nursing profession within India itself, which has resulted in a rapid growth in demand for nursing education and a related supply response.

Trade between autocracies and democracies can increase democratic backsliding. Wandel durch Handel or "Change through trade" has been criticized for indirectly financing autocratic regimes.

== By region ==
- Economic liberalisation in India
- Economic liberalisation in Myanmar
- Economic liberalisation in Pakistan
- Effects of Economic Liberalisation on Education in Tajikistan
- Baltic Tiger (Estonia, Latvia, Lithuania, c. 2000–present)
- Economy of Cuba, starting in 1994 and accelerating under Raúl Castro
- Indonesian economic boom, Starting after the Secession of East Timor in 1999 with the beginnings of the 21st century.

== Historical examples ==
- Doux commerce
- Economic liberalization in the post–World War II era
- Reform and opening up
- Perestroika (Soviet Union)
- Economic history of Brazil in the 1980s and 1990s
- Miracle of Chile
- Đổi Mới (Vietnam)

== See also ==
- Multilateral development bank
  - International Monetary Fund (IMF)
  - World Bank (WB)
  - Asian Development Bank (ADB)
  - New Development Bank
- Capitalism
- Economic liberalism
- Democracy and economic growth
- Globalization
- International trade theory
- Liberalization

== Sources ==
- Haymes, Stephen; Vidal de Haymes, Maria; Miller, Reuben, eds. (2015). The Routledge Handbook of Poverty in the United States. London: Routledge. ISBN 978-0415673440.
- Jones, Campbell; Parker, Martin; Bos, Rene Ten (2005). For Business Ethics. Routledge. ISBN 978-0415311359.
