= Education in Tajikistan =

National education budget (2005)
- Budget: US$80 million

General details
- Primary languages: Tajik, Russian
- System type: National
- Post secondary: 96,600

Education in Tajikistan consists of four years of primary school followed by two stages of secondary school (lasting five and two years, respectively). Attendance at school is mandatory from age seven to seventeen. In accordance with the Law on Higher Education and Professional Postgraduate Education the country provides for the following levels of higher education:

- Specialist degree (darajai mutakhassis), with studies lasting five years. Five years university degree is equivalent to bachelor (four years) and master's degree (one year).
- Bachelor's degree (darajai bakalavr), with studies lasting not less than four years except for medicine (no less than five years);
- Master's degree (darajai magistr), with studies lasting minimum of one year.

Some higher education institutions still apply an old system by providing specialists degree (darajai mutakhassis) where upon graduation a specialist diploma is awarded, which is equivalently recognized as a master's degree by Higher Education and Professional Postgraduate Education of Tajikistan. On the other hand, some higher education institutions award bachelor's degrees after four years of studying. Thus, those who do not have a bachelor's degree in a specialty cannot start a master's degree. Tajik is the main language of instruction through secondary school, but in 2003 Russian was restored as a mandatory second language.

The Human Rights Measurement Initiative (HRMI) finds that Tajikistan is fulfilling 98.9% of what it should be fulfilling for the right to education based on the country's level of income. HRMI breaks down the right to education by looking at the rights to both primary education and secondary education. While taking into consideration Tajikistan's income level, the nation is achieving 97.9% of what should be possible based on its resources (income) for primary education and 100.o0% for secondary education.

== The education of ancestors of Tajik people ==
According to historical and archaeological research of the ancestors of the Tajik people (for details, see The history of Tajikistan), the first school (dabistany and dabiristany) were more than three thousand years ago. Enormous influence on the Tajik educational philosophy has Aryan culture and religion of Zoroastrianism. During this period, affirmed the unity of training and education, formed institutions of education and the profession of teacher and student. The ancient Greek writer Xenophon (445-355 gg. BC. E.) In his historical novel Cyropaedia ("Education of Cyrus") describes in detail the formulation of education and training of children in the "Persians" that is, the Iranian peoples.

== Overview ==
While the official literacy rate in Tajikistan is 98%, the poor quality of education since 1991 has reduced the skill level of younger people. Although education is compulsory, many children fail to attend because of economic needs and security concerns in some regions. In 2001, pre-primary enrollment was less than 6% of eligible children.

In 2005 the total government expenditure on education was about US$80 million, or 15.9% of the national budget. The figure was scheduled to rise to US$108 million (17.3% of the budget) in 2006. A presidential program raised the salaries of teachers by 25% in 2005.

Some private schools and colleges have appeared in urban centers, and Russian and Uzbek schools exist. Thirty-three institutions of higher learning were operating in 2003 when a constitutional amendment, however, abolished free higher education. That year, total enrollment was 96,600.

== Challenges, issues and concerns ==
Tajikistan's educational system suffers from a depleted infrastructure and an acute shortage of teachers at all levels, which will increase because of the relatively high birthrate. The state-supported Soviet system remains in place, but the poor condition of the national economy and years of civil war sharply reduced funding in the early 2000s; government spending, however, began to increase in 2004.

During a round table entitled "Education in the Period of Independence" held on December 2, 2010, in Dushanbe, the minister of education decreed that a 12-year educational system will be implemented in three phases. The first phase began during the 2010–2011 academic year, and the transition to a 12-year system was expected to be complete by 2016.

== See also ==
- Effects of economic liberalisation on education in Tajikistan
- List of universities in Tajikistan
