= Carole Martinez =

French novelist

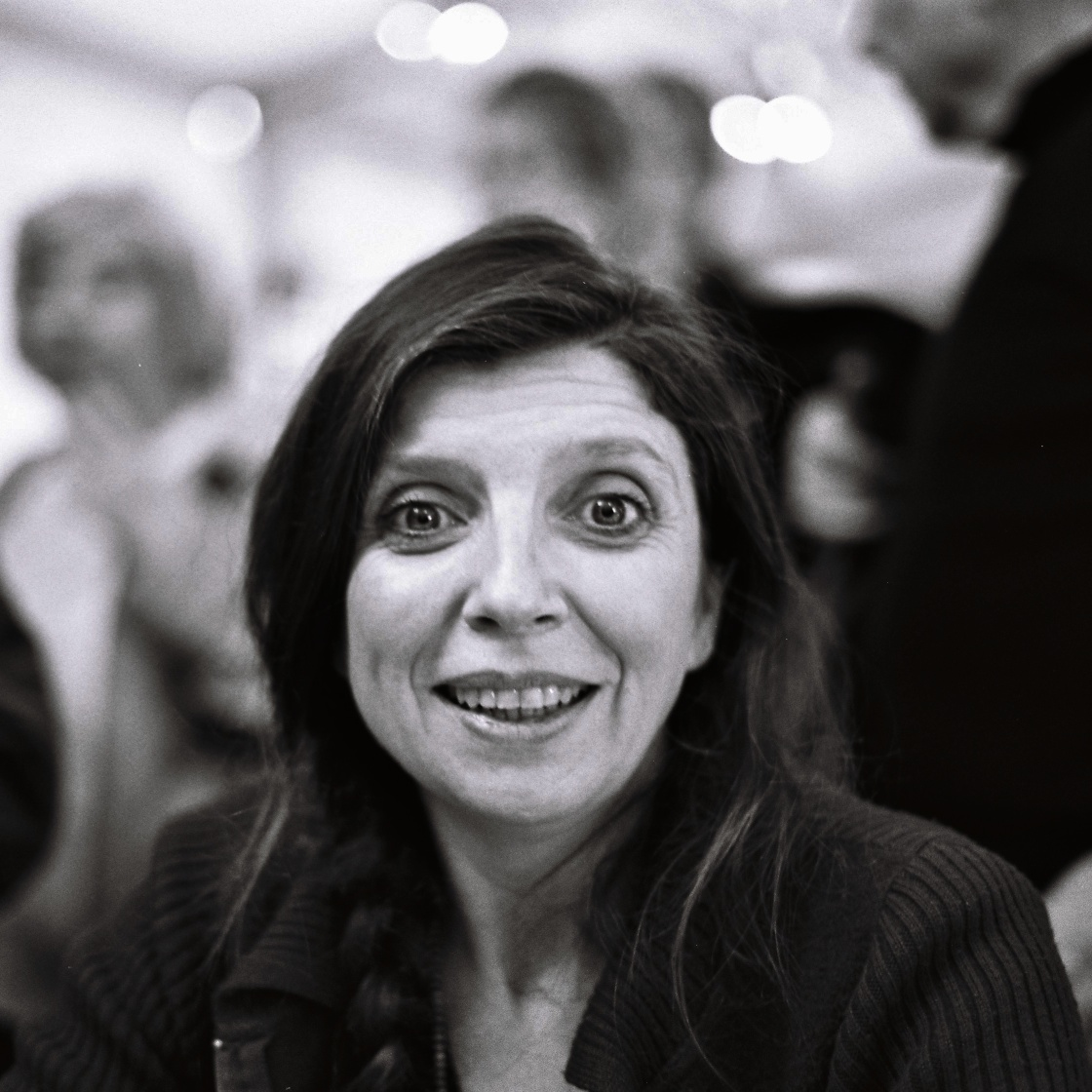
Carole Martinez at salon du livre Radio France, 26 November 2011

Carole Martinez (10 November 1966 in Créhange) is a French contemporary novelist.

== Biography ==
She was at a time tempted by theatre and created her troupe at age 20.

She is a teacher of French.

Her first novel, Le Cœur cousu, released discreetly in February 2007, received numerous prizes thereafter. Her second novel, Du domaine des Murmures, was short-listed for the prix Goncourt (the prize eventually went to L'Art français de la guerre by Alexis Jenni with five votes, and three to Carole Martinez). She finally was awarded the prix Goncourt des lycéens.

== Publications ==
Youth

- 1998: Le Cri du livre, Paris, Pocket, series "Jeunesse", 175 p. ISBN 978-2266079945. Reissued under the title L'Œil du témoin, Paris, éditions Rageot, series "Heure noire", 2011, 192 p. ISBN 978-2700236156

Novels

- 2007: Le Cœur cousu, Paris, éditions Gallimard, Collection Blanche, 430 p. ISBN 978-2070783052
  - The Threads of the Heart. Translated by Howard Curtis. Europa Editions. 2013. ISBN 9781609450878.

Prix Renaudot des lycéens (2007)
Prix Ulysse (2007)
Prix Emmanuel Roblès (2007)
Premier prix du Festival du Premier Roman de Chambéry (2007)
Bourse de la Découverte - Prix Découverte Prince Pierre de Monaco (2007)
Bourse Thyde Monnier (2007)
Prix des lycéens de Monaco

- 2011: Du domaine des Murmures, Paris, éditions Gallimard, Collection Blanche, 208 p. ISBN 978-2070131495
  - The Castle of Whispers. Translated by Howard Curtis. Europa Editions. 2014. ISBN 9781609451820.

Prix Goncourt des lycéens (2011)
Prix Marcel-Aymé (2012)

- 2015: La terre qui penche, Paris, éditions Gallimard, Collection Blanche, ISBN 9782070149926

Feuille d'or de la ville de Nancy

- 2020: Les roses fauves, Paris, éditions Gallimard, Collection Blanche, ISBN 9782072788918
- 2024: Dors ton sommeil de brute, Paris, éditions Gallimard, ISBN 9782072929861

Choix Goncourt de la Pologne (2024)
