= National Library of Tajikistan =

National library

- Китобхонаи миллии Тоҷикистон (Tajik); Национальная библиотека Таджикистана (Russian)
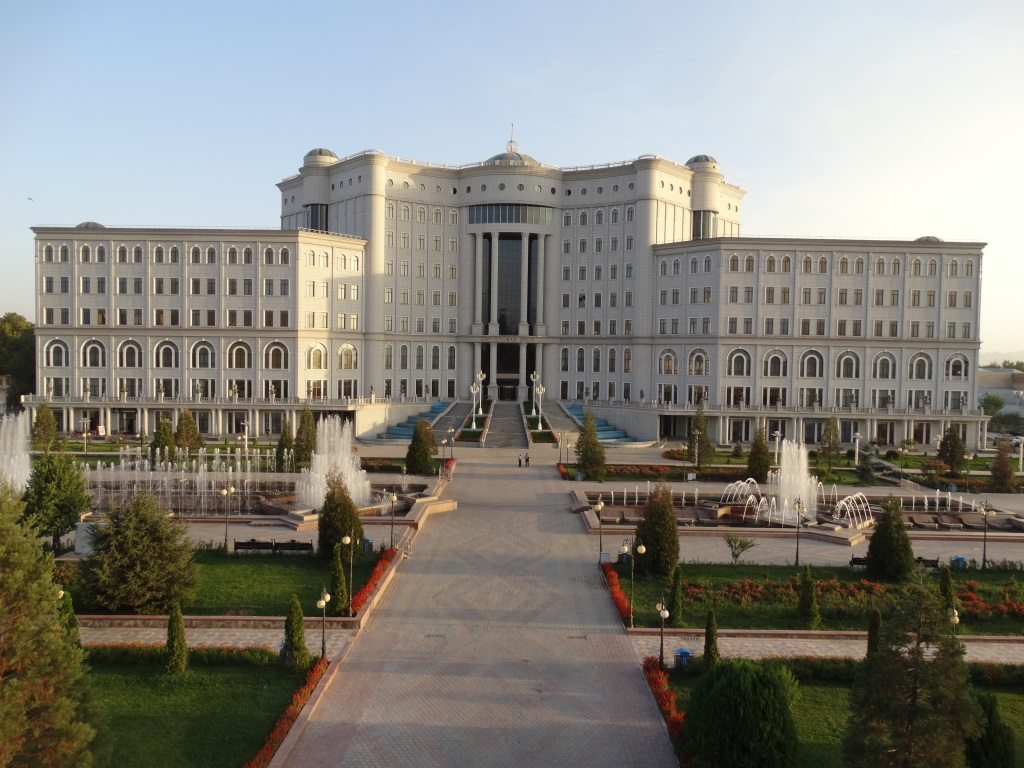
- Main building in Dushanbe
- 38°34′20″N 68°47′18″E
- Location: Tehron St. 6, Dushanbe, Tajikistan
- Type: National library
- Established: March 20, 2012 (14 years ago)

Collection
- Items collected: Books, journals, newspapers, magazines, official publications, sheet music, sound and music recordings, databases, maps, postage stamps, prints, drawings, manuscripts and media.
- Legal deposit: Yes

Other information
- Website: nlt.tj

The National Library of Tajikistan (NLT; Tajik: Китобхонаи миллии Тоҷикистон, romanized: Kitobkhonai millii Tojikiston, КМТ; Russian: Национальная библиотека Таджикистана, romanized: Natsional'naya biblioteka Tadzhikistana) located in Dushanbe, Tajikistan is the main library of the country, specialising in preserving cultural heritage of the peoples of the Republic of Tajikistan.

The National Library traces its origins to the State Public Library of the Tajik SSR, established in Dushanbe in 1933 and renamed after the Persian poet Ferdowsi a year later. The present nine storey National Library building was opened in 2012 under its current name, and features 15 reading halls as well as over 20 departments. Access to the library is free to any Tajik citizen with a passport, and an estimated 1,000 to 1,200 users visit the library every day.

== History ==
=== Soviet era ===
The origins of the National Library of Tajikistan date to the early Soviet period. It was established in Dushanbe, then known as Stalinabad, on 1 January 1933 as the State Public Library of the Tajik Soviet Socialist Republic (Tajik SSR). In May 1933, a collection of manuscripts held by the scientific research unit of the Tajik People's Commissariat for Education was transferred to the library, and a dedicated Department of Oriental Manuscripts commenced operations in 1934. The collection subsequently developed into an important repository of Persian, Tajik, Arabic and Turkic manuscripts and rare books.

In 1934, the library was renamed after the Persian poet Ferdowsi. In 1953, 3,290 manuscripts from the Ferdowsi National Library were transferred by government decree to the Tajik Academy of Sciences. Despite the transfer, the library continued to grow its manuscripts and lithographed collection in the following decades.

=== After independence ===
Following the independence of Tajikistan, the institution was granted the status of a national library in 1993. By 1999, its rare book collection reportedly comprised more than 16,000 items, including 2,206 manuscripts. Of these manuscripts, 1,494 were in Persian, 546 in Arabic and 166 in Turkic languages.

In 2007, President Emomali Rahmon commissioned the construction of a new purpose built national library near the Palace of the Nation and Rudaki Park in central Dushanbe. The foundation stone was laid on 4 September 2007, and the date was subsequently designated as Tajikistan's Day of the Book.

=== New library building ===
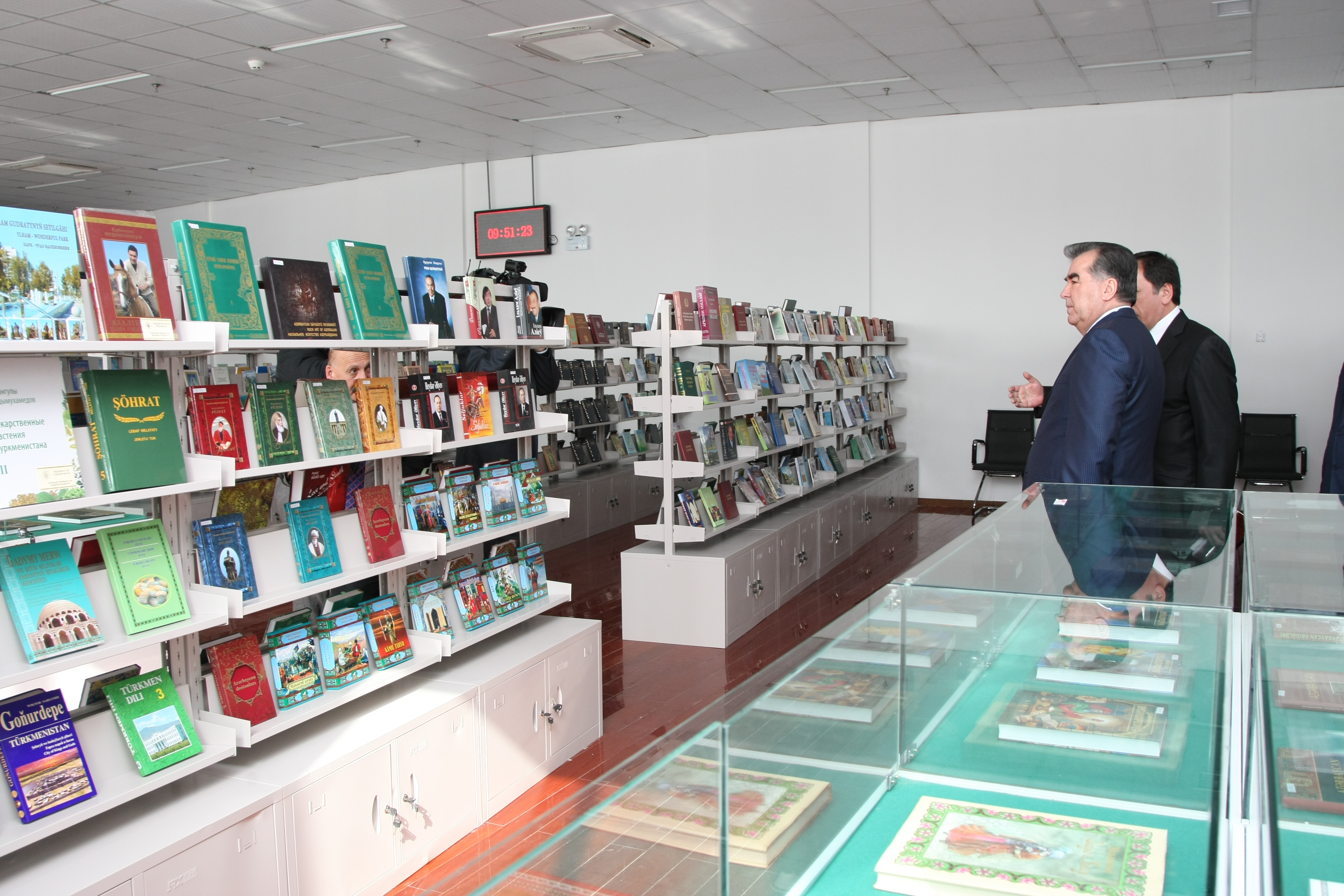
Visit to the new library building by President Emomali Rahmon

The new National Library of Tajikistan building was officially opened on 20 March 2012, the day before Nowruz, and the collections of the former Ferdowsi National Library were transferred to the new library. The former library building was subsequently converted into a children's library. At the time of the transfer, the manuscript collection contained approximately 2,267 manuscripts.

The new nine storey building was designed with the appearance of an open book. It measures approximately 167m in length and 52m in height, with a floor area of over 44,000 sqm. Its facade incorporates busts of 22 notable people associated with Tajik history, science and literature. It is described as the largest library facility in Central Asia at the time of its opening.

The relocation also accompanied an expansion of the library's digital and information services. Electronic cataloguing and digital library systems were introduced, alongside programmes for digitising manuscripts, rare books and historical periodicals. The library subsequently developed access to electronic databases and digital collections as part of a broader effort to preserve and improve access to Tajikistan's heritage.

== Collections ==
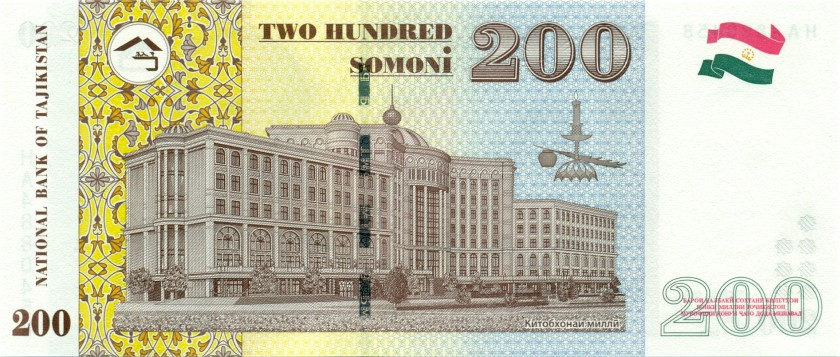
The library featured on the back of a TJS 200 banknote

The library's collection focuses on works of national significance to the Tajik people, as well as internationally recognised works by Tajik authors. Its collection places particular emphasis on classical literature, including the works of Ferdowsi. The library also features a digital collection known as the "Tajikistan National Electric Library" which is free to citizens within Tajikistan.

== Directors ==
- Lutfiya Abdulkholiqzoda - Director
- Saidjaf'ar Safarov - First Deputy Director
- Gadobek Mahmudov - Deputy Director
- Salima Rajabova - Deputy Director
