= Prix Carbet de la Caraïbe et du Tout-Monde =

- Awarded for: Best literary work in French or French Creole from the Caribbean or the Americas
- Presented by: Institut du Tout-Monde
- Reward: €5,000
- First award: 1990
- Currently held by: Le Rêve de William Alexander Brown by Gerty Dambury
- Website: Prix Carbet de la Caraïbe et du Tout-Monde

The Prix Carbet de la Caraïbe et du Tout-Monde (or, the Prix Carbet of the Caribbean and Tout-Monde) is an annual award given to the best literary work in French or French Creole from the Caribbean and the Americas.

== History ==
The Prix Carbet de la Caraïbe et du Tout-Monde was founded at the initiative of the Carbet journal in 1990. It aims to promote creole writing and to contribute to a better understanding of the processes of creolization. It rewards works depicting the unity and diversity of the cultures of the Caribbean and the Americas. It is awarded annually in December. As of 2013 it is worth €5000.

Between 1994 and 2006, the prize was administered by Gérard Delver and the Association Tout-Monde de Guadeloupe. From 2007, it has been administered by the Institut du Tout-Monde.

The prize ceremony rotates between Guadeloupe, French Guiana, Martinique and Île-de-France.

== Rules ==
Works in any genre are acceptable to compete for the award. They should have been published between 1 October of the previous year and 30 September of the year of award. They should have been written either in French or Creole, or translated into these languages. The deadline for submission is 1 October of the year of award.

The jury meets in camera in December, and the announcement of the award is made the same month.

== Jury ==
From inception till 2011, the prize was managed by Edouard Glissant, who selected and presided over the jury. In 2011, Patrick Chamoiseau was elected as the president of the prize.

From 1989 to 2009, Maximilien Laroche was one of the members of the jury.

Since 2013, the jury has been composed of:

- Ernest Pépin (Guadeloupe), Jury President
- Patrick Chamoiseau (Martinique)
- Rodolphe Alexandre (French Guiana)
- Michael Dash (Trinidad)
- Samia Kassab-Charfi (Tunisia)
- Diva Damato Barbaro (Brazil)
- Miguel Duplan (Martinique)
- Lise Gauvin (Quebec)
- Nancy Morejon (Cuba)
- Romuald Fonkoua (Paris)
- Évelyne Trouillot (Haiti)

== Controversy ==
In 2009, Edouard Glissant and the award committee announced that they would give the prize not to a book or an oeuvre of an author, but rather for a "lifetime of work, possibly to the work of the spirit", and awarded it to an anti-colonial civil servant, Alain Plénel. The decision raised questions about the suitability of a politician for a literary award.

== Winners ==
Year	Author(s)	Work	English	Ref.(s)
1990	Patrick Chamoiseau	Antan d'Enfance	Childhood (trans. Carol Volk)	
1991	Dany Laferrière	L'odeur du café	An Aroma of Coffee (trans. David Homel)	
1992	Daniel Boukman	Pawol bwa sèk		
1993	Gisele Pineau	La Grande Drive des esprits	The Drifting of Spirits (trans. Michael Dash)	
1994	Raphaël Confiant	L'allée des Soupirs		
1995	Émile Ollivier	Les Urnes Scellées		
1996	Félix Morisseau-Leroy	For collected works		
1997	Maryse Condé	Desirada	Desirada (trans. Richard Philcox)	
1998	René Depestre	For collected works		
1999	Edwidge Danticat	La récolte douce des larmes (trans. Jacques Chabert)	The Farming of Bones	
2000	Jacqueline Picard	O fugitif		
2001	Serge Patient	For collected works		
2002	Frankétienne	H'éros-chimères		
2003	Monchoachi	For collected works		
2004	Jamaica Kincaid	Mr. Potter (trans. Juan Castillo Plaza)	Mr. Potter	
2005	Henri Corbin	Sinon l'enfance		
2006	Georges Castera	Le trou de souffleur and L'Encre est ma demeure		
2007	Miguel Duplan	L'Acier		
2008	Simone Schwarz-Bart, André Schwarz-Bart	For collected works		
2009	Alain Plénel	For anti-colonialism and humanism		
2010	Evelyne Trouillot	La mémoire aux Abois		
2011	Leonardo Padura	L'homme qui aimait les chiens (trans. René Solis, Elena Zayas)	The Man Who Loved Dogs (trans. Anna Kushner)	
2012	Karla Suarez	La Havane, année zéro (trans. François Gaudry)		
2013	Lyonel Trouillot	Parabole du failli		
2014	Fabienne Kanor	Faire l'aventure		
2015	Gerty Dambury	Le Rêve de William Alexander Brown		
2016	Anthony Phelps	For collected works		
2017	Kei Miller	By the rivers of Babylon		
2018	Estelle-Sarah Bulle	Là où les chiens aboient par la queue		
