= Émile Ollivier (writer) =

Haitian-born educator and writer

- Born: 19 February 1940; Port-au-Prince, Haiti
- Died: 10 November 2002 (aged 62); Montreal, Quebec, Canada
- Occupations: Educator; writer;professor
- Known for: Leading Haitian-Canadian writer; professor of andragogy at Université de Montréal
- Awards: Chevalier of the National Order of Quebec (1993); Chevalier of the Ordre des Arts et des Lettres (2000)

Émile Ollivier (February 19, 1940 – November 10, 2002) was a Haitian-born educator and writer living in Quebec, Canada. He was considered one of the most important Haitian writers of his time.

He was born in Port-au-Prince and, after studying at the Lycée in Port-au-Prince, went on to study philosophy at the École normale supérieure d'Haïti and literature and psychology in France. Following the rise to power by François Duvalier, Ollivier left Haiti for France in 1964. In 1965, he came to Quebec, first settling in Amos in the Abitibi-Témiscamingue region, where he taught school, and later moving to Montreal. Ollivier worked as a coordinator for the Quebec Ministry of Education from 1973 to 1976. From 1977 to 1980, he was an administrator at the Université du Québec à Montréal. He was a professor of andragogy in the Education Sciences department of the Université de Montréal for 25 years.

He married Marie-José Glémaud.

In 1993, Ollivier was named a Chevalier in the National Order of Quebec. In 2000, he was named a Chevalier in the French Ordre des Arts et des Lettres and was named a member of the Académie des lettres du Québec.

He died in Montreal at the age of 62. He was entombed at the Sainte-Marguerite-d'Youville Mausoleum at the Notre Dame des Neiges Cemetery in Montreal.

The Prix Émile-Ollivier was established by the Quebec Conseil supérieur de la langue française in 2004 and was awarded until 2014.

== Selected works ==
- 1946/1976: Trente ans de Pouvoir Noir en Haïti, essay (1976), with Cary Hector and Claude Moïse
- Paysage de l'aveugle, stories (1977)
- Mère-solitude, novel (1983), received the Prix Jacques Roumain
- La discorde aux cents voix, novel (1986), received the Grand Prix de la prose from Le Journal de Montréal
- Passages, novel (1991), received the Grand prix du livre de Montréal
- Repenser Haïti; grandeur et misères d'un mouvement démocratique, essay (1992), with Claude Moïse
- Les urnes scellées, novel (1995), received the Prix Carbet de la Caraïbe et du Tout-Monde
- Mille Eaux, novel (1999)
- Repérages, essay (2001), was a finalist for a Governor General's Award for Literary Merit
- La Brûlerie, novel (2005), published after his death
