= Silencing the Past =

1995 history book by Michel-Rolph Trouillot

- Author: Michel-Rolph Trouillot
- Subject: History
- Genre: Non-fiction
- Publisher: Beacon Press
- Publication date: 1995
- ISBN: 0807080535

Silencing the Past: Power and the Production of History is a 1995 history book by Haitian historian Michel-Rolph Trouillot. The 2015 edition features a foreword by Hazel V. Carby on the impact of Trouillot's work on postcolonial studies.

== Synopsis ==
Silencing the Past is a meditation on the characteristics of power and how it influences the creation and recording of histories. Spanning examples from The Alamo and Christopher Columbus to the position of the Haitian Revolution in the collective memory of Western society, Trouillot analyzes conventional historical narratives to understand why certain parts of history are remembered when others are not.

=== Contents ===
Trouillot's book features a brief prologue and an epilogue in addition to its five core chapters:

1. The Power in the Story
2. The Three Faces of Sans Souci
3. An Unthinkable History
4. Good Day, Columbus
5. The Presence in the Past

== Reception ==
The book was well received upon its release, with Kenneth Maxwell calling it a "beautifully written, superior book." The American Historical Review said the book was "written with clarity, wit, and style throughout." Eric R. Wolf called it "a beautifully written book" in which Trouillot "interrogates history, to ask how histories are, in fact, produced."

In the twentieth-anniversary edition, the foreword by Hazel V. Carby describes the book's utility as a pedagogical tool, offering an introduction to historical analysis for students. In an article for the Journal of Haitian Studies, Alyssa Goldstein Sepinwall notes that Silencing the Past is regarded as Trouillot's most famous work.

Silencing the Past was used as one of the bases for Raoul Peck's HBO miniseries, Exterminate All the Brutes. The miniseries was released in 2021 to critical acclaim.
