= Economic liberalization in the post–World War II era =

After World War II, many countries adopted policies of economic liberalization in order to stimulate their economies.

The period directly after the war did not see many, the most notable exception being West Germany's reforms of 1948, which set the stage for the Wirtschaftswunder in the 1950s and helped inform many of the liberalisations that were to come.

However, it was not until the 1970s that the stagflation of the period forced many countries to look for new economic systems. The emergence of neoliberalism and other associated economically liberal doctrines saw a wave of economic liberalisations sweeping the globe.

Starting with Chile in 1975, various governments adopted and implemented liberal policy. The most important of these were Ronald Reagan and Margaret Thatcher, who developed the initial wave of neoliberal thought in practise.

Chronic economic crisis throughout the 1980s and the collapse of the Communist bloc at the end of the 1980s, helped foster political opposition to state interventionism in favor of unregulated market reform policies. From the 1980s onward, a number of communist and socialist countries initiated various neoliberal market reforms, such as the Socialist Federal Republic of Yugoslavia under the direction of Ante Marković (until the country's collapse in the early 1990s), and the People's Republic of China under the direction of Deng Xiaoping.

In the 1990s, a second more socially-liberal wave of liberalisation swept the world under Bill Clinton and Tony Blair.

== Post-WWII economic liberalism ==
=== West Germany ===
==== Background ====
Germany ended the European theatre of World War II with its unconditional surrender on 8 May 1945. It faced war damage to its economy and the problems of mass migration due to the expulsion of ethnic Germans from areas east of the Oder–Neisse line.

April 1945 to July 1947 saw the Allied occupation of Germany implement Joint Chiefs of Staff directive 1067 (JCS 1067). The aim of this directive was to transfer Germany's economy from one centred on heavy industry to a pastoral one, in order to prevent Germany from having the capacity to wage war. Civilian industries which might have a military potential, which in the modern era of "total war" included virtually all, were to be severely restricted. The restriction of the latter was set to Germany's "approved peacetime needs", which were defined to be set on the average European standard. In order to achieve this, each type of industry was subsequently reviewed to see how many factories Germany required under these minimum level of industry requirements. In May 1946, the first plan stated that German heavy industry was to be lowered to 50% of its 1938 levels by the destruction of 1,500 listed manufacturing plants. Restrictions on steel followed.

It soon became obvious that this policy was not sustainable. Germany could not grow enough food for itself and malnutrition was becoming increasingly common. The European post-war economic recovery did not materialise and it became increasingly obvious that the European economy had depended on German industry.

In July 1947, President Harry S. Truman rescinded on "national security grounds" the punitive JCS 1067, which had directed the U.S. forces of occupation in Germany to "take no steps looking toward the economic rehabilitation of Germany." It was replaced by JCS 1779, which instead stressed that "[a]n orderly, prosperous Europe requires the economic contributions of a stable and productive Germany."

By 1948, Germany suffered from rampant hyperinflation. The currency of the time (the Reichsmark) had no public confidence, and thanks to that and price controls, black market trading boomed and bartering proliferated. Banks were over their heads in debt and surplus currency abounded.

However, thanks to the introduction of JCS 1779 and the first Allied attempts to set up German governance, something could be done about this. Ludwig Erhard, an economist, who had spent much time working on the problem of post war recovery, had worked his way up the administration created by the occupying American forces until he became the Director of Economics in the Bizonal Economic Council in the joint British and American occupied zones (which would later, with the addition of the French occupied territory become the basis for West Germany). He was placed in charge of currency reform and became a central figure in events that were to follow.

==== Economic reforms ====
In spring of 1948, the Allies decided to reform the currency. In preparation for this, a new central bank system was established in West Germany with independent Land Central Banks and the Bank deutscher Lander with headquarters in Frankfurt am Main.

Currency reform took effect on 20 June 1948, through the introduction of the Deutsche Mark to replace the Reichsmark and by transferring to the Bank deutscher Lander the sole right to print money. Each person received a per capita allowance of 60 DM, payable in two instalments (40 DM and 20 DM) and business quota of 60 DM per employee.

Under the German Currency Conversion Law on 27 June, private non-bank credit balances were converted at a rate of 10 RM to 1 DM, with half remaining in a frozen bank account. Although the money stock was very small in terms of national product, the adjustment in the price structure immediately led to sharp price increases, fuelled by the high velocity of money through the system. As a result, on 4 October, the military governments wiped out 70% of the remaining frozen balances, resulting in an effective exchange of 10:0.65. Holders of financial assets (including many small-time savers) were dispossessed and the banks' debt in Reichsmarks was eliminated, transferred instead into claims on the Lander and later the Federal Government. Wages, rents, pensions and other recurring liabilities were transferred at 1:1.

On the day of the currency reform, Ludwig Erhard announced, despite the reservations of the Allies, that rationing would be considerably relaxed and price controls abolished.

==== Results ====
In the short term, the currency reforms and abolition of price controls helped end hyperinflation. The new currency enjoyed considerable confidence and was accepted by the public as a medium of payment. The currency reforms had ensured that money was once more scarce, and the relaxation of price controls created incentives for production, sales and earning this money. The removal of price controls also meant shops filled up with goods again, which was a huge psychological factor in the adoption of the new currency.

In the long term, these reforms helped set the stage for the Wirtschaftswunder (German for economic miracle) in the 1950s.

== Post-1970s economic liberalism ==
Neoliberalism ultimately developed through two major phases. The first phase carried out through the help of Ronald Reagan and Margaret Thatcher, and the second phase through Bill Clinton and Tony Blair.

Chronic economic crisis throughout the 1980s and the collapse of the Communist bloc at the end of the 1980s, helped foster political opposition to state interventionism in favor of unregulated market reform policies. From the 1980s onward, a number of communist and socialist countries initiated various neoliberal market reforms, such as the Socialist Federal Republic of Yugoslavia under the direction of Ante Marković (until the country's collapse in the early 1990s), and the People's Republic of China under the direction of Deng Xiaoping.

Changes occurred from the 1970s to the 1980s. Starting off with most of the democratic world, governments focused primarily on the primacy of economic individual rights, the rule of law and the role of governments in moderating relative unregulated trade. It was almost considered national self-determination at the time.

The status of organized labour shifted when the governments of Ronald Reagan and Margaret Thatcher took strong stances to break down trade barriers entirely to reduce government power; thus allowing the market to be more important. Therefore, industries will increasingly shift globally with integrated knowledge boosting the economy.

=== Australia ===
In Australia, neoliberal economic policies have been embraced by governments of both the Labor Party and the Liberal Party since 1983. The governments of Bob Hawke and Paul Keating from 1983 to 1996 pursued economic liberalisation and a program of micro-economic reform. These governments privatized government corporations, deregulated factor markets, floated the Australian dollar and reduced trade protection.

In addition to Labor's neoliberal agenda, Keating, as federal treasurer, also implemented a compulsory superannuation guarantee system in 1992 to increase national savings and reduce future government liability for old age pensions. The financing of universities was decentralised, requiring students to contribute to university fees through a repayable loan system known as the Higher Education Contribution Scheme (HECS) and, in the mid-1990s, encouraging universities to increase income by admitting full-fee-paying students, including foreign students. The admitting of domestic full-fee-paying students to public universities was discontinued in 2009 by the Rudd Labor Government.

When the Liberal Party returned to power in March 1996 under prime minister John Howard, the programme of economic liberalisation was continued with the privatisation of more government corporations, notably the sale of the telecommunications provider Telstra and the Reserve Bank of Australia was made independent of the government in determining monetary policy. In addition to the neoliberal agenda, the Liberal government increased taxation through a 10% Goods and Services Tax GST (similar to European VAT). It was introduced with the aim of combining and simplifying the previous duties and taxes and to flatten the tax base. A series of reforms were enacted to empower capital in the labour market but these reforms were largely through additional legislative restrictions on labour and not through labour market deregulation.

=== Canada ===
In Canada, the issues identified with neoliberalism (reducing taxes and welfare spending, minimizing of government and reform of public healthcare and education, among others) are often associated with Brian Mulroney, Jean Chrétien, Paul Martin, Mike Harris, Ralph Klein, Gordon Campbell and Stephen Harper.

Ralph Klein, who supports and has supported extraction of Alberta's vast oil and natural gas reserves, is credited by the Pembina Institute as generating a relatively small amount of provincial revenue compared to the increase in oil sand production. Between 1995 and 2004, production grew by 133%, but government revenue shrank by 30%, leaving large fortunes in the hands of corporations.

Under Mike Harris in Ontario during the 1990s, industry and social responsibilities were transferred to the cities. Toronto during this time was forced to amalgamate and enter a period of development. The Amalgamation of Toronto was intended as a cost-saving measure and, in 2000, Michael R. Garrett noted a yearly savings of $136.2 million (CDN) However, in 2007, Barry Hertz reported in the conservative national newspaper National Post that cost savings never materialized. He also noted that government staff had grown, with the city employing 4,015 more people in 2007 than it did in 1998.

Canadian politics were also affected. Trade tariffs were ended, allowing less restrictions on trade. Government sizes were decreased limiting their power towards industries. The federal government rules during that time and municipalities had no power.

=== Chile ===
Milton Friedman used the term "Miracle of Chile" in reference to Augusto Pinochet's support for liberal economic changes in Chile carried out by the "Chicago Boys". Their implemented economic model had three main objectives: economic liberalization, privatization of state owned companies, and stabilization of inflation. These market-oriented economic policies were continued and strengthened by successive governments after Pinochet stepped down. At the time, Milton Friedman stated that the Chilean experiment was "comparable to the economic miracle of post-war Germany."

Some of Pinochet's neoliberal policies were continued after the termination of his 17-year-long dictatorship, though with more social policies to counter the great social-economic inequality. In 2007, according to The Heritage Foundation and The Wall Street Journal, Chile was the world's 11th "most free" economy, and third-freest in the Americas.

According to the United Nations Development Report of 2009 Chile has high competitiveness, quality of life, political stability, globalization, economic freedom, low perception of corruption and comparatively low poverty rates.

According to the International Monetary Fund Chile "ranks high regionally" in freedom of the press, human development and democratic development. Also according to the IMF Chile has the region's highest GDP to popular ratio (at market prices and purchasing power parity) and also has a high degree of income inequality, as measured by the Gini index.

The experience of Chile in the 1970s and 1980s, and especially the export of the Chilean pension model by former Labor Minister José Piñera, has influenced the policies of the Chinese Communist Party and has been invoked as a model by economic reformers in other countries, such as Boris Yeltsin in Russia and almost all Eastern European post-Communist societies.

Mining of copper in Chile is publicly owned (see Chilean nationalization of copper). Chile is the world's top producer of copper, which is by far the largest Chilean export good (accounting for over 40% of export revenue).

=== China ===
In China, both top down state led and bottom up economic reforms contributed to economic liberalization in the post-Mao era called the reform and opening up. The first wave of state led reforms started in 1976 under Hua Guofeng. After 1978 when Deng Xiaoping and Chen Yun came to power a second round of Beijing-led reform involved decentralizing fiscal policy to provinces, decentralization of foreign trade, the creation of Special Economic Zones, and the resumption of private agriculture, which became official policy after 1982. The 1990s saw price reforms, tax reforms, privatization of state owned enterprises and emerging inter-regional competition among provinces and municipalities. Many observers emphasize the role of Deng Xiaoping's southern tour in 1992 in unlocking a second wave of liberalization and activity.

=== Hong Kong ===
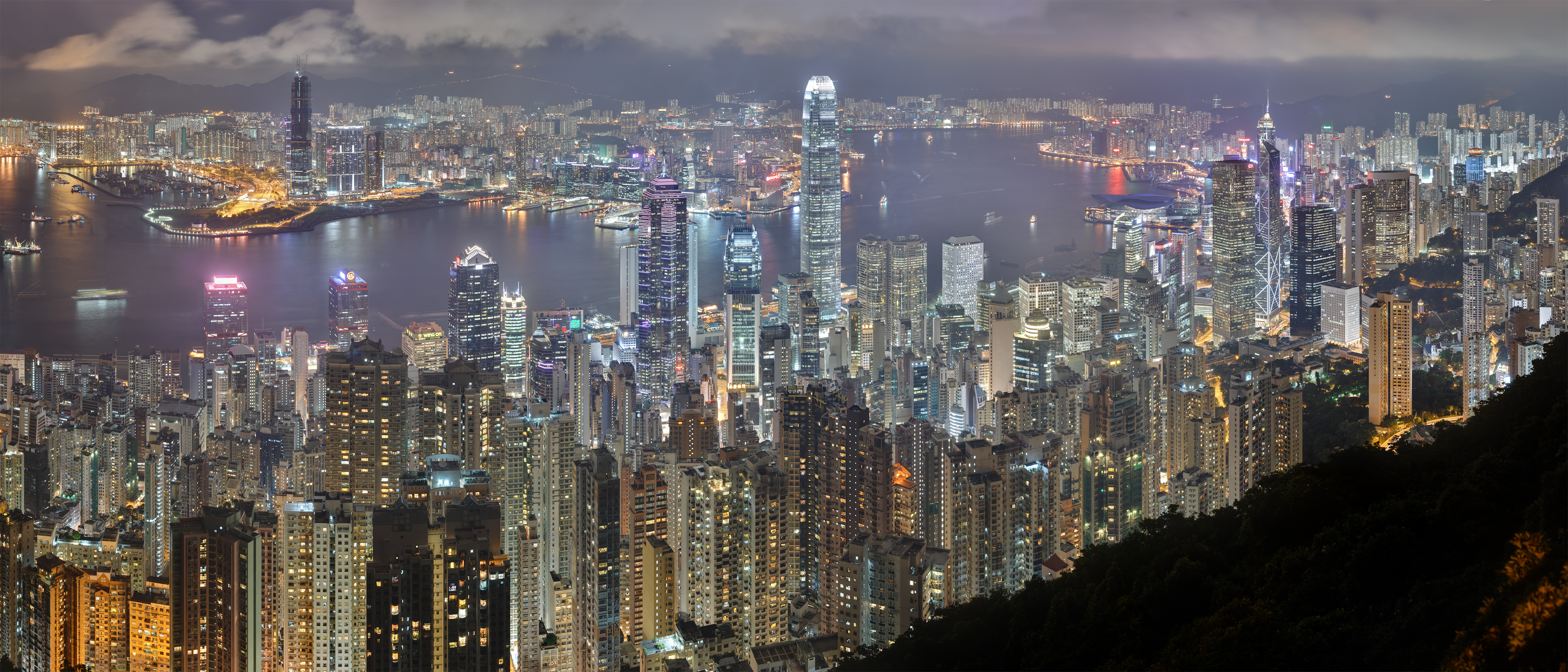
Hong Kong practices relatively laissez-faire policies.

Milton Friedman described Hong Kong as a laissez-faire state and he credits that policy for the rapid move from poverty to prosperity in 50 years. Hong Kong's GDP grew rapidly under British colonial control between 1897 and 1997, while possessing some government intervention in the form of monetary, school and environmental regulations and some government ownership of housing. These regulations were however light in comparison to many other countries, and in terms of economic regulation Friedman's analysis of Hong Kong as a 'laissez-faire' state seems justified: Hong Kong has no capital gains tax, no interest tax, no sales tax and only a 15% flat income tax. It also has no tariffs or other legal restrictions on international trade, no minimum wage laws (until 2010) and no price or wage controls. Further it extends no unemployment benefits, enacts no labour legislation, provides no social security and no national health insurance.

A 1994 World Bank report stated that Hong Kong's GDP per capita grew in real terms at an annual rate of 6.5% from 1965 to 1989, a consistent growth percentage over a span of almost 25 years By 1990 Hong Kong's per capita income officially surpassed that of the ruling United Kingdom. In 1960 the average per capita income in Hong Kong was 28% of that in Great Britain; by 1996, it had risen to 137% of that in Britain.

Since 1995, Hong Kong has been ranked as having the world's most liberal capital markets by The Heritage Foundation and The Wall Street Journal. The Fraser Institute concurred in 2007.

=== Japan ===
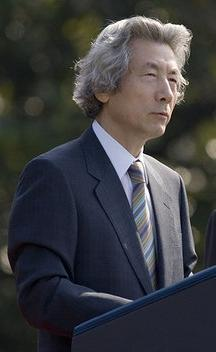
Junichiro Koizumi, a popular Japanese leader who fought for privatization.

The largest privatization in history was that of Japan Post. It was the nation's largest employer and one third of all Japanese government employees worked for Japan Post.

In September 2003, Koizumi's cabinet proposed splitting Japan Post into four separate companies: a bank, an insurance company, a postal service company, and a fourth company to handle the post offices as retail storefronts of the other three. After privatization was rejected by upper house, Koizumi scheduled nationwide elections to be held on 11 September 2005. He declared the election to be a referendum on postal privatization. Koizumi subsequently won this election, gaining the necessary supermajority and a mandate for reform, and in October 2005, the bill was passed to privatize Japan Post in 2007.

=== Mexico ===
Mexico is presently the eighth largest trading nation. Mexico joined GATT, or General Agreement on Tariffs and Trade in 1986 and has been a part of the North America Free Trade Agreement (NAFTA) since 1990. Another trading partnership Mexico entered into was the Uruguay Round (UR).

The reforms brought about by NAFTA resulted in a huge opening of the Mexican economy and "increased the political and economic costs of trade policy reversals and restrained trade policy with other countries to compatibility with (if not subservience to) NAFTA", (Mena, 48). Tariffs were reduced across most sectors of the economy. They also opened the door for factories along the border of the US and Mexico. Maquiladoras account for most of the Mexican export market. A reform of the 1973 Foreign Investment Law, "Foreign Investment is not allowed in oil production or refining." (Mena, p. 49).

Mexico benefited greatly from its relationship with the UR and the WTO. There were low tariffs on Mexican goods and Mexico was not bound to alter its tariffs for UR members. "Mexico's preferences on non-agricultural subsidies were largely borne out in the URAs", (Ortiz Mena, 60). Mexico continues to have restrictions on foreign ownership and has been criticized for not signing the Agreement on Government Procurement. NGOs are also critical of the reforms that had been made.

After joining NAFTA, Mexico entered into over thirty Free Trade Agreements (FTA). Mexico also signed FTAs with the European Union (EU), European Free Trade Agreement (EFTA) and Japan. As a result of these agreements, exports increased, manufactured goods became more important and Mexico became the US's second largest trading partner.

The Mexican government feels that the benefits of liberalism have been slowed due to a lack of implementations of URA policies by developed countries. The government fears that environmental and labor issues might affect the trade agenda. They are looking to the developed nations to help with a clean transition to the post-Doha work program. There are eleven areas that Mexico will focus on in the future: agriculture, export subsidies, TRIM, Service, IPR, dispute settlements, FDI, competition policy, government procurement, industrial goods, and labor and environment. Also, Mexico seeks to improve access for its important exports by complying fully with URAs.

=== New Zealand ===
The term Rogernomics was created by analogy with Reaganomics to describe the economic policies followed by New Zealand Finance Minister Roger Douglas from his appointment in 1984.

The policies included cutting agricultural subsidies and trade barriers, privatising public assets and the control of inflation through measures rooted in monetarism, and were regarded by many as a betrayal of traditional Labour ideals. The Labour Party subsequently retreated from pure Rogernomics, which became a core doctrine of the more right-wing ACT party. Roger Douglas planned to create a 15% flat tax in New Zealand, and to privatise schools, roads and hospitals, which was moderated by the Labour cabinet at the time, although the resultant reforms were still generally considered radical in a global context. After Douglas left the Labour party, he went on to co-found ACT in 1993, which regards itself as the new liberal party of New Zealand.

Since 1984, government subsidies including those for agriculture have been eliminated; import regulations have been reduced; exchange rates have been floated; controls on interest rates, wages, and prices have been removed; and marginal rates of taxation reduced. Tight monetary policy and major efforts to reduce the government budget deficit brought the inflation rate down from an annual rate of more than 18% in 1987. The Deregulation of government-owned enterprises in the 1980s and 1990s reduced government's role in the economy and permitted the retirement of some public debt, but simultaneously massively increased the necessity for greater welfare spending and has led to considerably higher rates of unemployment than were standard in New Zealand in earlier decades. However, unemployment in New Zealand lowered again by 2006–2007, hovering around 3.5% to 4%.

Deregulation created a very business-friendly regulatory framework. A survey 2008 study ranked it 99.9% in "Business freedom", and 80% overall in "Economic freedom", noting amongst other things that it only takes 12 days to establish a business in New Zealand on average, compared with a worldwide average of 43 days. Other indicators measured were property rights, labour market conditions, government controls and corruption, the last being considered "next to non-existent" in The Heritage Foundation and The Wall Street Journal study.

In its Doing Business 2008 survey, the World Bank, which that year rated New Zealand as the second-most business-friendly country worldwide, gave New Zealand rank 13 out of 178 in the business-friendliness of its hiring laws.

New Zealanders have a high level of life satisfaction as measured by international surveys; this is despite lower GDP per-head levels than many other OECD countries. The country was ranked 20th on the 2006 Human Development Index, which also accounts for non-economic factors such as literacy and public health, and 15th in The Economist's 2005 worldwide quality-of-life index. The country was further ranked 1st in life satisfaction and 5th in overall prosperity in the 2007 Legatum Institute prosperity index. In addition, the 2007 Mercer Quality of Living Survey ranked Auckland 5th place and Wellington 12th place in the world on its list.

=== Scandinavia ===
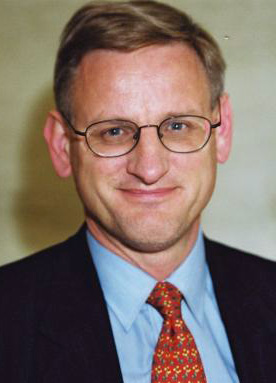
Carl Bildt's government liberalized Sweden's capital flows and privatized public services.

Scandinavian countries have embraced many neoliberal policies.

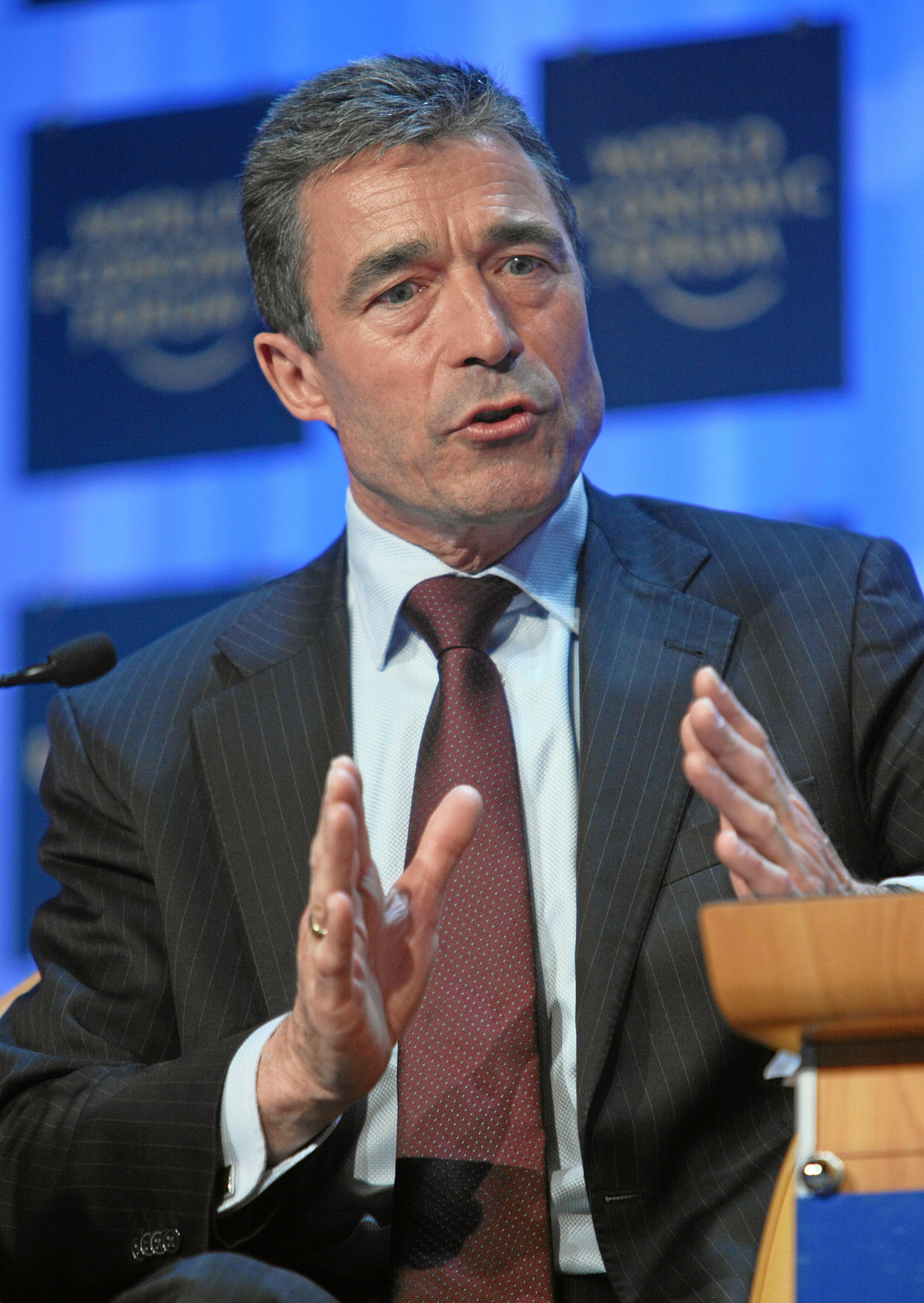
Anders Fogh Rasmussen, former Prime Minister of Denmark.

Anders Fogh Rasmussen, former Prime Minister of Denmark and leader of Venstre, has written books advocating minimal state influence on market activities. Denmark is a European leader on economic freedom indices. Denmark has ranked as the world's 11th "most free" economy, of 162 countries, in an index created by The Wall Street Journal and The Heritage Foundation, the Index of Economic Freedom 2008, while keeping at the same time a huge public sector (58.4% of GDP), the highest tax burden among developed countries (48.2% of GDP) and an extremely dense social security net (Flexicurity).

In Sweden, Carl Bildt's government program was one of liberalizing the Swedish economy, privatizing public services and making the country a member of the European Union. Carl Bildt signed the accession treaty at the European Union summit of Corfu, Greece on 23 June 1994. Economic changes were enacted, such as voucher schools, liberalized markets for telecommunications and energy as well as the privatization of publicly owned companies. The Bildt government made it possible for counties to privatize health care (although few did), contributing to liberalizing the Swedish economy. Privatization of state owned companies and deregulation of business were also carried out by the following social democratic governments.

Iceland began implementing neoliberal economic policies beginning in the late 1980s. As measured by the Economic Freedom of the World, it had the 53rd "freest economy" in 1975 and it was one of the poorest countries in Europe. In 2004, it had the 9th freest economy and it was one of the richest. However, by 2009, the country was facing severe financial problems, a consequence that a number of observers have attributed to Iceland's extensive deregulation.

=== South Africa ===
South Africa's GDP has grown since the beginning of the new government system in 1994, which ended the rule of apartheid in South Africa. While some see the implementation of neoliberal policies inside South Africa as having spurred the country's growth rate, others cite policies such as maintaining high interests rates to quell inflation as actually hurting economic growth. Meanwhile, the implementation of GEAR (Growth Employment and Redistribution Strategy) policies have caused a decline in employment that started after the new government in 1994, which caused an increase in South Africa's poverty level.

=== United Kingdom ===
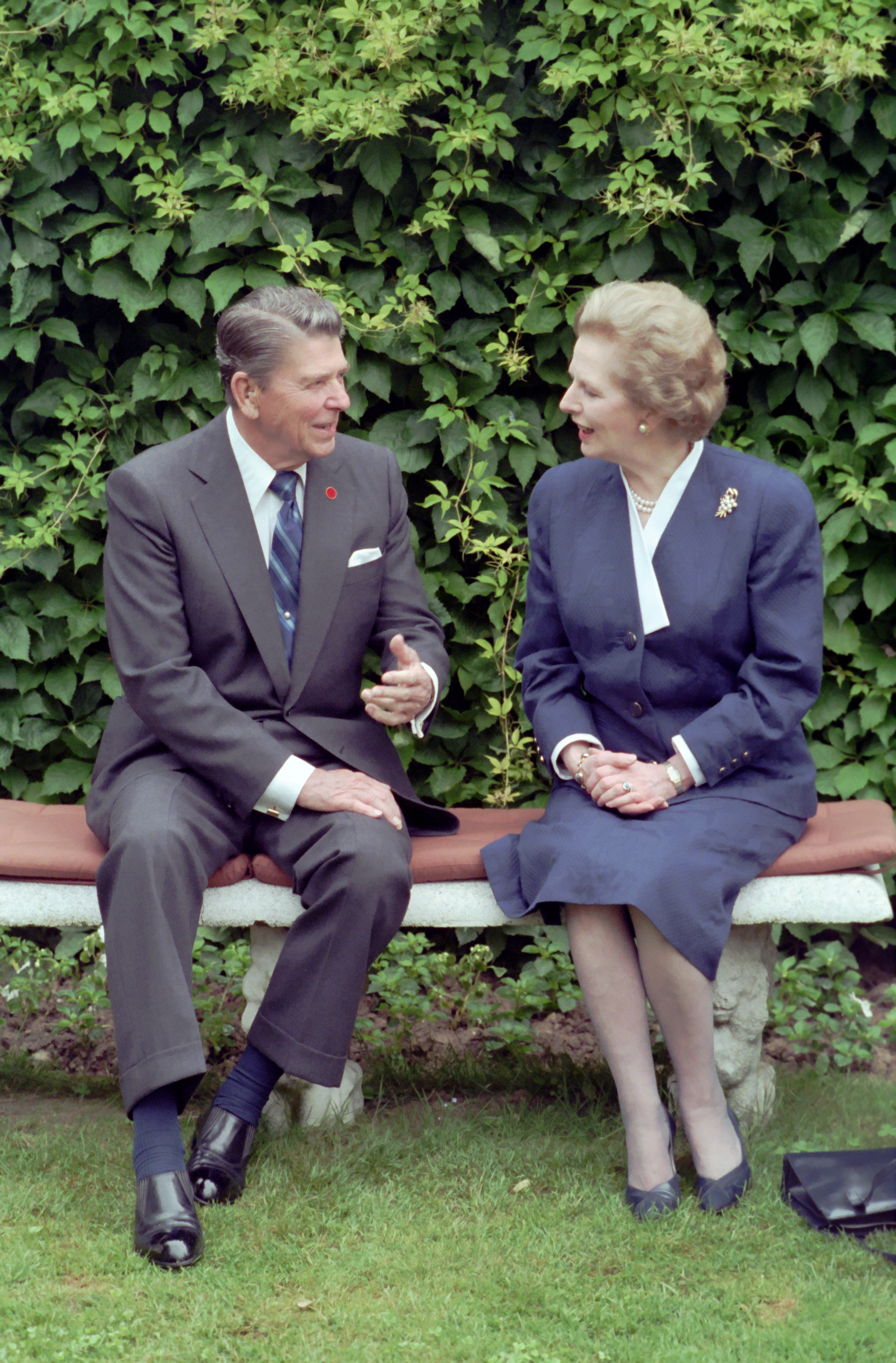
Margaret Thatcher and Ronald Reagan instituted economic liberal policies.

Coming to power in 1979, Margaret Thatcher's political and economic philosophy emphasised reduced state intervention, freer markets, and more entrepreneurialism. She once slammed a copy of Friedrich Hayek's The Constitution of Liberty down on a table during a Shadow Cabinet meeting, saying, "This is what we believe." Thinkers closely associated with Thatcherism include Keith Joseph, Friedrich Hayek and Milton Friedman.

Thatcher's political and economic philosophy emphasised reduced state intervention as well as free markets and "entrepreneurialism". She vowed to end excessive government interference in the economy and attempted to do this through privatizing nationally owned enterprises. After the James Callaghan government had concluded that the Keynesian approach to demand-side management failed, Thatcher felt that the economy was not self-righting and that new fiscal judgements had to be made to concentrate on inflation. She began her economic reforms by increasing interest rates to slow the growth of the money supply and thus lower inflation. In accordance with her "less government intervention" views she introduced public spending cuts particularly on housing and industry subsidies. She also placed limits on the printing of money and legal restrictions on trade unions.

By January 1982 the inflation rate had fallen to 8.6% from earlier peaks of 18%. By 1983 overall economic growth was stronger, while inflation and mortgage rates were at their lowest levels since 1970. The term "Thatcherism" came to refer to her policies as well as aspects of her ethical outlook and personal style, including moral absolutism, nationalism, focus on individuals rather than society as a whole and an uncompromising approach to achieving political goals.

After the 1983 election, the Conservative majority expanded, Thatcher continued to enact her economic policies. The UK government sold most of the state's large utilities. The policy of privatisation was a main component of Thatcherism. When Thatcher was forced to resign as British Prime Minister in 1990 British economic growth was on average higher than the other large EU economies (Germany, France and Italy).

The price of these economic policies was a temporary and dramatic increase in unemployment that embarrassed the Thatcher government so much that the definition of unemployment was changed 31 times in order to come up with lower figures. The official rate of unemployment in the United Kingdom increased to 9.1% in the years 1979–89 after it had been 3.4% between 1973 and 1979 and 1.9% between 1960 and 1973.

In 2001 Peter Mandelson, a Member of Parliament belonging to the British Labour Party and closely associated with Tony Blair, declared that "we are all Thatcherites now." In reference to contemporary British political culture it could be said that a "post-Thatcherite consensus" exists with regard to economic policy. In the 1980s the now defunct Social Democratic Party adhered to a "tough and tender" approach in which Thatcherite reforms were coupled with extra welfare provision. Neil Kinnock, leader of the Labour Party from 1983 to 1992, initiated Labour's rightward shift across the political spectrum by concurring largely with the economic policies of the Thatcher governments. The New Labour government of Tony Blair has been described as "neo-Thatcherite" by some since many of their economic policies mimicked those of Thatcher.

The coalition government of Cameron and Clegg, that came into office in 2010 has been described as Neoliberal, with neoliberal "Orange Book" Liberal Democrats playing key ministerial roles.

=== United States ===
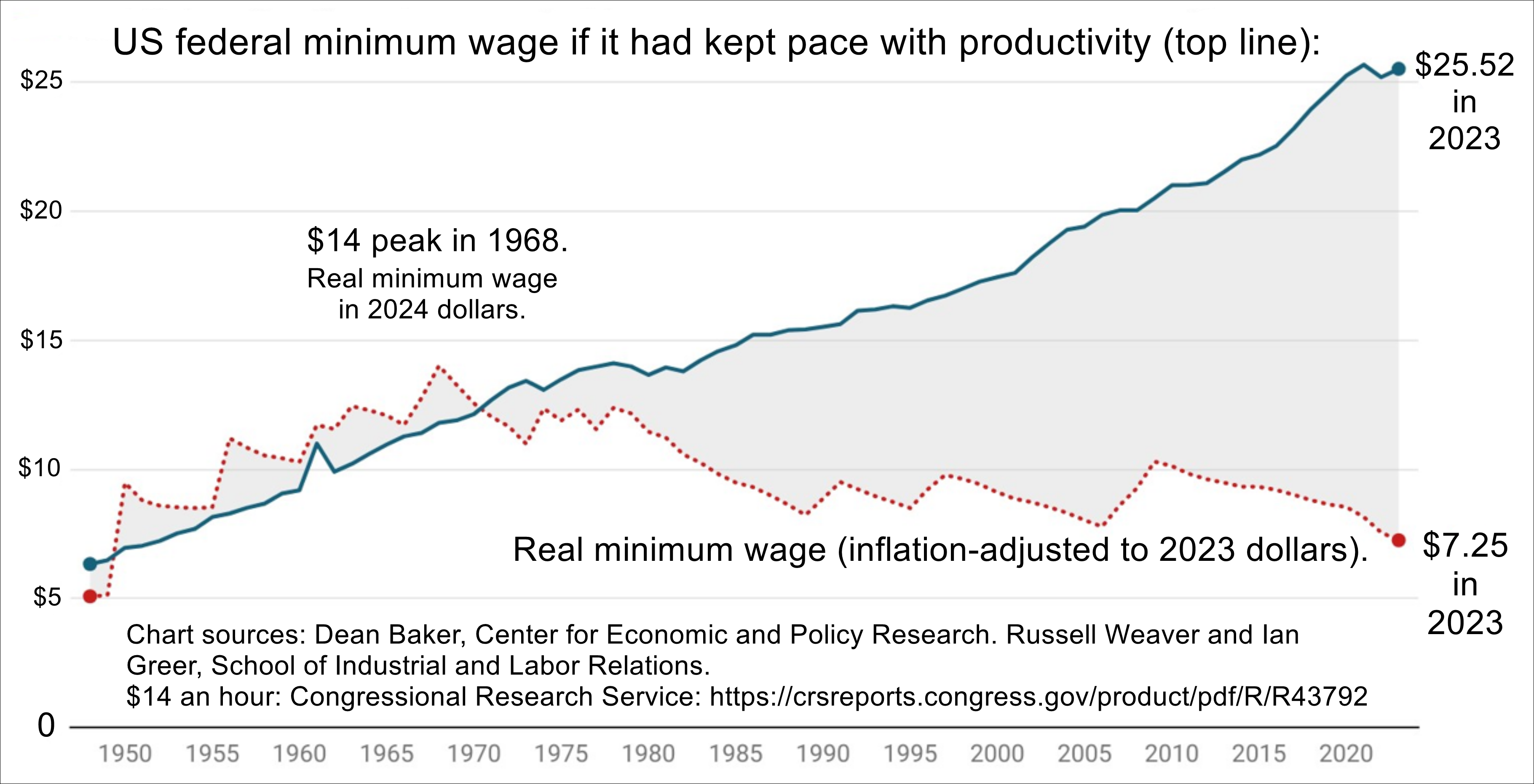
US federal minimum wage if it had kept pace with productivity. Also, the real minimum wage.

The Administration of Ronald Reagan, from 1981 to 1989, made a range of decisions that served to liberalize (in contemporary US terminology, this is more likely to be described as conservative economics rather than liberal; in the sense of this article, liberalize refers to an economic system involving few regulations) the American economy. These policies are often described as Reaganomics, and are often associated with supply-side economics (the notion that, in order to lower prices and cultivate economic prosperity, policies should appeal to producers rather than consumers).

During Reagan's tenure, GDP grew at an annual rate of 2.7% per year. Per capita GDP in real terms was $31,877 in 1989 a rise of 24% from the $25,640 in 1981. Unemployment dropped from its high in the 1983 recession but it averaged higher than the previous decade and the subsequent decade. Also, inflation significantly decreased. Average real wages were stagnant, however, as inequality began to grow for the first time since the 1920s. Some, like William Niskanen, would point out two facts in response, the first being that average compensation for workers (that is wages + fringe benefits) went up through the 1980s, and that every quintile of society performed better during the 1980s. The policies were derided by some as "Trickle-down economics", due to the significant cuts in the upper tax brackets. There was a massive increase in Cold War related defense spending that caused large budget deficits, the U.S. trade deficit expansion, and contributed to the Savings and Loan crisis, In order to cover new federal budget deficits, the United States borrowed heavily both domestically and abroad, raising the national debt from $700 billion to $3 trillion, and the United States moved from being the world's largest international creditor to the world's largest debtor nation.

Peter Gowan has argued that the United States has been the main force behind the adoption of neoliberal policies in the rest of the world. The basic argument is that since the dollar is the international reserve currency, American banks are at a competitive advantage with respect to non-American banks, which cannot directly lend in dollars, so that their operations involve more foreign exchange risk. (Since the dollar is the international exchange currency, most international reserves are held as dollars, and the price of commodities such as oil are set in dollars, it is in general less risky to hold dollars than to hold other currencies, in the short term, at least.) Thus, once the United States liberalized its financial markets and controls over its banking industry, other countries were forced to follow suit.
