= René Philoctète =

René Philoctète (16 November 1932 – 17 July 1995) was a Haitian poet. Born in Jérémie, some of his most notable poems are Saison des hommes (1960), which was also his first published poem, Les Tambours du Soleil (1962), and Ces Iles qui Marchent (1969).

His novel Massacre River about the Parsley massacre was translated into English by Linda Coverdale and published by New Directions in 2005. It is noted for its lucid metaphors and experimental prose and features a preface by Edwidge Danticat and an introduction by Lyonel Trouillot.
