= Michel-Rolph Trouillot =

Haitian American academic and anthropologist

- Born: Port-au-Prince, Haiti
- Died: Chicago, Illinois, U.S.
- Occupations: Professor of anthropology and of social sciences

Academic background
- Education: Brooklyn College (B.A.)
- Alma mater: Johns Hopkins University (PhD)

Academic work
- Institutions: University of Chicago, Johns Hopkins University
- Main interests: Caribbean history
- Notable works: Open the Social Science (1990); Silencing the Past: Power and the Production of History (1995); Global Transformations (2003)

Michel-Rolph Trouillot (French: [miʃɛl ʁɔlf tʁujo]; November 26, 1949 – July 5, 2012) was a Haitian American academic and anthropologist. He was a Professor of Anthropology and of Social Sciences at the University of Chicago. He was best known for his books Open the Social Science (1990), Silencing the Past: Power and the Production of History (1995), and Global Transformations (2003), which explored the origins and application of social science in academia and its implications in the world. Trouillot has been one of the most influential thinkers of the Afro-Caribbean diaspora, because he developed wide-ranging academic work centered on Caribbean issues. Alyssa Goldstein Sepinwall mentioned that "Trouillot was one of the most original and thoughtful voices in academia. His writings influenced scholars worldwide in many fields, from anthropology to history to Caribbean studies".

== Biography ==
=== Early life ===
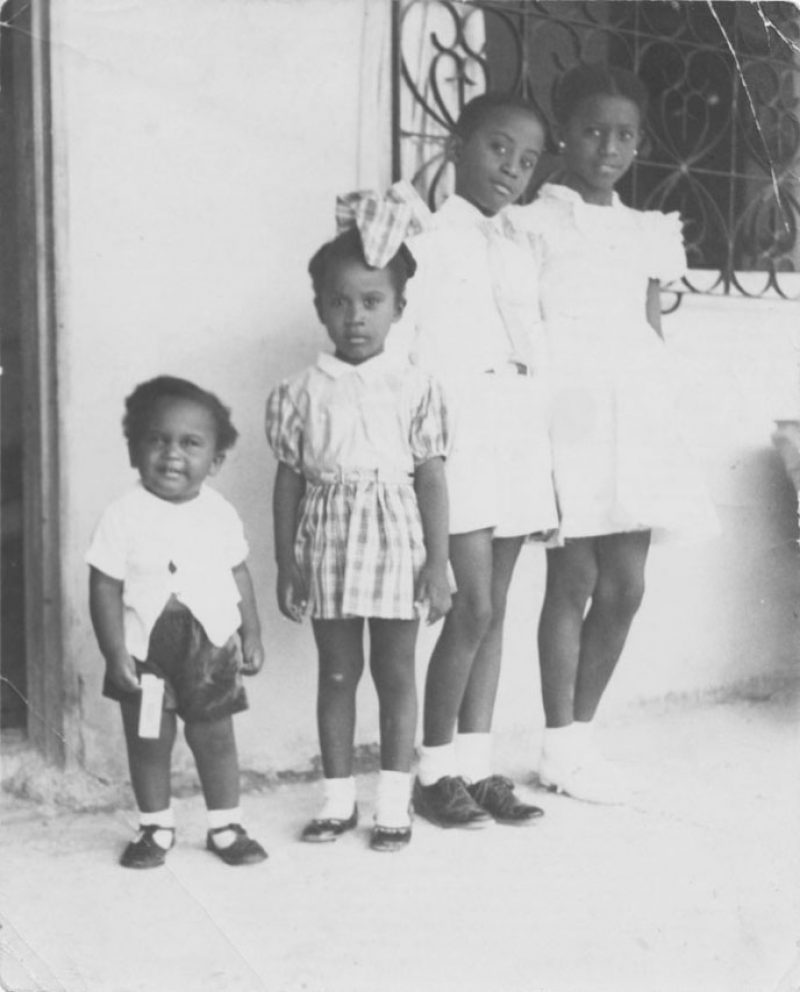
Left-to-right: Lyonel, Évelyne, Michel-Rolph, and Jocelyne Trouillot in front of their home in Port-au-Prince, Haiti.

Trouillot was born on November 26, 1949, in Port-au-Prince, Haiti. His family included intellectuals, academics, and at least one judge. His father, Ernst Trouillot, a lawyer and professor at a prestigious lycee, hosted a television show about Haitian history as part of his academic contributions. His uncle, Henock Trouillot, was the director of the National Archives of Haiti, besides being a prolific writer and public historian. His family was also politically inclined; Trouillot's stepmother, Ertha Pascal-Trouillot, a well-known lawyer and judge, was named interim president in 1990 as the country stabilized and prepared for the democratic elections. His brother Lyonel Trouillot and sisters Évelyne Trouillot and Jocelyne Trouillot are all also academics and writers.

Trouillot's life was marked by the personal experience of immigration and exile. Before beginning scholarly study, he was a songwriter and activist involved in political protest against the Duvalier dynasty in Haiti and against the American government's treatment of undocumented Haitian immigrants. In 1968, Trouillot left Haiti as part of the large wave of student activists fleeing the repression of Duvalier dictatorship.

In 1971, Trouillot found refuge with his impoverished aunt in Brooklyn, New York City. His family lived in a basement and slept on the floor. This is where Trouillot started rehearsals for a Haitian exile theater company, Tanbou Libète (Drum of Freedom). He was convinced that theater could be used to instigate social change and alter the course of politics. In 1978, he joined his aunt in Park Slope, Brooklyn, and completed a bachelor's degree in Caribbean history and culture at Brooklyn College, while working as a taxi driver and participating in the political and cultural activism of the Haitian diaspora. In 1978, Trouillot left Brooklyn to enroll in the anthropology program at Johns Hopkins University, where he completed his PhD, and began his career as an anthropologist.

=== Academic life ===
Trouillot joined the University of Chicago faculty in 1998 after serving as the Krieger/Eisenhower Distinguished Professor of Anthropology and director of the Institute for Global Studies in Culture, Power and History at Johns Hopkins University. He was one of the most original, disciplinary, innovative and thoughtful voices in academia because his theoretical frameworks expanded to social science knowledge in Caribbean studies. His writings also influenced scholars in many fields—from anthropology, sociology, to history to Caribbean studies. Trouillot's academic legacy explores sub-fields of anthropology with regards to knowledge in social sciences. As he explains in Global Transformations (2003), he viewed academic work as more than a simple search for facts: "What I want to know in this case is never merely an empirical fact, let alone what I could learn from someone else—from a book, for instance. It is the knowledge that I want to produce. It is what I want to say about this topic, this site, these people—the 'burning questions' I want to share even with myself as interlocutor."

=== Death ===
In the last days of his academic life, he had retired due to chronic illness. Trouillot died in his home in Chicago on July 5, 2012, after a decade-long struggle to recover from a brain aneurysm. He was 62 years old. It was said in the documentary Exterminate All the Brutes that a faulty pacemaker was installed into Trouillot's heart, which ultimately was discovered too late. As a result, Trouillot died in his sleep.

== Publications ==
Trouillot was the author and co-author of a number of books. As an activist and undergraduate, he published the first nonfiction book in Haitian Creole in 1977, Ti difé boulé sou istwa Ayiti (A Small Fire Burning on Haitian History), which sheds knowledge and offers new interpretations of Haitian history. The book has since been translated into English as Stirring the Pot of Haitian History. His dissertation, which later became his second book, Peasants and Capital: Dominica in the World Economy (1988), focused on how peasants in Dominica dealt with the transformations of the global banana industry. He published Les racines historiques de l’état duvaliérien, which later appeared in English as Haiti: State Against Nation. The Origins and Legacies of Duvalierism (1990), which was an important book about the repression and roots of the 1957 to 1986 Duvalier dictatorship. Additionally, Trouillot published Silencing the Past: Power and the Production of History (1995), which has become a foundational text for both Haitian studies and history. He was also part of a distinguished international group of scholars that published Open the Social Sciences (1996), which traces the history of the social sciences, describes the recent debates surrounding them, and discusses in what ways they can be intelligently restructured. Finally, Global Transformations: Anthropology and the Modern World (2003), examines anthropology's historical underpinnings—its epistemic groundings and political consequences.

== Honors ==
The Caribbean Philosophical Association awarded him the 2011 Frantz Fanon Lifetime Achievement Award; for "the originality of his interrogations in the human sciences, especially anthropology and history. He was also recognized for his articulation of the importance and challenges of Haiti in contemporary discussions of freedom and reclamations of the past".

== Selected works ==
- 1977 Ti difé boulé sou Istoua Ayiti. New York: Koléksion Lakansièl.
- 1988 Peasants and Capital: Dominica in the World Economy. Johns Hopkins University Press.
- 1990 Haiti: State against Nation. The Origins and Legacy of Duvalierism. Monthly Review Press.
- 1995 Silencing the Past: Power and the Production of History. Beacon Press.
- 2003 Global Transformations: Anthropology and the Modern World. Palgrave.
