= Romuald Fonkoua =

Cameroonian writer

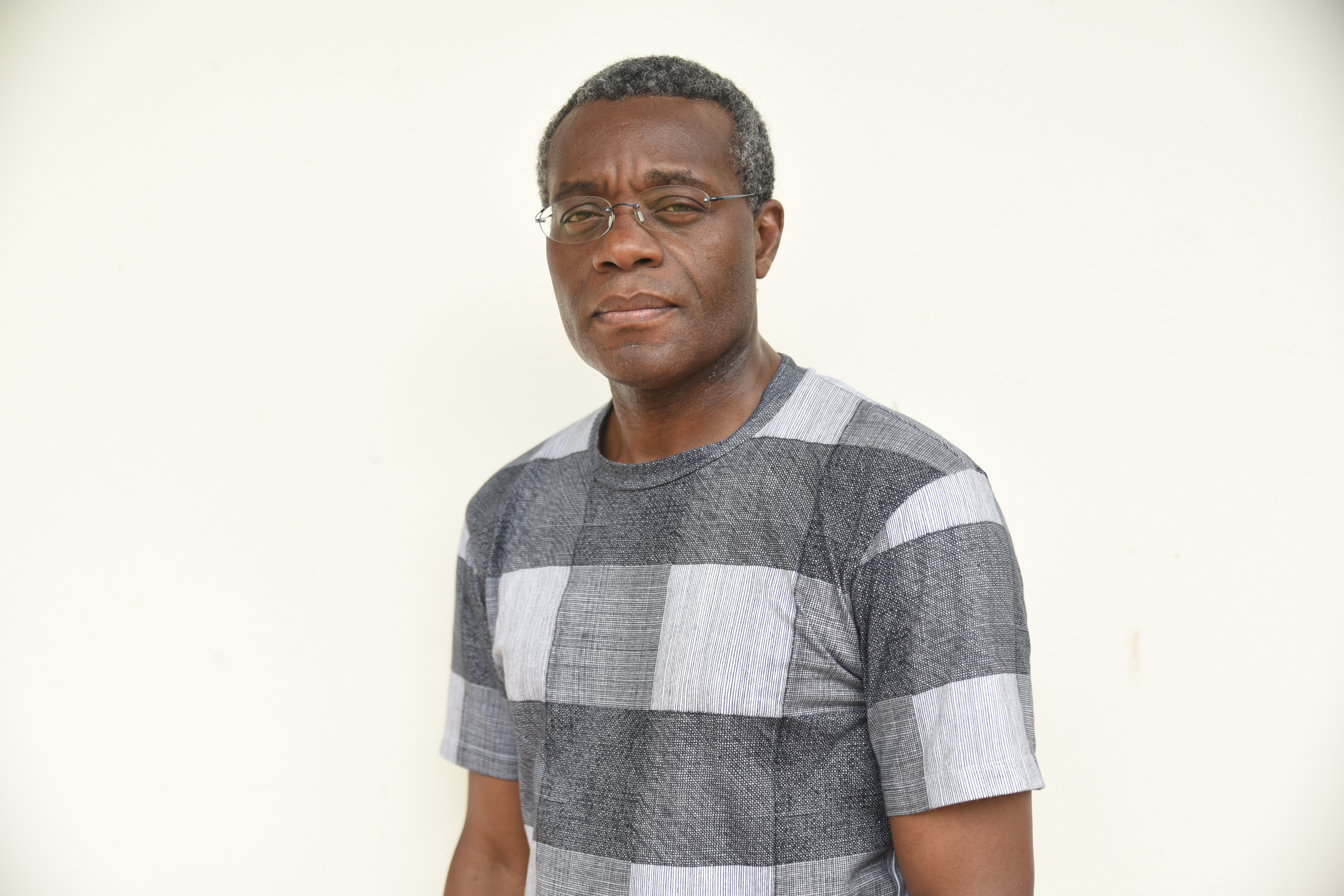
- Born: November 26, 1961 (age 64)
- Education: University of Lille
- Occupations: Professor, Biographer
- Writing career
- Language: French
- Notable awards: Prix Carbet de la Caraïbe et du Tout-Monde

Romuald Fonkoua (born 1961 in Cameroon) is a professor of Francophone literature at the Faculty of Letters of Sorbonne University where he directs the International Center for Francophone Studies.

== Biography ==
Romuald Fonkoua studied literature in Cameroon and France, earning a doctorate in general and comparative literature from the University of Lille. Fonkoua lectured at University of Cergy-Pontoise before becoming a professor of Francophone literature at the University of Strasbourg. Since 2000, he has been a teaching fellow at Middlebury College. Fonkoua directs the "Lettres francophone" collection of the Sorbonne University Presses (SUP) and co-directs the "Bibliothèque francophone" collection at Classiques Garnier.

He has been editor-in-chief of Presence Africaine since 1999.

Fonkoua's work focuses on questions of general Francophone literature, its history, sociology, and biographies of writers.

== Works ==
- 1998 Romuald Fonkoua. Les discours de voyages, Afrique - Antilles, Paris, Karthala, coll. "Lettres du Sud".
- 2001 Romuald Fonkoua and Pierre Halan. Les Champs littéraires africains, Paris, Karthala.
- 2002 Romuald Fonkoua. Essai sur une mesure du monde au xx^{e} siècle : Édouard Glissant, Paris, Honoré Champion.
- 2003 Romuald Fonkoua, Bernard Mourails and Anne Piriou. Robert Delavignette savant et politique : 1897-1976, Paris, Karthala.
- 2010 Romuald Fonkoua. Aimé Césaire, 1913-2008, Paris, Perrin.
- 2012 Romuald Fonkoua, Eléonore Reverzy and Pierre Hartmann. Les Fables du Politique des Lumières à nos jours, Strasbourg, Strasbourg University Press.
- 2018 Romuald Fonkoua and Muriel Ott. 'Les héros et la mort dans les traditions épiques, Paris, Karthala.
