= Mimi Barthélémy =

Haitian writer

Mimi Barthélémy, the nom de plume of Michèle Armand (May 3, 1939 – April 27, 2013), was a Haitian writer, actor, storyteller and director.

== Life ==
She was born in Port-au-Prince and was educated in Haiti and continued her studies at the Institute of Political Studies, at Paris X (Masters in Spanish literature) and at Paris VIII (Doctorate in Theatre and Cinematography Studies) in France. Barthélémy has also lived in Latin America, Sri Lanka and North Africa.

In 1987, she was the host for a series of well-known storytellers at "Le Petit Contoire" in Paris.

In 1989, she received the Becker d’Or from the 3rd Festival d’Acteurs d’Evry for La reine des poissons. In 1992, Barthélémy was awarded the Prix Arletty de l'universalité de la langue française for La Dernière lettre de l'amiral. In 2000, she was named a Chevalier in the French National Order of Merit and, in 2001, an Officier in the Ordre des Arts et des Lettres. In 2011, she was named a Chevalier in the French Legion of Honour.

Barthélémy died in Paris of a heart attack at the age of 73.

== Selected works ==
=== Stories ===
- Haïti, la perle nue (1999)
- La création de l’île de la Tortue (2005)
- Contes d’Haïti (2011)

=== Theatre ===
- L'autre rive lointaine Honduras (1981)
- Sebastian goes shopping Santa Cruz, California (1983)
- Madea Paris (1985)
- La Cocarde d'Ebène Montpellier (1989)
- Soldats-marrons Ris-Orangis (1989)
- Une Très belle mort Avignon (2000)

=== Recordings ===
- La Reine des poissons (2010)
- Contes d’Haïti
- Dis-moi des Chansons d’Haïti (2007)
- Vieux Caïman – Contes de grandes îles de la mer Caraïbe (2001)
- Tendez chanter l’amour (1999)
- Chantez dansez Haïti Guadeloupe (1996)
- Chansons et comptines d’Haïti (1992)
- L’Oranger magique, contes d’Haïti (1992)
- Légendes du monde entier (1992)
