= Jocelyne Trouillot =

Haitian writer and educator (born 1948)

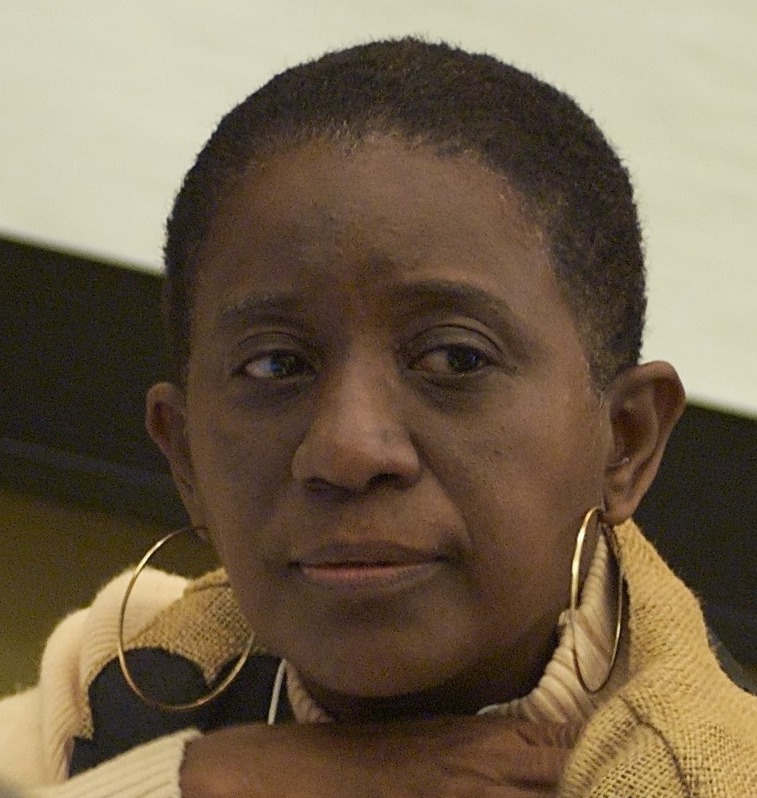
- Born: April 21, 1948 (age 78); Port-au-Prince, Haiti
- Education: Florida Atlantic University (Ph.D.), Long Island University (M.A.)
- Relatives: Michel-Rolph Trouillot (brother), Lyonel Trouillot (brother), Évelyne Trouillot (sister), Henock Trouillot (uncle)

Marie-Jocelyne Trouillot (French: [ʒɔslin tʁujo]; born April 21, 1948) is a Haitian writer and educator.

== Early life ==
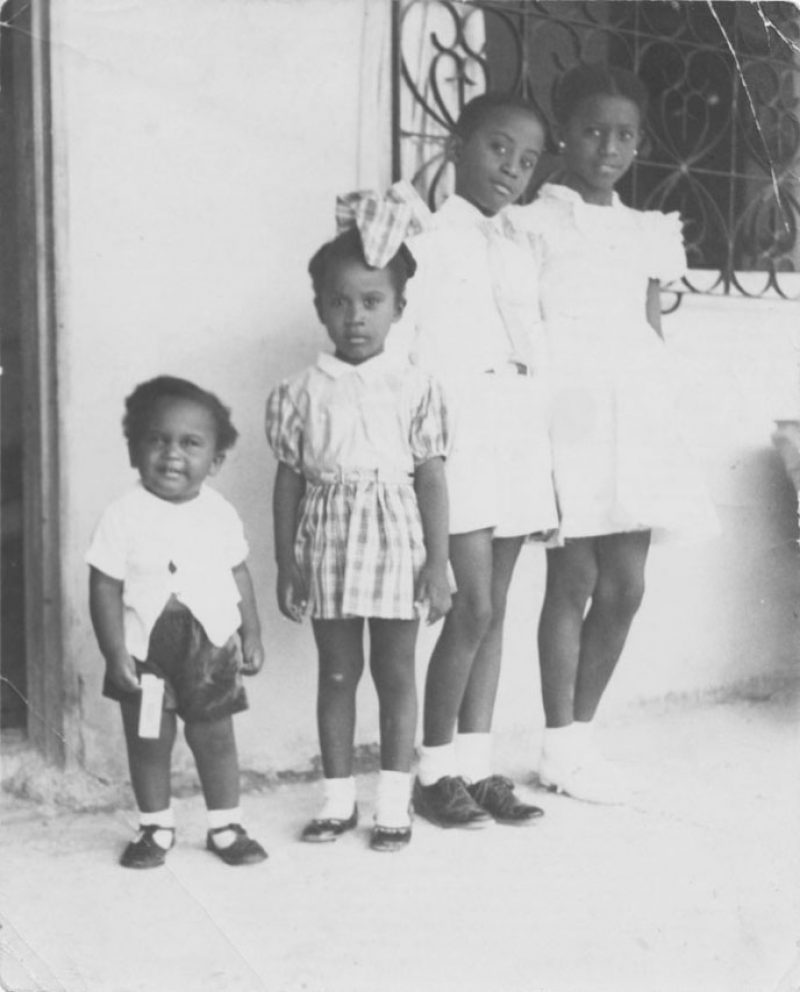
Left-to-right: Lyonel, Évelyne, Michel-Rolph, and Jocelyne Trouillot in front of their home in Port-au-Prince, Haiti.

Marie-Jocelyne Trouillot was born in Port-au-Prince, April 21, 1948. She is the daughter of Ernst Trouillot and Anne Marie Morisset. Her siblings are the writers Lyonel Trouillot and Évelyne Trouillot and the historian Michel-Rolph Trouillot, and her uncle is the historian Henock Trouillot.

== Career ==
Trouillot graduated from the École normale supérieure in Haiti and then went on to study psychology and education at Université de Bordeaux. She received a master's degree in bilingual education from Long Island University. Trouillot taught for several years, also developing educational materials for Haitian children. After moving to Florida, she completed a doctoral degree at Florida Atlantic University. For a number of years, she directed bilingual education for schools in Dade County. After the Duvalier regime in Haiti ended, she returned to Haiti, where she was a co-founder of the Université Caraïbe. Trouillot also was founder and president of AYIBBY, the Haitian branch of the International Board on Books for Young People. She promotes the use of Haitian Creole in schools.

Trouillot is the author of a number of textbooks, as well as children's books in Creole. She is also rector for the Université Caraïbe and director of the Université Caraïbe publishing house.

== Selected works ==
- Betsi (2007)
- Yo bay kanè (2008)
- Pòpòl nèg Chanzòl (2009)
- Goudougoudou (2010)
- 126 lèt damou (2011)
