= The French Art of War =

2011 novel by Alexis Jenni

- First edition cover
- Author: Alexis Jenni
- Original title: L'Art français de la guerre
- Translator: Frank Wynne
- Language: French
- Publisher: Éditions Gallimard
- Publication date: 18 August 2011
- Publication place: France
- English publication date: March 2017
- Pages: 633
- ISBN: 978-2-07-013458-8

The French Art of War (French: L'Art français de la guerre) is a 2011 novel by the French writer Alexis Jenni, published by Éditions Gallimard. It is an adventure story about the military history of France in Indochina and Algeria. It received the Prix Goncourt, with five votes to three against Carole Martinez's Du domaine des Murmures.

It was published in English by Atlantic Books as The French Art of War (translated by Frank Wynne).

== Background ==
L'Art français de la guerre was the third novel written by Alexis Jenni, a high-school biology teacher, although the first published. He had previously written one which he never submitted to a publisher, and one which was not accepted. According to Jenni, L'Art français de la guerre took five years to write. He considers himself a "Sunday writer, just as there are Sunday painters."

The novel was partly inspired by the debate on French national identity, announced by President Nicolas Sarkozy’s government. Jenni wanted readers to think about the issue of national identity, a social debate occurring in France at the time the book was written, without having to take an opinion or side.

== Publication ==
The novel was published in France on 18 August 2011 through Éditions Gallimard. Before it won the Prix Goncourt it had sold more than 56,000 copies; novels that win the Goncourt will sell on average over 400,000 copies.

== Reception ==
Goncourt judge Tahar Ben Jelloun said of the novel "It’s important to exorcise the unpleasant parts of history through literature, and not through political discourse, which doesn’t help at all. Thanks to fiction, we can probe deep into these problems and touch people’s consciences and hearts." Journalist Jean Birnbaum (b. 1974) echoed that sentiment, praising the book for verbalizing the subconscious feelings of his generation; until Jenni's novel was published there was no literature to help process the country's recent military past on his generation's own terms, the novel made honest debate possible.

== See also ==
- 2011 in literature
- Contemporary French literature
