= Évelyne Trouillot =

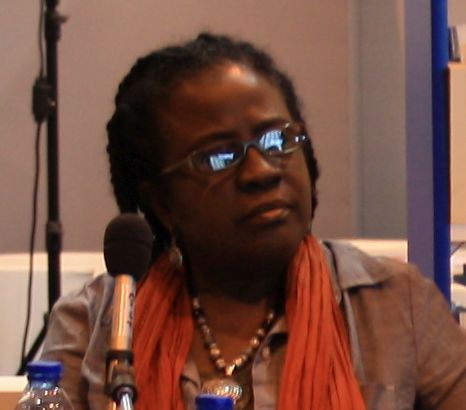
- Born: January 2, 1954 (age 72); Port-au-Prince, Haiti
- Occupation: French professor at Université d'Etat d'Haïti
- Children: 2
- Relatives: Michel-Rolph Trouillot (brother), Lyonel Trouillot (brother), Jocelyne Trouillot (sister), Henock Trouillot (uncle)
- Writing career
- Language: French, English, Creole

Évelyne Trouillot (French: [evlin tʁujo]; born January 2, 1954) is a Haitian author, writing in French and Creole.

== Early life ==
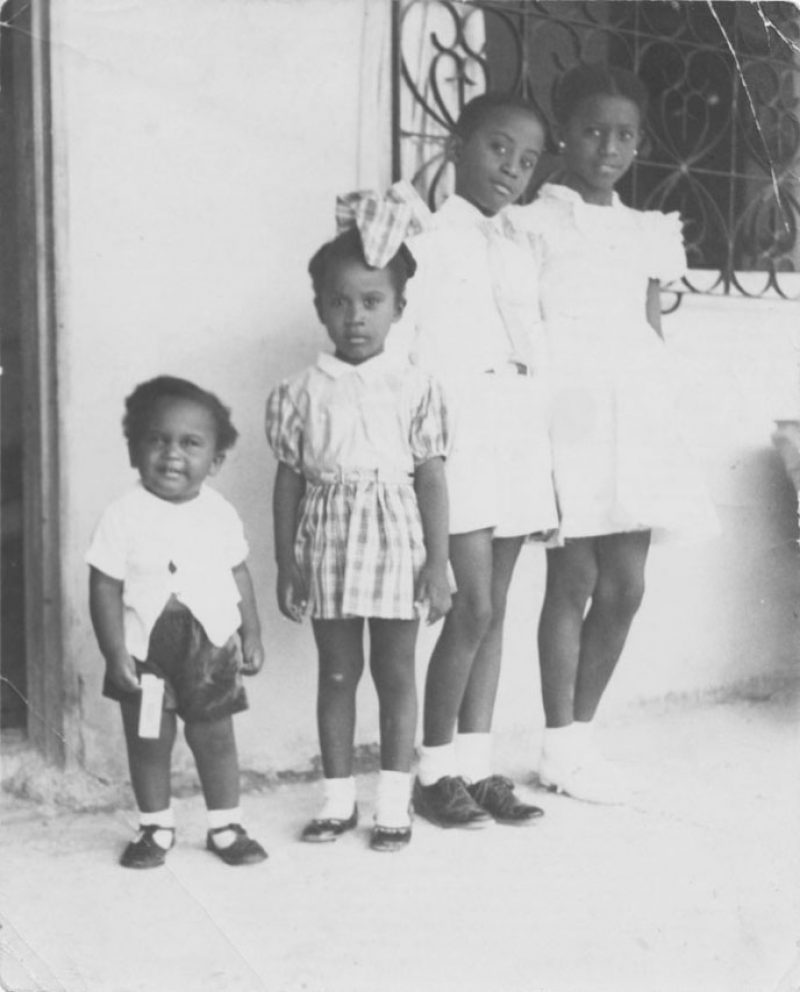
Left-to-right: Lyonel, Évelyne, Michel-Rolph, and Jocelyne Trouillot in front of their home in Port-au-Prince, Haiti.

Évelyne Trouillot was born in Port-au-Prince, Haiti, January 2, 1954. She was the daughter of Ernst Trouillot and Anne-Marie Morisset. Her brother Lyonel is also a writer; her sister Jocelyne is a writer and academic. Her brother Michel-Rolph was an anthropologist and academic. The Haitian historian Henock Trouillot was her uncle.

== Career ==
After completing secondary school, she left for the United States, where she studied languages and education at the university level.

In 1987, Trouillot returned to Haiti, where she teaches French at the State University. In 2002, Évelyne, her daughter Nadève Ménard, and her brother Lyonel, founded Pré-Texte, a writer's organization that sponsors reading and writing workshops.

Her work has been translated into German, English, Spanish, and Italian and has been published in magazines in Cuba, France, Mexico, and Canada.

Tracy Denean Sharpley-Whiting called Rosalie l’infâme "A wonderful contribution to the corpus of Francophone women writers in the Caribbean".

== Awards and honours ==
In 2012, Trouillot received the Canute A. Brodhurst Prize for short fiction from the magazine The Caribbean Writer.

Her novel Désirée Congo, translated by M. A. Salvodon, was shortlisted for the 2025 Warwick Prize for Women in Translation.

== Selected works ==
- La chambre interdite, short story collection (1996)
- Sans parapluie de retour, poetry (2001)
- Parlez-moi d’amour, stories (2002)
- Rosalie l’infâme, novel (2003), received the Prix de la romancière francophone awarded by the Soroptimist Club of Grenoble, published in English as The Infamous Rosalie (2013)
- L'ile De Ti Jean, children's book (2003)
- Plidetwal, poetry (2005), in Creole
- Le Bleu de l’île, play (2005), received the Prix Beaumarchais from the Ecritures Théâtrale Contemporaines en Caraïbe
- Le Mirador aux étoiles, novel (2007)
- La mémoire aux abois, novel (2010), received the Prix Carbet de la Caraïbe et du Tout-Monde, translated into English as Memory at Bay (2015)
- La fille à la guitare / Yon fi, yon gita, yon vwa, children's literature (2012), in French and Creole
- Absences sans frontières, novel (2013)
- "Par la fissure de mes mots", poetry (2014)
- Le Rond Point, novel (2015), received the Prix Barbancourt
- Je m'appelle Fridhomme, short stories, C3Editions, 2017
- Désirée Congo, novel (2020), French Edition, September 24, 2020
- Les Jumelles de la rue Nicolas, édition Project îles. (2022)
