= Ministry of Education and Science of Tajikistan =

Government ministry of Tajikistan

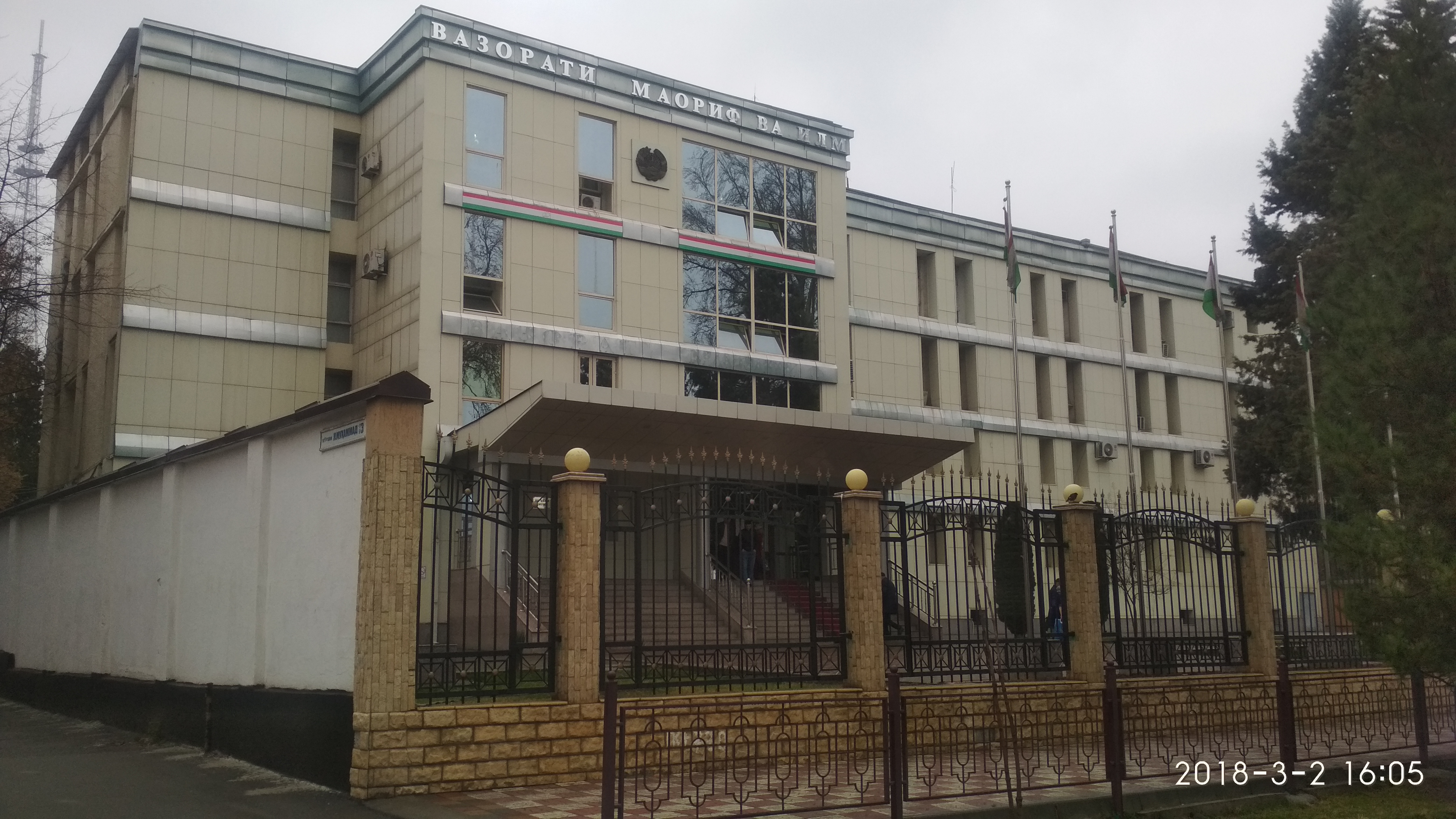
- Ministry building (2018).

Ministry overview
- Formed: 14 December 1924 (101 years ago) (as the People's Commissariat of Education of the Tajik SSR)
- Type: Education and science
- Jurisdiction: Government of Tajikistan
- Headquarters: Dushanbe, Tajikistan
- Minister responsible: Rahimjon Saidzoda
- Website: maorif.tj

The Ministry of Education and Science of the Republic of Tajikistan (Tajik: Вазорати маориф ва илми Ҷумҳурии Тоҷикистон) is the central executive body of the Government of Tajikistan, responsible for the development and implementation of state policy and regulation of legal norms in the field of education.

== History ==
On 14 December 1924, the People's Commissariat of Education of the Tajik SSR was established and began its work on 11 February 1925, in Dushanbe. The People's Commissariat of Public Education was later renamed the Ministry of Public Education of the Tajik SSR (1946–78: 1988–92) and the Ministry of Higher and Secondary Specialized Education of the Tajik SSR (1978–88).

In 1992, it was renamed the Ministry of Education of Tajikistan. On 29 November 2013, the Ministry of Education of Tajikistan was transformed into the Ministry of Education and Science of the Republic of Tajikistan and it was established that the tasks of scientific policy were transferred from the Tajik Academy of Sciences to this ministry.

== List of ministers ==
- Abbas Aliyev (1924–1927)
- Yusufziyo Nisormuhammadov (1927–1929)
- Mukhammedzhan Masaidov (1929–1930)
- Yusufziyo Nisormuhammadov (1930–1932)
- Said Nasyrov (1932–1934)
- K. Abdinov (1934–1936)
- S. Gasanov (1936–1937)
- Mukhamedamir Niyazov (1937–1938)
- Tai Pulatov (1938–1942)
- Khotam Solekhboev (1942–1943)
- Khashim Sodikov (1943–1947)
- Khabibullo Nematulloev (1947–1954)
- Tai Pulatov (1954–1962)
- Mohamed Asimi (1962–1963)
- Rustambek Yusufbekov (1963–1974)
- Rauf Dodoboev (1974–1986)
- Khushkadam Davlatkadamov (1978–1984)
- Abdulbashir Rashidov (1986–1988)
- Talbak Nazarov (1988–1989)
- Ismoil Davlatov (1990–1992)
- Zokir Vazirov (1992)
- Bozgul Dodkhudoeva (1992–1994)
- Munira Inoyatova (1994–2000)
- Safarali Radjabov (2000—2005)
- Abdujabbor Rahmonzoda (2005–2012)
- Nuriddin Saidov (2012—2020)
- Muhammadyusuf Imomzoda (2020–2022)
- Rahimjon Saidzoda (since 2022)

== See also ==
- Education in Tajikistan
- Science and technology in Tajikistan

== Links ==
- maorif.tj – official website of the Ministry of Education and Science
