= Henock Trouillot =

Haitian historian, playwright, and novelist

Henock Trouillot (French: [ɛnɔk tʁujo]; January 19, 1923 – September 13, 1988) was a Haitian historian, playwright, and novelist. He wrote historical and sociological books, such as:

- Historiographie d'Haïti (1954)
- La Condition des Nègres Domestiques à Saint-Domingue (1955)
- Economie et Finances de Saint-Domingue (1965)
- La Vengeance du Mapou (1967)
- Le Gouvernement du Roi Henri Christophe (1974)

He was the uncle of anthropologist and historical theorist Michel-Rolph Trouillot, and writers Lyonel Trouillot, Évelyne Trouillot, and Jocelyne Trouillot.
