= Effects of economic liberalisation on education in Tajikistan =

Tajikistan gained independence in 1991 after the collapse of the Soviet Union, and began its transition from socialist economics to a more liberal, market economy. Initially, efforts to effectively liberalise education to reflect the new economic order were hampered by the civil war that raged between 1991 and 1997, and the resulting economic collapse. Tajikistan has since received aid from the International Monetary Fund (IMF), the World Bank (WB), and the Asian Development Bank (ADB), adopting a number of educational reforms with mixed results.

== Post-independence ==
In the decade following independence, Tajikistan's market institutions, economic structures, tax system, and levels of incomes and savings were not adequate for the new market economy (OECD, 2004). This meant that education was “underfunded, inequitable, ineffective, and riddled with continuing tensions”. The erosion of real wages for teachers as a result of civil strife and economic downturn led to a brain-drain of qualified personnel working in public service, and many turned to religious educational institutions instead. However, throughout the 1990s, foreign aid from bilateral donors and development banks flooded into the newly independent Central Asian nations. By the turn of the century, “all segments of the donor community were represented, their agendas set, and contours of educational development clearly discernable”.

== Reform ==
In 1998, the Tajik government accepted a three-year financial agreement with the IMF's Enhanced Structural Adjustment Facility (ESAF) and the WB's Structural Adjustment Credit (SAC). This involved adopting a government restructuring program to respond to increased economic liberalisation and improve public services. By 2004, Tajikistan was developing market infrastructure, appropriate legal institutions and economic management. Because of common Soviet history, Central Asian states shared most of their education policies at independence. Consequently, the post-socialist education reform packages employed by the WB, ADB and other UN organisations in these countries was very similar. The features most directly affected by the new liberal economic strategy were the “decentralization of educational finance and governance”, the “privatization of higher education”, the “reorganization (or “rationalization”) of schools" and the “liberalization of textbook publishing”, although many other facets of education were also indirectly affected. In 2013, a joint statement was released by the Tajik representative office of the World Bank and the International Finance Corporation (IFC), claiming that the World Bank would support Tajikistan's second-generation reforms in education and emphasising the importance of the private sector in driving development, and the need to further improve the investment climate.

== Ideological basis ==
The economic liberalisation pursued by the WB and IMF resulted in education reform policies emphasising the development of a knowledge economy. It was thought that education should be seen as providing human capital, which underpins this economy. The “benefits of direct business involvement in state schooling”, was advocated too, “both in the interests of emerging private sector edubusiness, and in conforming schooling to business agenda.”

== Benefits ==
GDP had plummeted in excess of 60% by 1997, after the civil war. One of every five schools in Tajikistan was destroyed and the conflict cost around $7 billion. Furthermore, because of Tajikistan's economic frailty and the loss of Soviet funding, imports and export markets, the Republic desperately needed capital. Economic liberalisation meant that there was an influx of NGOs and international donor money, including roughly $900 million from the WB in grants and loans since 1996. With donor money, issues in education such as infrastructure, education quality and lack of resources are being addressed. Over the past 15 years, Tajikistan has exhibited growth in its new market economy and begun to drag people out of poverty. As it does so, it becomes more suited to the post-socialist educational model as more people have become able to afford the costs of education. There has also been a reduction of other prohibitive factors such as poor health or poor nutrition that stop people attending school.

== Drawbacks ==
Money brought into Tajikistan's education sector by external agencies afforded these agencies influence, and this has often brought them into discord with local authorities and educators. This is highlighted in the selection and production of textbooks. Further, education policies adopted in Central Asia that are part of the “Western reform agenda” have often been “hijacked” by policy-makers and “used for their own purposes nationally”. International organisations have often failed to involve local Tajik education stakeholders in education policy development, claiming that local policymakers lack the skills to make good policy. Because Tajikistan lacks the institutions (e.g. legal and social) necessary to ensure successful relationships between government, NGOs and international donors, the efficiency and effectiveness of NGO-led education programmes is limited. Bahry highlights the need for effective dialogue between local authorities, external donors and important stakeholders. During the Soviet era, education and the “necessities of schooling” (e.g. textbooks, travel) were provided free of charge in Tajikistan. Since independence, and the privatisation of many educational institutions, enrollment and attainment rates have suffered significantly. Many have claimed that the informal costs of education are too high, even in subsidised education, with parents often asked for donations to prop up teacher salaries and maintenance budgets. Some claim that the new democratic society has allowed more people to opt out of sending their kids to school. This has disadvantaged less privileged youngsters. In the Post-Soviet era, the attainment rate gap has widened between men and women, and between those living rurally and in urban settings.
