= Alexis Jenni =

French novelist and biology teacher (born 1963)

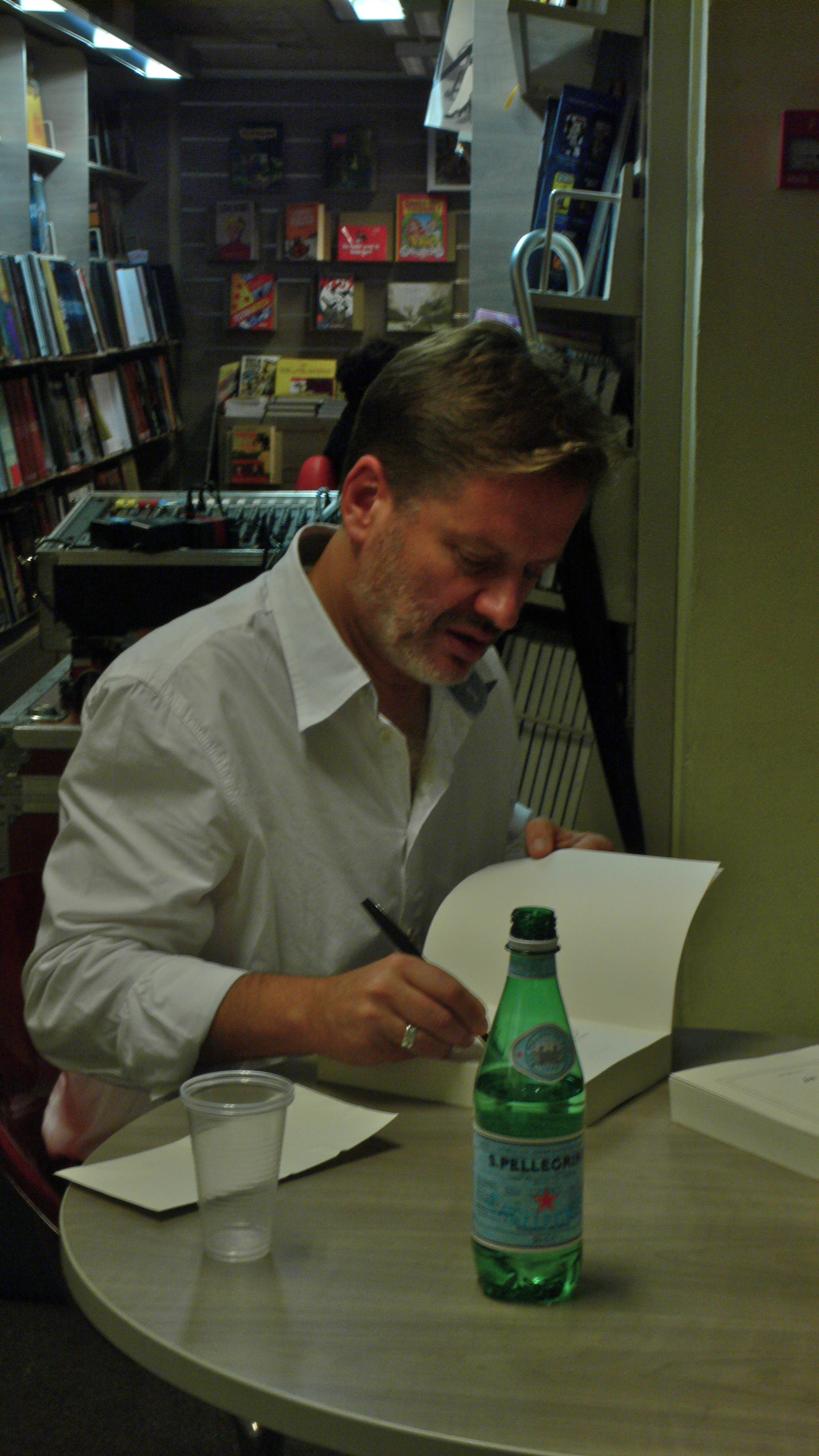
- Alexis Jenni at a book signing in Lyon in November 2011.
- Born: April 1963 (age 63); Lyon, France
- Occupations: Novelist, biology teacher
- Children: 3
- Writing career
- Genre: Historical fiction
- Notable work: L'Art français de la guerre

Alexis Jenni (born 1963) is a French novelist and biology teacher. His debut novel, The French Art of War, won the 2011 Prix Goncourt, France's most prestigious literary award.

== Biography ==
Jenni was born in 1963 in Lyon, France. A father of three, he has a degree in biology, and is a professor in the life sciences at the Lycée Saint-Marc in Lyon.

== Works ==
=== The French Art of War ===
His debut novel, L'Art français de la guerre (The French Art of War) was published on 18 August 2011, and was awarded the Prix Goncourt on 2 November 2011. In reaction to the award, Jenni said "I didn't even think I would be published, so the Goncourt wasn't even worth thinking about." The novel deals with France's colonial history in Indochina and Algeria, and was partly inspired by the debate on French identity that developed under the government of President Nicolas Sarkozy. Rather than expressing his personal opinion on the debate, Jenni wanted to make his readers think about it themselves. As well as winning the Prix Goncourt, the novel was shortlisted for the Prix Médicis and the Prix Femina.

L'Art français de la guerre was technically Jenni's third novel, but was the first to be published. He had previously written a novel which he never submitted to a publisher, and another which was not accepted. According to Jenni, L'Art français de la guerre took five years to write. He stated that he was a "Sunday writer, just as there are Sunday painters."

=== Le Passeport de monsieur Nansen ===
This book about Fridtjof Nansen was published in 2022 by Nancy Paulsen Books.
