= 1959 in literature =

This article contains information about the literary events and publications of 1959.

== Events ==
- January 31 – Sandu Tudor begins a 40-year sentence at Jilava Prison for "conspiracy against social order" and "intense activity against the working class", as meted out by a Romanian communist tribunal. He will die in 1962 at Aiud prison, possibly due to torture.
- April 30 – Bertolt Brecht's Saint Joan of the Stockyards receives its stage première. It was originally performed on radio in 1932.
- May 7 – Scientist and novelist C. P. Snow delivers in the Senate House, University of Cambridge a Rede Lecture on The Two Cultures, to do with a perceived breakdown of communication between the sciences and humanities. It is later published as The Two Cultures and the Scientific Revolution.
- May 28 – The Mermaid Theatre opens in the City of London.
- July 21 – D. H. Lawrence's Lady Chatterley's Lover is one of three books whose bans are overturned in court with assistance from the lawyer Charles Rembar in the United States, the others being Tropic of Cancer and Fanny Hill. The book, published in 1928, legally circulates in the U.S. after a 31-year obscenity ban.
- July 29 – The U.K. Obscene Publications Act becomes law, coming into force on August 29. It requires a work to be seen as a whole, permitting a "public good" defence against a prosecution for obscenity, and making prosecutions for obscene libel difficult.
- September – Anthony Burgess, teaching in Brunei, suffers a breakdown and is forced to return to the UK, where he becomes a full-time novelist.
- October 29 – Astérix the Gaul makes a first appearance in the first regular issue of the comic magazine Pilote.
- November 11 – In the United States, the short film Pull My Daisy is released, adapted from an unperformed play by Jack Kerouac, Beat Generation, and narrated by him. It stars poets Allen Ginsberg, Peter Orlovsky and Gregory Corso.
- unknown dates
  - Aldous Huxley turns down a knighthood.
  - Colin Dexter begins teaching at Corby Grammar School.
  - Frank Herbert begins researching Dune.
  - Frederik Pohl becomes an editor of the American science fiction magazine Galaxy.
  - Marcel Achard is elected to the Académie française.
  - Literature Wales is established as The Academi Gymreig.
  - The first butoh performance, Kinjiki by Tatsumi Hijikata, is played at a dance festival in Japan. It is based on the novel of that name (Forbidden Colors) by Yukio Mishima and explores the taboos of male homosexuality and pedophilia.

== New books ==
=== Fiction ===
- Eric Ambler – Passage of Arms
- Isaac Asimov – Nine Tomorrows
- H.E. Bates – A Breath of French Air
- Saul Bellow – Henderson the Rain King
- Derek Bickerton – Payroll
- Robert Bloch – Psycho
- Antoine Blondin – A Monkey in Winter (Un Singe en hiver)
- Heinrich Böll – Billiards at Half-Past Nine (Billard um halb zehn)
- Ray Bradbury – A Medicine for Melancholy
- Jurij Brězan – Der Gymnasiast
- John Brophy – The Day They Robbed the Bank of England
- John Brunner
  - Echo in the Skull
  - The World Swappers
- Algis Budrys – The Falling Torch
- William S. Burroughs – Naked Lunch
- Taylor Caldwell – Dear and Glorious Physician
- John Dickson Carr – Scandal at High Chimneys: A Victorian Melodrama
- Henry Cecil – Settled Out of Court
- James Hadley Chase – The World in My Pocket
- Agatha Christie – Cat Among the Pigeons
- Ivy Compton-Burnett – A Heritage and Its History
- Barbara Comyns – The Vet's Daughter
- Richard Condon – The Manchurian Candidate
- Evan S. Connell – Mrs. Bridge
- Alexander Cordell – Rape of the Fair Country
- Julio Cortázar – Las armas secretas (The Secret Weapons, short stories)
- Richard Crichton – The Great Impostor
- Cecil Day-Lewis – The Widow's Cruise
- Allen Drury – Advise and Consent
- Alfred Duggan – Children of the Wolf
- Jane Duncan – My Friends the Miss Boyds (first in the My Friends series of 19 books)
- Shusaku Endo (遠藤 周作) – Wonderful Fool (おバカさん)
- William Faulkner – The Mansion
- Ian Fleming – Goldfinger
- Sarah Gainham – The Stone Roses
- Paul Gallico – Mrs. 'Arris Goes to Paris
- William Golding – Free Fall
- Richard Gordon – Doctor and Son
- Günter Grass – The Tin Drum (Die Blechtrommel)
- Walter Greenwood – Saturday Night at the Crown
- Vasily Grossman – Life and Fate («Жизнь и судьба»; completed but unpublished until the 1980s)
- Mark Harris – Wake Up, Stupid
- Robert A. Heinlein
  - The Menace From Earth
  - Starship Troopers
  - The Unpleasant Profession of Jonathan Hoag
- Dorothy Hewett – Bobbin Up
- Hwang Sun-won – "Rain Shower" (소나기, Sonagi, short story)
- Jabra Ibrahim Jabra – Tammūz fī al-Madīnah (Tammuz in the city)
- Michael Innes – Hare Sitting Up
- Shirley Jackson – The Haunting of Hill House
- Uwe Johnson – Mutmassungen über Jakob (Speculations about Jakob)
- John Knowles – A Separate Peace
- Manuel Lopes – O Galo Que Cantou na Baía
- H. P. Lovecraft etc. – The Shuttered Room and Other Pieces
- John Lymington – Night of the Big Heat
- John D. MacDonald
  - Deadly Welcome
  - The Beach Girls
  - The Crossroads
- Ross Macdonald – The Galton Case
- Colin MacInnes – Absolute Beginners
- Compton Mackenzie – The Lunatic Republic
- Alistair MacLean
  - The Last Frontier
  - Night Without End
- Naguib Mahfouz – Children of Gebelaawi (أولاد حارتنا)
- Norman Mailer – Advertisements for Myself
- Ngaio Marsh – Singing in the Shrouds
- James A. Michener – Hawaii
- Walter M. Miller Jr. – A Canticle for Leibowitz
- Gladys Mitchell – The Man Who Grew Tomatoes
- V.S. Naipaul – Miguel Street
- Patrick O'Brian – The Unknown Shore
- Mervyn Peake – Titus Alone
- David Piper (as Peter Towry) – Trial by Battle
- Raymond Queneau – Zazie in the Metro (Zazie dans le Métro)
- Robert Randall (as Robert Silverberg and Randall Garrett) – The Dawning Light
- Mordecai Richler – The Apprenticeship of Duddy Kravitz
- Kate Roberts – Te yn y grug (short stories)
- Philip Roth – Goodbye, Columbus
- Robert Ruark – Poor No More
- Nathalie Sarraute – Le Planétarium
- André Schwarz-Bart – The Last of the Just (Le Dernier des justes)
- Mary Shelley (died 1851) – Mathilda (novella, written 1819–20)
- Alan Sillitoe – The Loneliness of the Long Distance Runner
- Andrew Sinclair – The Breaking of Bumbo, My Friend Judas
- Aimée Sommerfelt – The Road to Agra (Veien til Agra)
- Terry Southern – The Magic Christian
- Howard Spring – All the Day Long
- Rex Stout – Plot It Yourself
- Valerie Taylor – The Girls in 3-B
- John Updike – The Same Door
- Kurt Vonnegut – The Sirens of Titan
- Keith Waterhouse – Billy Liar
- Sheila Watson – The Double Hook

=== Children and young people ===
- Rev. W. Awdry – The Little Old Engine (Fourteenth in The Railway Series of 42 books by him and his son Christopher Awdry)
- Bruce Carter – Four Wheel Drift
- René Goscinny – Le petit Nicolas
- Joseph Krumgold – Onion John
- Spike Milligan – Silly Verse for Kids
- Bill Peet
  - Hubert's Hair-Raising Adventure
  - Goliath II
- Dr. Seuss – Happy Birthday to You!
- Margery Sharp – The Rescuers (first in the eponymous series of nine novels)

=== Drama ===
- Edward Albee
  - The Death of Bessie Smith (written)
  - The Zoo Story (premiered in German)
- Jean Anouilh – Becket
- John Arden – Serjeant Musgrave's Dance
- Alan Ayckbourn (as Roland Allen) – The Square Cat
- Samuel Beckett – Embers (first broadcast)
- Bertolt Brecht (died 1956) – Saint Joan of the Stockyards (Die Heilige Johanna der Schlachthöfe, first stage performance)
- Albert Camus – The Possessed (Les Possédés)
- Beverley Cross – One More River
- William Douglas Home – Aunt Edwina
- Refik Erduran – Cengiz Han’ın Bisikleti (The Bicycle of Genghis Khan)
- Jack Gelber – The Connection
- Jean Genet – The Blacks: A Clown Show (Les Nègres, clownerie, first performed)
- Lorraine Hansberry – A Raisin in the Sun
- Eugène Ionesco – The Killer (Tueur sans gages)
- Geoffrey Lumsden – Caught Napping
- Harold Pinter – The Caretaker (first published)
- Zofia Posmysz – Pasażerka z kabiny 45 (Passenger from Cabin 45, radio drama)
- Jean-Paul Sartre – The Condemned of Altona (Les Séquestrés d'Altona, translated as Loser Wins)
- N. F. Simpson – One Way Pendulum
- Wole Soyinka – The Lion and the Jewel
- Arnold Wesker
  - Roots
  - The Kitchen
- Tennessee Williams – Sweet Bird of Youth
- Egon Wolff – Parejas de trapo
- Zhou Xinfang with Xu Siyan – Hai Rui Submits His Memorial (海瑞上疏, Hai Rui Shangshu)

=== Non-fiction ===
- Kenneth Anger – Hollywood Babylon
- L. Sprague de Camp – Engines
- August Derleth
  - Arkham House: The First 20 Years
  - Some Notes on H. P. Lovecraft
- Savitri Devi – Impeachment of Man
- G. H. Dury – The Face of the Earth
- C. S. Forester – Sink the Bismarck! (also as The Last Nine Days of the Bismarck)
- Georges Friedmann – Signal d'une troisième voie?
- Erving Goffman – The Presentation of Self in Everyday Life
- Laurie Lee – Cider With Rosie
- Miguel León-Portilla – Visión de los vencidos: Relaciones indígenas de la conquista
- Garrett Mattingly – The Defeat of the Spanish Armada
- Czesław Miłosz – Rodzinna Europa (Native Realm)
- Iona and Peter Opie – The Lore and Language of Schoolchildren
- James Pope-Hennessy – Queen Mary 1867–1953
- Karl Popper – The Logic of Scientific Discovery
- Cornelius Ryan – The Longest Day
- William Strunk Jr. and E. B. White – The Elements of Style
- Wilfred Thesiger – Arabian Sands
- Barbara Wootton, Baroness Wootton of Abinger (with V. G. Seal and R. Chambers) – Social Science and Social Pathology

== Births ==
- January 8 – Ovidiu Pecican, Romanian writer and poet
- January 9 – Rigoberta Menchú, Guatemalan writer and Nobel Peace Prize winner
- January 20 – R. A. Salvatore, American science fiction and fantasy author
- January 28 – Megan McDonald, American children's author
- February 2 – Jari Tervo, Finnish author
- March 11 – Dejan Stojanović, Serbian-American poet and essayist
- March 15 – Ben Okri, Nigerian poet and novelist
- March 18 – Frédéric-Yves Jeannet, French-born writer in French and Spanish
- April 15 – Emma Thompson, English actress and screenwriter
- April 30 – Alessandro Barbero, Italian historian, novelist and essayist
- c. May 1 – Yasmina Reza, French novelist and dramatist
- May 3 – Ben Elton, English comedian, novelist and screenwriter
- May 13 – Zeruya Shalev, Israeli novelist
- June 12 – Hilary McKay, English children's writer
- June 13 – Maurice G. Dantec, French science fiction author
- July 19 – Vigdis Hjorth, Norwegian novelist
- August 6 – Deborah Levy, South African-born British writer
- August 17 – Jonathan Franzen, American essayist and novelist
- August 27 – Jeanette Winterson, English novelist
- September 9 – Matti Rönkä, Finnish television journalist and novelist
- September 29
  - Jon Fosse, Norwegian fiction writer, playwright and poet
  - Benjamin Sehene, Rwandan writer
- October 1 – Brian P. Cleary, American humorist, author and poet
- October 7 – Steven Erikson, Canadian novelist and fantasy author
- October 31 – Neal Stephenson, American science fiction writer
- November 1 – Susanna Clarke, English novelist
- November 22 – Christoph Klimke, German writer
- December 20 – Sandra Cisneros, Mexican-born American author
- unknown dates
  - Moira Young, Canadian children's novelist

== Deaths ==
- January 3 – Edwin Muir, Scottish poet, novelist and translator (born 1887)
- January 14 – G. D. H. Cole, English political theorist, economist and historian (born 1889)
- January 26 – Margaret Elizabeth Egan, American librarian (born 1905)
- January 29 – Pauline Smith, South African novelist (born 1882)
- February 20 – Laurence Housman, English playwright and writer (born 1865)
- February 22 – Percy F. Westerman, English children's author (born 1876)
- February 23 – Luis Palés Matos, Puerto Rican poet (heart failure) (born 1898)
- February 28 – Maxwell Anderson, American playwright and film writer (born 1888)
- March 4 – W. W. Greg, English literary scholar (born 1875)
- March 17 – Galaktion Tabidze (Galaktioni), Georgian poet (suicide, born 1892)
- March 26 – Raymond Chandler, American crime writer (born 1888)
- April 12 – James Gleason, American actor, playwright and screenwriter (born 1882)
- April 14 – Julien Josephson, American screenwriter (born 1881)
- April 16 – Ramón Armando Rodríguez, Venezuelan writer (born 1895)
- May 15 – Jeanne de Flandreysy, French writer (born 1874)
- May 18 – Apsley Cherry-Garrard, English memoirist and explorer (born 1886)
- May 20 – Alfred Schütz, Austrian philosopher and sociologist (born 1899)
- May 30 – Raúl Scalabrini Ortiz, Argentine writer, journalist, essayist and poet (born 1898)
- June 1 – Sax Rohmer (Arthur Henry Ward), English novelist (born 1883)
- June 23 – Boris Vian, French novelist (heart attack, born 1920)
- June 30 – José Vasconcelos, Mexican poet and political writer (born 1882)
- July 3 – Johan Bojer, Norwegian novelist (born 1872)
- July 26 – Manuel Altolaguirre, Spanish poet, editor and publisher (car accident, born 1905)
- August 8 – Emil František Burian, Czech poet, journalist and playwright (born 1904)
- September 5 – Marta Rădulescu, Romanian novelist and poet (born 1912)
- September 14 – Laxmi Prasad Devkota, Nepali poet, playwright, and novelist (born 1909)
- September 18 – Benjamin Péret, French poet (born 1899)
- October 12 – Arnolt Bronnen, Austrian playwright and director (born 1895)
- November 29 – Hans Henny Jahnn, German playwright and novelist (born 1894)
- December 2 – Giuseppe Zucca, Italian screenwriter (born 1887)

== Awards ==
- Carnegie Medal for children's literature: Rosemary Sutcliff, The Lantern Bearers
- Friedenspreis des Deutschen Buchhandels: Theodor Heuss
- Hugo Award for Best Novel: James Blish, A Case of Conscience
- James Tait Black Memorial Prize for fiction: Morris West, The Devil's Advocate
- James Tait Black Memorial Prize for biography: Christopher Hassall, Edward Marsh
- Miles Franklin Award: Vance Palmer, The Big Fellow
- Newbery Medal for children's literature: Elizabeth George Speare, The Witch of Blackbird Pond
- Nobel Prize in Literature: Salvatore Quasimodo
- Premio Nadal: Ana María Matute, Primera memoria
- Prix Goncourt: André Schwarz-Bart, Le dernier des Justes
- Pulitzer Prize for Drama: Archibald MacLeish, J. B.
- Pulitzer Prize for Fiction: Robert Lewis Taylor, The Travels of Jaimie McPheeters
- Pulitzer Prize for Poetry: Stanley Kunitz, Selected Poems 1928-1958
- Queen's Gold Medal for Poetry: Francis Cornford
