= Tzadikim Nistarim =

Judaic notion of 36 righteous people

The Tzadikim Nistarim (Hebrew: צַדִיקִים נִסתָּרים, "hidden righteous ones") or Lamed Vav Tzadikim (Hebrew: ל"ו צַדִיקִים,x"36 righteous ones"), often abbreviated as Lamed Vav(niks),^{[a]} refers to 36 righteous people, a notion rooted in the mystical dimensions of Judaism. The singular form is Tzadik Nistar (Hebrew: צַדִיק נִסתָר).

== Origins ==
The existence of 36 righteous people is first mentioned in the Talmud: "There are no fewer than 36 righteous people in the world who greet the Shekhinah in each generation."

Another Talmudic passage mentions the righteous people, most unknown, who sustain the world, but gives a number other than 36:

A homer of barley, and a letech of barley" (Hosea 3:2)—[this refers to] 45 righteous who cause the world to be sustained ... 30 in the land of Israel and 15 here [in Babylonia]. Abaye said: And most of them can be found in the synagogue, under the upper room [i.e. among the unhonored masses].

These two sources were combined into the idea that 36 righteous people sustain the world. The combination may have derived from the fact that to "greet the Shekhinah" was associated with Temple service and that was considered to sustain the world (Pirkei Avot 1:2).

The idea of 36 righteous people was fleshed out in later generations:

As a mystical concept, the number 36 is even more intriguing. It is said that at all times there are 36 special people in the world, and that were it not for them, all of them, if even one of them was missing, the world would come to an end. The two Hebrew letters for 36 are the lamed, which is 30, and the vav, which is 6. Therefore, these 36 are referred to as the Lamed-Vav Tzadikim.

The idea is particularly prominent in Hasidic Judaism. Tzvi Elimelech Spira of Dinov, for example, wrote, "in every generation, there are great righteous people who could perform wondrous acts, but the generation is not deserving of that, so the stature of the righteous people is hidden and they are not known to the public; sometimes they are woodchoppers or water-drawers."

=== Revealed and hidden righteous ===
On Daniel 12:3 ("...those who lead the masses to righteousness will be like the stars forever and ever"), the midrash comments, "just as the stars are sometimes revealed and sometimes hidden, so, too with righteous people. And just as there are innumerable clusters of stars, so, too, there are innumerable clusters of righteous people", implying that there are significantly more than 36.

== Their purpose ==
According to mystical Hasidic Judaism and other segments of Judaism, 36 righteous people justify the purpose of humanity in the eyes of God. Jewish tradition holds that their identities are unknown to each other and that, if one of them realized their purpose, they would never admit it:

The Lamed-Vav Tzaddikim are also called the Nistarim ("concealed ones"). In our folk tales, they emerge from their self-imposed concealment and, by the mystic powers which they possess, they succeed in averting the threatened disasters of a people persecuted by the enemies that surround them. They return to their anonymity as soon as their task is accomplished, "concealing" themselves once again in a Jewish community wherein they are relatively unknown. The lamed-vavniks, scattered as they are throughout the Diaspora, have no acquaintance with one another. On very rare occasions, one of them is "discovered" by accident, in which case the secret of their identity must not be disclosed. The lamed-vavniks do not themselves know that they are one of the 36. In fact, tradition has it that should a person claim to be one of the 36, that is proof positive that they are certainly not one. Since the 36 are each exemplars of anavah ("humility"), having such a virtue would preclude against one’s self-proclamation of being among the special righteous. The 36 are simply too humble to believe that they are one of the 36.

== Lamedvovniks ==
Lamedvovnik (Yiddish: למד־װאָװניק) is the Yiddish term for one of the 36 humble righteous ones or Tzadikim mentioned in kabbalah or Jewish mysticism. According to this teaching, at any given time there are at least 36 Tzadikim. They are hidden; i.e., nobody knows who they are. According to some versions of the story, they themselves may not know who they are. For the sake of these 36 hidden saints, God preserves the world even if the rest of humanity has degenerated into total barbarism. This resembles the story of Sodom and Gomorrah in the Hebrew Bible, where God tells Abraham that he will spare Sodom if there is a quorum of at least 10 righteous men. Since nobody knows who the Lamedvovniks are, not even themselves, every Jew should act as if he or she might be one of them; i.e., lead a holy and humble life and pray for the sake of fellow human beings. It is also said that one of them could be the Jewish Messiah if the world is ready for them to reveal themself. Otherwise, they live and die as an ordinary person. Whether the person knows they are the potential Messiah is debated.

The term lamedvovnik derives from the Hebrew letters Lamed (L) and Vav (V), whose numerical value sums to 36. The "nik" at the end is a Russian or Yiddish suffix indicating "a person who" (as in "beatnik"; in English, this would be something like calling them "The Thirty-Sixers".) In gematria (a Jewish form of numerology), 18 stands for life, because the Hebrew letters that spell chai, meaning "living", sum to 18. Because 36 is twice 18, it represents two lives.

In some Hasidic stories, disciples consider their Rebbes and other religious figures to be among the Lamedvovniks. It is also possible for a Lamedvovnik to reveal themself as such, although that rarely happens—a Lamedvovnik's status as an exemplar of humility would preclude it. More often, the disciples speculate.

These beliefs are articulated in the works of Max Brod, and some (like Jorge Luis Borges) believe the concept to have originated in the Book of Genesis 18:26:

And the Lord said, If I find in Sodom fifty righteous within the city, then I will spare all the place for their sakes.

== In popular culture ==
- In Abraham Goldfaden's 1880 play The Flying Matchmaker, Pinkhsel surmises that Kuni-Leml, the man betrothed to his daughter Carolina, is a "lamed-vavnik" because of the mysterious changes to his behavior and ability. In fact, it is Max, Carolina's love interest, who keeps reentering the house disguised as Kuni-Leml.
- Hans Rehfisch wrote the 1925 play Nickel and the 36 Righteous.
- Jorge Luis Borges has an entry for the "Lamed Wufniks" in his Book of Imaginary Beings (1957–1969).
- In Andre Schwarz-Bart's 1959 novel The Last of the Just, one Just Man of the Lamed-Vov is designated in each generation of the Levy family. Their legacy spans more than eight centuries. The original French title was Le dernier des justes.
- Ben-Zion depicts the Lamed Vav Tzadikim in his 1980 portfolio The 36 Unknown.
- The CBS Mystery Theater episode "The 36th Man" features a newly ordained Lamed Vovnik whom Satan attempts to corrupt so the world will end.
- In Gary Jennings's 1984 novel The Journeyer, Marco Polo is periodically saved from death by the 36. The rescuer's identity is never explicit, and he may be more than one of the Righteous Men.
- In the 1991 issue "Three Septembers and a January" of Neil Gaiman's comic The Sandman, Death tells the soul of Joshua Norton: "they say that the world rests on the backs of 36 living saints—36 unselfish men and women. Because of them the world continues to exist. They are the secret kings and queens of this world." The implication is that he was one of the tzadikim.
- Jonathan Carroll's 1992 fantasy novella "Uh-Oh City" features one of the Lamed Vav.
- In the 1998 documentary The Cruise, it is suggested that the film's subject, Timothy "Speed" Levitch, a tour guide for Manhattan's Gray Line double-decker buses, is a Lamed Vovnik.
- The protagonist of Jodi Picoult's 1999 novel Keeping Faith is believed to be one of the Lamed Vovnik by a rabbi.
- In Werner Herzog's 2001 film Invincible, a fictionalized account of the life of Jewish strongman Zishe Breitbart (aka Siegmund Breitbart), a rabbi tells Zishe (played by Jouko Ahola) that he may be one of the 36 just men who feel the suffering of the world.
- Michael Haneke's 2003 movie Time of the Wolf refers to the 36 and hints that one character is one of them.
- In Nicole Krauss's 2005 novel The History of Love, Alma's brother Bird believes himself to be a Lamed Vovnik.
- Sam Bourne's 2006 novel The Righteous Men depicts the murders of the 36, one by one.
- The protagonist of Michael Chabon's 2007 novel The Yiddish Policemen's Union is involved in the case of a murder victim who may have been the Tzadik Ha-dor.
- The 2007 novel The Book of Names, by Jill Gregory and Karen Tintori, is based on the principles of the Kabbalah, including the 36 Lamed Vovniks.
- In the 2008 TV film God on Trial, a rabbi in Auschwitz is proclaimed by a fellow prisoner to be one of the 36.
- In the 2009 Coen Brothers film A Serious Man, a rabbi says in a character's eulogy that he might have been a Lamed Vovnik.
- In Colum McCann's 2009 novel Let the Great World Spin, the narrator mentions hearing of the myth of "thirty-six hidden saints" while in college and compares the actions of his Christian brother Corrigan to one of the saints.
- In "Music of the Spheres", a 2012 first-season episode of the TV series Touch, Jacob "Jake" Bohm, a mute boy who mysteriously feels the suffering of those in his path and aims to adjust their fates for the better, is revealed as possibly one of the "Lamed Vav Tzadikim" by a Hasidic man. In the second season, Jake and others who have special gifts are referred to as members of the 36; throughout the episodes they are exploited for their abilities and hunted down by one who believes they have too much power. The final episode considers Kabbalah and the mystical roots of the legend of 36.
- In Ted Dekker's 2013 novel Eyes Wide Open, the 36 are a group of children called Project Showdown. Christian monks raised orphans to follow the path of light, attempting to rebirth the Earth into a new age.
- In "Oh Holy Night", a 2016 episode of the TV series Transparent, a rabbi discusses who the 36 people who sustain the world's righteousness may be. "Who are these 36? We don't know. Even the 36 don't know. So what is the lesson? The lesson is to treat each other...as if we might be one. Or who knows? You might be standing next to one now."
- In the 2017 TV series Kevin (Probably) Saves the World, the title character is chosen to be a righteous soul who has to find and initiate the other 35.

== See also ==
- Elijah Loans
- Leone Modena
- Meir ben Ezekiel ibn Gabbai
- Yom-Tov Lipmann Heller
- Yoel Baal Shem
- Secret Chiefs

== Notes ==
- ^{a} In Hebrew numerals, 30 is lamed (Hebrew: ל), and 6 is vav (Hebrew: ו). The number 36 is written Hebrew: ל״ו.
