= Klimke =

Klimke is a surname. Notable people with the surname include:

- Christoph Klimke, German writer
- Ingrid Klimke (born 1968), German eventing rider
- Jürgen Klimke (born 1948), German politician
- Reiner Klimke (1936–1999), German equestrian
- Rudolf Klimke (1890–1986), World War flying ace
