= The Righteous Men =

2006 novel by Sam Bourne

- UK Paperback Cover
- Author: Sam Bourne (Also known as Jonathan Freedland)
- Language: English
- Genre: Religion, Thriller, Crime, Mystery novel
- Publisher: HarperCollins (UK)
- Publication date: 18 March 2006 (U.S.) & 1 July 2006 (UK)
- Publication place: United Kingdom
- Media type: Print (hardback & paperback)
- Pages: 448 pages (UK Hardback), 568 pages (UK Paperback)
- ISBN: 0-06-113829-0
- OCLC: 65820439
- Dewey Decimal: 823/.92 22
- LC Class: PR6102.O92 R54 2006

The Righteous Men is a novel written by Sam Bourne, a pseudonym of English journalist Jonathan Freedland. The story is about a half-British news reporter, Will Monroe (Jr), Jewish Occult Mysticism, Kabbalah, Hasidic Judaism, and the nefarious Christian sect known as Church of the Reborn Jesus.

== Plot summary ==
Will Monroe's normal life is disrupted when his wife is kidnapped while he is reporting on a story of a militia man found dead in his isolated log cabin. Further investigation into the death brings Monroe to the conclusion that the dead militia man shared an attribute with a New York City pimp, also recently murdered. They were both described as being 'righteous'. As more murders of 'righteous men' happen across the globe, time seems to be running out for Will and the old and current friends he has enlisted. With a series of clues from a mysterious source, absurd twists and religious factors Will soon finds himself in the middle of a plot to bring about nothing less than Judgement Day.

The book focuses on the fact that several people have been murdered in what can only be described as a humane way. What these victims have in common is that they have been described by folk who knew them as "righteous" (hence the title) although they led some mundane or unethical existence (i.e. pimps, drug barons or even call centre employees). Nothing seems to fit to connect the murders together. A rookie NY Times reporter is sent on a murder case (the pimp) and is then sent off to do a story in Seattle where he finds another victim here whilst trying to report on freak weather conditions. While he's away, his wife gets kidnapped by what turns out to be the Hassidic community in Crown Heights, Brooklyn.

What these "Righteous Men" turn out to be are based on Jewish folklore: that the world rests on 36 men who perform righteous acts to others. They themselves may not know that they are one of 36 and will always lead a life so far removed from what they are about. But without these men – the world will not be spared by God. So while the killing of the real 36 continues, the world (according to this story) is in grave danger. The killings seem to be done in the name of God; but as it is a Jewish story, why would they want this to happen? It turns out that the killings are being done by a faction of the Christian Church (The Church of the Reborn Jesus) who hold the notion that the Jews have forfeited their role as the chosen people (replacement theology) and by killing the 36 should bring about the Second Coming (something the Jews do not believe).

== Reception ==
It was described as "The biggest challenger to Dan Brown's (author of The Da Vinci Code) crown" by the British newspaper The Mirror.

The book made a brief appearance in the gossip columns when a damning review by Michael Dibdin, originally written for The Guardian, appeared instead in The Times. Ian Mayes, The Guardian's readers' editor, discovered that when Dibdin originally submitted his review to The Guardian, he offered to withdraw it if it were deemed too awkward to publish – an offer the editor, Alan Rusbridger, accepted.

The Righteous Men was picked as a Richard and Judy Summer Read in June 2006 and soon rose to the top of The Sunday Times bestsellers' list. It stayed on the list for several months and has now sold more than half a million copies in the UK; it has been translated into 30 languages.

== See also ==
- Supersessionism
- Hasidic Judaism
