= Bring Home the Revolution =

1998 non-fiction book by Jonathan Freedland

- Author: Jonathan Freedland
- Language: English
- Genre: Non-Fiction, Politics
- Publisher: Fourth Estate
- Publication date: 1998
- Publication place: United Kingdom
- Pages: 246
- ISBN: 978-1-85702-547-7

Bring Home the Revolution: The Case For a British Republic is a non-fiction book written by Jonathan Freedland, originally published in 1998 by Fourth Estate. Providing a comparison of American and British politics and society, Freedland offers an argument for the introduction of Republicanism in Britain. The book was awarded the Somerset Maugham Award in 1999.

== Synopsis ==
Journalist and broadcaster Jonathan Freedland tours the varied states and regions of the United States meeting people of all racial and cultural persuasions and of all religious and political beliefs in his effort to build a picture of modern American society and the ways in which these people can affect the way politics is carried out in their country, both locally and nationally. From these encounters Freedland learns the values of a republican government and how these values can be brought back across the Atlantic to Britain and benefit the people who first created many elements of this republican ideology.
