= Karen Tintori =

American novelist

- Born: September 1, 1948 (age 78); East Lansing, Michigan, U.S.
- Education: Wayne State University
- Occupation: Author
- Spouse: Lawrence Katz (m. 1972)
- Children: 2
- Parent(s): Raymond; Joanne
- Writing career
- Genres: Fiction; non-fiction
- Website: www.karentintori.com

Karen Tintori (born September 1, 1948) is an Italian-American author of fiction and nonfiction. Her books cover a wide range of human experience, from the mysteries of the Kabbalah to the lives of Italian American immigrants. She writes both as a solo author and in collaboration with New York Times best-selling author Jill Gregory.

== Early life ==
Tintori was born in East Lansing, Michigan. Her father, Raymond, a World War II veteran and Michigan State University graduate, had married a Sicilian American named Joanne two years earlier against the advice of his first-generation Italian-American mother. When she was six weeks old, the new family moved out of their trailer and headed west to Detroit. Tintori was raised in the 1950s and early 1960s, the oldest of three children in a close-knit working-class neighborhood near the predominantly Polish enclave of Hamtramck.

Caught between the values of the old world and a post-war society teeming with change, Tintori's early life was both simple and conflicted. While she fully embraced her Italian heritage, she questioned some of the teachings of the Catholic Church. Her liberal parents encouraged her to be inquisitive and fulfill her potential but to be aware that she still lived in a world of limitations.

== Education ==
Tintori was among that first generation of "liberated" women encouraged to obtain a college education. She has described her transition from salutatorian of a class of 36 at St. Augustine High School to Detroit's Wayne State University in the mid 1960s as life changing:

I hadn't burned my bra, but I didn't wear it, either. The same mother who held me back from wearing nylons, heels, and my first training bra pretended not to notice. Flower children were in bloom, women friends at college were living in communes or marrying without discarding their surnames. Feminism was a far cry from my grandmother's and mother's paths, but hadn't Mama planted its germs in me when she ordered me never to pretend I wasn't as bright as a boy?

— Unto The Daughters

Tintori majored in journalism and became a stringer for The New York Times. She joined the student newspaper, the Daily Collegian, as a staff writer just before New Leftists gained control of the paper in 1967 and changed its name to The South End. While other reporters jumped ship, she stayed on, continuing to write stories free of the political dogma that pervaded the rest of its content. There, she met and started dating another reporter and future law student, Lawrence Katz, who would later become her husband.

Tintori was acquiring an identity. These new people and new ideas changed her dramatically, but she was not a rebel. While she was seriously contemplating conversion to Judaism, she wanted her parents' understanding if not approval. While she shared the tenets of the new feminism, she looked forward to competing in the two traditional Italian beauty contests scheduled for 1968, her sophomore year. That year, she became Miss Detroit Fruit Vendors' Association and Miss Columbus Day.

Tintori earned an undergraduate degree in journalism from Wayne State University in 1970.

In August, 2019, together with her husband, she attended an immersion Italian language course at Scuola Dante Alighieri Recanati, affiliated with the University of Camerino, obtaining an attestato.

== Conversion to Judaism ==
A year after her graduation, Tintori began religious conversion classes. The day had finally arrived to tell her parents:

The tears streamed faster as I thought about their sacrifices to send me to Catholic school, about the Jewish tailor, the boss my father credited with giving him a moral upbringing during the five Depression years he spent in his employ. I thought about my long dissatisfaction with Catholicism and about all that I had found in common with my Jewish friends.

— Unto The Daughters

With her parents' support, Tintori was converted by a beth din at an Orthodox mikveh at the age of 24.

== Marriage and family life ==
In 1972, she was married by a Conservative rabbi to Lawrence Katz. The early years of their marriage were spent establishing professional careers and traveling. In 1979, Tintori gave birth to the couple's first son, Mitchel, and in 1982, to their second, Steven. The couple still lives in the same home in West Bloomfield, Michigan, where they raised their now-grown children.

At a mother-toddler class in 1981, she met another young mother, Jill Gregory, already a best-selling romance novelist. As their children, Mitchel and Rachel, struck up a friendship, so did Tintori and Gregory.

== Early professional career ==
At the urging of her father, Tintori eschewed news journalism for a career in marketing and public relations. She worked for an advertising agency and then a flowers-by-wire organization, as an assistant editor of its monthly magazine, and for a professional organization associated with the automobile industry. In the years before the birth of her first son, she was a marketing officer for a financial institution. When Mitchel was born, she quit to raise him on a full-time basis and never returned to corporate life.

== Writing career ==
Tintori's friendship with Jill Gregory quickly developed into a professional relationship. After trying to figure out a sensitive way to answer their children's questions about life and death, Tintori and Gregory decided to write a book designed to answer a wide range of questions children ask about God. The result was What Does Being Jewish Mean?, in conjunction with Rabbi E.B Freedman, published by Simon & Schuster in 1991. The book has been reprinted 11 times and used by children and adults, Jews and non-Jews alike, as a primer on the basic concepts and principles of Judaism.

Unlike other team efforts, Tintori and Gregory did not divide up or delegate tasks. Instead, they developed their thoughts and wrote in a single style, sitting side by side. This ability to write together, in one voice, has characterized their entire body of work since. Both writers have publicly discussed their writing methodology and the ability of each to anticipate the other's thoughts and even complete her sentences.

The success of their first collaborative effort spurred them on to the next. In 1993, under the pseudonym Jillian Karr (a combination of Jill and Karen), they published Something Borrowed, Something Blue (Doubleday, Bantam Books). The novel - a story of intrigue involving four brides-to-be with secrets - was excerpted by Cosmopolitan Magazine and released as a made-for-TV movie starring Connie Sellecca, Twiggy and Ken Howard.

In 1996, again writing as Jillian Karr, the writing team published Catch Me If You Can (Avon Books), a suspense novel about a kidnapped Miss America.

Both Jillian Karr books were published in hardcover and paperback editions and in multiple languages.

Having been told that her paternal grandfather had survived the Cherry Mine disaster, the worst mine fire in the history of the United States, Tintori began an exploration into the disaster that took the lives of 259 men and boys deep inside an Illinois coal mine. The result was Trapped: The 1909 Cherry Mine Disaster (Atria Books, 2002). The book explores the senseless way the fire began, the failed efforts to rescue those down below, the heroism both above and below ground, and the impact it had on the lives of those involved. Increasingly interested in her family genealogy and heritage, she recounts the experiences of immigrants, including her own relatives, who had recently come from countries throughout Europe - particularly Italy - seeking success and finding only suffering and death in that mine. After its hardcover release, the book was published in paperback.

Trapped has been optioned for film.

In 2007, she returned to the world of fiction, again collaborating with her writing partner. Now writing as Karen Tintori and Jill Gregory, the duo published The Book of Names (St. Martin's Press). The book is a thriller based on the actual principles of the Kabbalah, which teaches that the world's existence requires that it be occupied by 36 righteous souls, called Lamed Vovniks, or Tzadikim Nistarim in Hebrew.

The novel begins with 33 of them murdered and the start of a race to keep them alive. The book has been published worldwide and translated into 20 languages. In particular, it is a best-seller in Germany, where websites and contests have been created about the book, with prizes including a trip to England.

The book is published in hardcover, paperback, audio and electronic formats.

Later that same year, Tintori revealed her own family's secret history – buried for 80 years out of guilt and shame – when she published Unto The Daughters: The Legacy of an Honor Killing in a Sicilian-American Family [(St. Martin's Press)]. The book is a narrative nonfiction about the murder of her great-aunt, Frances Costa, in a Sicilian honor killing in Detroit 1919. Tintori has explained that she wrote the book to give Aunt Frances back her name and identity, to expose the ugly customs and traditions of honor for honor's sake, and to restore dignity to the new generations of women who followed. In that sense, Unto The Daughters is not only an account of the legacy of Sicilian culture but an intensely personal family memoir.

The book has been published in hardcover, paperback and electronic formats and was nominated for a Michigan Notable Book Award.

In 2008, The Illumination, another collaboration by Tintori and Gregory, was published by St. Martin's Press and simultaneously by Rowholt in Germany. This spiritual thriller, centered on a biblical treasure from the dawn of creation possessing the power to transform—or destroy—the world, also sold to numerous foreign countries.

The book has been published in hardcover, paperback, audio and electronic formats.

Tintori's first short story, Down Under, was included in the first anthology released by Novelists Inc., published in 2012 by Fiction Studio Books. Edited by Lou Aronica, Cast of Characters is a multi-genre collection of short stories by 28 leading voices in fiction, including 11 New York Times bestselling authors.

The anthology is published in paperback and electronic formats.

Tintori contributed two pieces to Italian Women in Chicago: Madonna Mia! QUI debbo vivere? an anthology published in 2013 by Casa Italia, Chicago. Edited by Dominic Candeloro, Kathy Catrambone, and Gloria Nardini, the book was published the same year in Italy as Donne Italiane a Chicago.

The anthology is printed in paperback.

Tintori has also contributed to She Rises: How Goddess Feminism, Activism, and Spirituality? Volume 2, an anthology by MAGO Books.

She has written for The Fifth Estate, The Detroit Jewish News, Primo Magazine, Ovunque Siamo, and The Hamtramck Citizen (recapping her half hour alone, backstage, with The Beatles).

Tintori is a member of Novelists Inc., International Thriller Writers, the Italian American Studies Association and Italian American Writers Association.

== Relationship to Italy and commitment to Italian-American heritage ==
Increasingly interested in her Italian heritage, Tintori acquired Italian citizenship in 2006, and is now a dual citizen of the U.S. and Italy. She and her husband have been studying the Italian language for many years, have traveled in Italy more than a dozen times, and have grown increasingly close to its land and people. Tintori has cousins on both sides of her family, in Modena, Tuscany, and Sicily. Tintori has also developed working relationships with several other writers in Italy.

Among her paternal ancestors are famed architects Giovanni and Bernardo Parrocchetti from Varese, near Milan. The two designed numerous churches and bridges in Italy. After designing the Ponte d'Olina in Pavullo, which connected Modena with Pistoia for the first time in the 1500s, the two set down roots in that area of Modena. The brothers were granted knighthood by the Duke of Milan.

== Books ==
- What Does Being Jewish Mean? -- Read-Aloud Responses To Questions Jewish Children Ask About History, Culture and Religion by Rabbi E. B. Freedman, Jan Greenberg, Karen A. (Tintori) Katz, Simon & Schuster: Prentice Hall Press 1991; updated Fireside 2003
- Something Borrowed, Something Blue by Jillian Karr, Doubleday 1993; Bantam Books 1994
- Catch Me If You Can by Jillian Karr, Avon 1996
- Trapped: The 1909 Cherry Mine Disaster by Karen Tintori, Atria 2002; Washington Square Press 2003
- The Book of Names by Jill Gregory and Karen Tintori, St. Martin's Press 2007
- Unto The Daughters: The Legacy of an Honor Killing in a Sicilian-American Family by Karen Tintori, St. Martin's Press 2007
- The Illumination by Jill Gregory and Karen Tintori, St. Martin's Press 2008
- Cast of Characters, (including Tintori's short story, Down Under) a Novelists Inc. anthology edited by Lou Aronica, Fiction Studio Books 2012
- Italian Women in Chicago: Madonna Mia! QUI debbo vivere?, (including Tintori's Chicago's Little Saint, and The Woman Who Was Buried in Her Wedding Dress) an anthology edited by Dominic Candeloro, Kathy Catrambone, and Gloria Nardini, published by Casa Italia, Chicago, 2013.
- She Rises: How Goddess Feminism, Activism, and Spirituality? Volume 2, (including Tintori's Lovely Lady, Dark of Hue) an anthology edited by Helen Hye-Hook Hwang, Mary Ann Beavis, and Nicole Shaw, MAGO Books, 2016
