= The Last of the Just =

1959 novel by André Schwarz-Bart

First English edition (publ. Atheneum)

The Last of the Just is a post-war novel by André Schwarz-Bart originally published in French (as Le Dernier des justes) in 1959. It was published in an English translation by Stephen Becker in 1960.

The debut novel of Schwarz-Bart, it won the Prix Goncourt, France's highest literary prize. The author was the son of a Polish Jewish family murdered by the Nazis. He based the story on the medieval massacre of Jews in York.

The story follows the "Just Men" of the Levy family over eight centuries. Each Just Man is a Lamed Vav, according to legend, one of the thirty-six righteous souls whose existence justifies the purpose of humankind to God. Each "bears the world's pains... beginning with the execution of an ancestor in 12th-century York, England... culminat[ing] in the story of a schoolboy, Ernie, the last... executed at Auschwitz."

Critic Michael Dorris in 1991 described the novel as an enduring classic that reminds readers "how easily torn is the precious fabric of civilization, and how destructive are the consequences of dumb hatred - whether a society's henchmen are permitted to beat an Ernie Levy because he's Jewish, or because he's black or gay or Hispanic or homeless".

Gilbert Highet, a Book-of-the-Month Club judge described it as "the saddest novel I have ever read, almost as sad as history".

== Summary ==
The very first sentence, “Our eyes receive the light of dead stars”, shows the reader that they are about to follow a story of a vanished world. Each episode of the family saga comes from Jewish history.

=== Ernie Levy's ancestors ===
Schwarz-Bart begins his book with the massacre of the Jews of York on March 16, 1190. He imagines the story of the Lévy family, who inherited the strange privilege of producing a tzadik in each generation, that is, a righteous person belonging to the Lamed Vav (Lamed-vav in Yiddish). The first of these Lamed Vav was Yom Tov Lévy of York, who died a martyr on March 11, 1185 during a "Kiddush Hashem" (sanctification of God), a mass suicide instigated by the persecution of an English bishop. Schwarz-Bart then quickly recounts the tragic deaths of all the Righteous family members of each generation, up to Haim Levy. He is the first to die in his bed in Zemyock, a small Polish village, leaving behind many sons. The novel then focuses on one of his descendants, Mordechai the peddler, Ernie's grandfather, and on Benjamin, his eldest son, but the most fragile and the least loved by his father. It is then that the village learns that German and French Jews have donned uniforms to fight each other in the First World War. The Righteous of Zemyock then says: " Our unfortunate brothers have become French, German, Turkish, and perhaps Chinese, imagining that by ceasing to be Jewish they would end their suffering ." The Russian Revolution brings about a new wave of antisemitism. The Jews of Zemyock are slaughtered in a pogrom. Benjamin Levy's three brothers perish. Benjamin then leaves Poland and settles in Stillenstadt (the silent city in the Rhineland, Germany, where his parents join him. He marries Lea Blumenthal, a frail German Jew, who bears him three sons, Moritz, Ernie, and Jacob, and other children whose existence is known but whose names are not (see, among others, pages 300 and 304). The family is torn between Jewish traditions and German modernism. Hitler's rise to power triggers anti-Semitic reactions from the inhabitants of the peaceful town. The reader follows the reign of terror to which the poor Jews of Stillenstadt are subjected. The Levy family's life in Germany is described in particular detail. The Levy family has to leave Germany the day after Kristallnacht, on November 12, 1938. They find refuge in France, in the Parisian suburbs. When the war begins, they are suspected of being traitors as Germans. After being imprisoned in Gurs in May 1940, the Levys are eventually handed over to the Germans.

=== Ernie Levy, the last of the righteous ===
Ernie Levy is as frail and small as his father. He is a dreamy child who likes his grandfather's traditional teachings, but also an excellent student with his head full of adventure novels. One day, when the Nazis threaten to attack the worshippers in the synagogue courtyard, young Ernie intervenes and prevents the Jews from being beaten. For his grandfather, Mordechai, it is a revelation. Ernie is a Lamed-Vav, a Righteous Man. He then reads to his grandson the story of the Levy family's martyrdom since the Middle Ages. The child is convinced in turn by the story. But the clumsy and insistent way in which he plays his role as a "Righteous Man" only brings him trouble from the very next day. Like all the Jewish children at his school, Ernie is subjected to harassment and humiliation by the Aryan boys in the courtyard. When Mr. Krémer, the old schoolteacher who protected them, is dismissed, he is replaced by a Nazi from Berlin who relentlessly harasses and humiliates the four Jewish children in Ernie's class. Ernie attempts suicide. He is saved at the last minute by his grandfather. After two years in the hospital, the reader discovers a tough young man, ready to take on the Nazis.

In France, at the beginning of the second world war, Ernie joins the army to prevent his family from being interned. It is all in vain; the Levys are all interned at Gurs in May 1940. After the collapse of the French army, he takes refuge in Marseille. He is determined to live like a dog, that is, to enjoy life without any reference to his Jewishness or spirituality. He settles on a farm. He becomes the lover of the farm's owner, whose husband is a war prisoner in Germany. But one day, the village blacksmith tells him that during a stay in Drancy, he has seen busloads of Jews arriving at the internment camp there: "They all had eyes like I had never seen before and like I hope I will never see again in this life. And when I saw you for the first time (...) I immediately recognized your eyes. Do you understand? " Deeply moved, Ernie realizes that he cannot escape his Jewish identity. In his despair, he begins to open himself up again to "the light of the past" . Deported to Drancy and then to Auschwitz, he disappears in a crematory oven after telling comforting stories to the children in the sealed wagon.

The novel's final page ends with a striking Kaddish (the Jewish prayer for the deaths): "So, this story will not end with some grave to be visited in remembrance. For the smoke rising from the crematoria, like any other, obeys the laws of physics: the particles gather and disperse in the wind, which drives them. The only pilgrimage, esteemed reader, would be to sometimes gaze melancholically at a stormy sky. And Blessed. Auschwitz. Be. Majdanek. The Lord. Treblinka . And blessed. Buchenwald . Be. Mauthausen. The Lord. Belzec . And blessed. Sobibor . Be. Chełmno . The Lord. Ponary. And blessed. Theresienstadt . Be. Warsaw . The Lord. Vilnius . And blessed Skaryzko. Be. Bergen-Belsen. The Lord. Janow. And blessed. Dora. Be. Neuengamme . The Lord. Pustkow. And blessed… »

== Genesis of the book ==
In December 1956 André Schwarz-Bart, a former member of the Resistance and the son of deportees, published excerpts from a novel entitled The Biography of Ernie Lévy in The FSJU Review. The theme explored is that of a segment of the persecuted Jewish people who refuse to use violence in self-defense. He writes, by way of foreword: "...I did not seek (my) hero among the rebels of the Warsaw Ghetto, nor among the Resistance fighters who were also the terrible exception. I preferred him disarmed of heart, remaining naive in the face of evil, like our distant ancestors. This type of hero is not spectacular. It is readily contested today in the name of a more martial humanity... Some would have us believe that a thousand years of Jewish history is nothing but the paltry chronicle of victims and their executioners... I wish to show a Jew of the old lineage, unarmed and without hatred, and yet truly a man, according to a tradition now almost extinct ." André Schwarz-Bart continued to work on his text for a long time and only submitted it to a publisher in its fifth version. It was then published by Seuil in the autumn of 1959 under the title The Last of the Just .

To write his novel, André Schwarz-Bart gathered extensive documentation. He scoured the Jewish collection of the Sainte-Geneviève Library and other libraries in Paris. At the end of his book, he cites the principal works he consulted: Léon Poliakov's *Le Bréviaire de la haine* , Poliakov's *Du Christ aux Juifs de cour* , Michel Borwicz's * Écrits des condamnés à mort* , David Rousset's * L'Univers concentrationnaire* , Georges Wellers's * De Drancy à Auschwitz* , and Olga Wormser's * Tragédie de la déportation * .

The Jewish historian and philosopher Gershom Scholem notes in his analysis of the book: “The publication of André Schwartz-Bart’s novel, The Last of the Just, which by its theme and development has created such a stir among so many readers, has drawn attention to the Jewish folk legend that forms the basis of the book. This legend, widespread in Jewish folklore, speaks of thirty-six Tzadikim, or righteous men, on whom—though they are unknown or hidden—the fate of the world rests. The author of the novel gives this tradition a most imaginative angle. According to some Talmudists, he says, it dates back to ancient times. As a novelist, Schwartz-Bart is not bound by academic conventions and can give free rein to his speculative imagination.”.

== Book reception ==
The book received a number of enthusiastic reviews. Elie Wiesel called it a major work. Arnold Mandel, for his part, stated: "It is a landmark book in novels' production, and especially in the so fragile field of French Jewish literature. Schwarz-Bart is not content with simply having 'talent.' He has a profound sense of the eternal and current tragedy of Jewish destiny... (His book) is a chronicle and a midrash of the epic of Israel at the dawn of Drancy, and also an eschatology, an annunciation of what has just happened, and which people do not understand, so that there is a need for prophet-poets". Mandel, however, notes an imperfect knowledge of the "Jewish domain." The newspaper Combat speaks in its edition of August 13, 1959 of a book "moving, with an epic sweep" which places its author "at the forefront of literary news" and makes him "a kind of messenger of the Jewish people". These laudatory press reviews seem to have frightened Schwarz-Bart somewhat.

In January 23, 1987 Le Monde des Livres, Edgar Reichmann reflected on the importance of The Last of the Just in 20th century French literature: “In 1959, the publication of The Last of the Just, written by André Schwarz-Bart, had the effect of a time bomb, awakening consciences and reviving the messianic vocation of the novel. (It is one of) the rare books awarded the Goncourt Prize that have changed the vision of millions of readers... a text destined to mark generations. ... André Schwarz-Bart (is) the writer who so skillfully transposed Jewish suffering into French, giving it the dimensions of a founding myth... simply a writer who definitively anchored the Shoah in the mythology of the second millennium.”

The Last of the Just emerged as an important book in the Jewish memory of the Holocaust. The book was an immediate commercial success, despite being the author's first novel. When invited to the television literary program "Lectures pour tous" (Readings for all) on October 1, 1959, André Schwarz-Bart declared that he was not the spokesperson for the Jewish people and that his novel constituted a "small white pebble" placed on a grave: "I am asked to make speeches at this grave, I cannot". After the television broadcast, the book sold 45,000 copies. The Goncourt Prize anticipated the announcement of its results in order to be the first one to give an award to the novel. After the Goncourt Prize was awarded, print runs reached 220,000 copies and translation rights were sold in numerous countries. In 1961, the American translation sold 550,000 copies.

After the Goncourt Prize, historian Jules Isaac paid tribute to the book on December 15 in a speech delivered at the Sorbonne: “No, I am not alone. Behind me, an invisible presence, there is an immense crowd: the thousands and thousands of innocent victims, sacrificed generation after generation, the very ones evoked in his first work, so powerful, so moving, by a young Jewish writer whose name is now on everyone’s lips. Thank you, André Schwarz-Bart! What powerful support you bring me!” Marc Chagall offered to illustrate the novel. The book became the subject of a doctoral thesis in 1976, a book in 1986, and various academic works.

The novel was subsequently often used to reinforce what would come to be called the "duty of remembrance." For example, the French National Pedagogical Institute used an excerpt from the novel for an issue of Textes et documents (Texts and documents) dedicated to the National Day of Deportation Remembrance in November 1960. The Last of the Just was in this time considered a seminal work, on par with The Diary of Anne Frank, published in 1950. It also influenced the writing of Daniel Mendelsohn's novel, The Lost . The Yad Vashem memorial chose the Kaddish from The Last of the Just to conclude its exhibit on the concentration camps. This Kaddish is now inscribed in giant letters on a wall of the new museum, inaugurated in 2005 . More recently, the psychoanalyst Gérard Huber stated: "When the Goncourt Prize is awarded to The Last of the Just , what is at stake is identifying with the exterminated ".

In 2021, on a New York Times podcast hosted by Ezra Klein, Noam Chomsky named it as among three books that had particularly influenced him.

=== Accusations of plagiarism ===
In an October 29, 1959 issue, the newspaper France-Observateur asked Schwarz-Bart about rumors of plagiarism. He responded that he had conducted research and taken thousands of notes. He explained that, having not been deported himself, he had to rely on the authentic witness accounts reported by Jewish historians. In November 1959, the Mercure de France pointed out that a passage describing the death of the rabbi of York is taken verbatim from a letter from Madame de Sévigné describing Madame de Brinvilliers's 1676 execution. L'Humanité reported on November 5, 1959 that a scene in the novel is taken verbatim from a short passage in The True Story of Ah Q, Chinese novel by Lu Xun. However, the newspaper clarified that this borrowing was transposed, profoundly modified, and even deepened.
