= Garrett Mattingly =

American historian

Garrett Mattingly (May 6, 1900 – December 18, 1962) was a professor of European history at Columbia University who specialized in early modern diplomatic history. In 1960 he won a Pulitzer Prize for The Defeat of the Spanish Armada.

== Early life and education ==
Born in Washington, D.C., Mattingly attended elementary school in Washington and public high school in Michigan after his family moved to Kalamazoo in 1913. Following graduation, Mattingly served, 1918–1919, as a sergeant in the U. S. Army. He then earned an A. B. summa cum laude at Harvard University (1923) and, while still an undergraduate, studied in France at Strasbourg and Paris and in Florence, Italy. After two years spent working in a New York City publishing house he received his M.A. in history at Harvard (1926) and began his academic career at Northwestern University in Evanston, Illinois, teaching history and literature. There he formed a close personal and professional friendship with writer Bernard DeVoto.

Mattingly completed his PhD at Harvard in 1935, having developed a strong interest in the sixteenth century and coming under the influence of Roger B. Merriman, a specialist in the history of the Spanish Empire. Aided by a Guggenheim Fellowship—of which he was a four-time winner—he spent the academic year 1937–1938 doing intensive research in European archives. In order to read the primary sources, Mattingly taught himself several foreign languages as well as sixteenth-century script.

== Academic career ==
Mattingly's first book was the biography, Catherine of Aragon (1941), a book "extremely careful and accurate and enormously erudite" but with traces of the care, accuracy and erudition "carefully concealed or utterly obliterated." The book was chosen as a selection of the Literary Guild.

During World War II Mattingly served in the U.S. Naval Reserve as a lieutenant commander, but he spent most of his service in Washington, D.C., instructing intelligence officers. In the process, Mattingly learned much about naval operations that would later prove useful writing a best-seller about the Armada. Following the war Mattingly, disappointed in not attaining a Harvard appointment, found a position in the adult program of Cooper Union in New York City, where he "perfected his dramatic style of lecturing." In 1947 Mattingly joined the department of history at Columbia University where he spent the remainder of his career and was appointed William R. Shepherd Professor of European History in 1959. His lectures at Columbia were popular both for their learning and their sprightly presentation. A friend, Leo Gershoy, recalled that Mattingly lectured with head "cocked, eyes sparkling, his smile benign, he talked in a flow of words, witty, gay, and serious, about poetry and drama and novels, about music he loved dearly, about tapestries and paintings he admired, about rich wines and fine food that few appreciated with equal discrimination. He loved, too, to talk about explorers whose voyages he could so fully trace, and about sailing ships, how they were built and manned and how navigated." Mattingly treated his job as a historian "as that of telling a story about people" and he had "a wide-range panoramic vision."

In 1955 Mattingly published Renaissance Diplomacy, a book that made his historical reputation. Exceptionally well researched and citing sources in six languages, Mattingly wrote it in a style both erudite and limpid. As J. H. Hexter later wrote, "If any amount of skill could have made Renaissance Diplomacy a popular book, its author had the skill; but the cards were stacked against him." Nevertheless, Mattingly was so determined not to publish the book with a university press that, at his publisher's recommendation, he cut the manuscript by a third and destroyed the original draft. "It is perhaps a measure of that achievement that the Renaissance Diplomacy which historians read with such admiration is not as good as Mattingly could have made it; it is, indeed, not as good as he had made it. Even so, it remains one of the finest historical works of the past half century."

Mattingly's most successful book was The Armada (1959). As one biographer has written, the book was "written in purple prose but a royal purple, which read like historical fiction." Hailed enthusiastically by critics, the book was a bestseller as both Book-of-the-Month Club and History Book Club selections. Mattingly also won a special Pulitzer Prize for the work. He was an elected member of the American Academy of Arts and Sciences and the American Philosophical Society.

== Critical assessment ==
Although a mild "Norman Thomas socialist" in politics, Mattingly had a "low tolerance for ideologies" both political and professional. He once joked that he was an old-fashioned literary historian like "Will Durant, Irving Fisher and William Hickling Prescott."

== Marriage and later years ==
Mattingly married Gertrude L. McCollum, a teacher, in 1928; the couple had no children. Although his health had been poor for several previous years, Mattingly died unexpectedly of emphysema in 1962 while serving as George Eastman Visiting Professor at Oxford University.

== Works ==
- Catherine of Aragon (1941) LCCN 41-6540
- Renaissance Diplomacy (1955) LCCN 55-2849; Penguin edition (1964) from the Internet Archive
  - Mattingly, Garrett (January 2010). 2010 ebook edition. Cosimo. ISBN 978-1-61640-267-9.
- The Armada (1959) LCCN 59-8861
- Renaissance Profiles (1978) ISBN 9780061311628

== Bibliography ==
- J. H. Hexter, "Garrett Mattingly, Historian", Doing History (Bloomington: Indiana University Press, 1971), 157-72.
