= Night of the Big Heat (film) =

1967 British film by Terence Fisher

- Italian theatrical poster
- Directed by: Terence Fisher
- Written by: Jane Baker; Pip Baker; Ronald Liles
- Based on: Night of the Big Heat; 1959 novel by John Lymington
- Produced by: Tom Blakeley; Ronald Liles
- Starring: Christopher Lee; Patrick Allen; Peter Cushing; Sarah Lawson; Jane Merrow
- Cinematography: Reginald H. Wyer
- Edited by: Rod Nelson-Keys
- Music by: Malcolm Lockyer
- Production company: Planet Film Productions
- Distributed by: Planet Film Distributors
- Release dates: May 1967 (UK); 1971 (USA)
- Running time: 94 minutes
- Country: United Kingdom
- Language: English
- Box office: 509,439 admissions (France)

Night of the Big Heat is a 1967 British science fiction film directed by Terence Fisher, and starring Patrick Allen, Christopher Lee, Peter Cushing and Jane Merrow. It was based on the 1959 novel of the same name by John Lymington, and was released in the UK in May, 1967 by Planet Film Productions.

The film was released much later in the United States in the winter of 1971 by Maron Films, retitled Island of the Burning Damned, where it was paired on a nationwide double bill with Godzilla's Revenge (1969), but the poster art confused it with Island of Terror (1966) which also starred Peter Cushing. The title was changed again years later to Island of the Burning Doomed for American television.

== Plot ==
Jeff and Frankie Callum run The Swan, an inn on the island of Fara, somewhere off the English coast. Jeff, a professional novelist, hires a secretary, but this turns out to be Angela Roberts, a younger woman with whom he had an affair some time before, and who has come to the island with the intent of luring Jeff away from his wife, or at least causing trouble in their marriage. The Callums moved to Fara so that Jeff could escape Angela's amorous advances, although as far as Frankie knows, it was only to escape the tedium of life on the mainland.

Not helping matters is the fact that despite it being the middle of winter, Fara is experiencing a stifling and inexplicable heat wave, with temperatures rising rapidly. It has become so hot that cars stall, beer bottles shatter, televisions explode, and telephones have ceased to work.

Into this tense situation comes Godfrey Hanson, a mysterious scientist from the mainland, who rents a room at The Swan. Hanson spends his time exploring the island, setting up motion-sensitive cameras and taking soil samples. The locals, including the Callums, find this suspicious, especially since quite a lot more is happening on Fara than just the heat and Hanson's snooping.

A tramp is burned to death in a cave by something emitting a high-pitched whirring sound. Later, a farmer claims his sheep are all dead. Hanson examines the dead sheep and finds their corpses are badly burned, whilst Swan regular Bob Hayward is attacked by something on the road while driving into the village. He crashes after being blinded by a bright light, which also creates enough heat to ignite the car's petrol tank. Meanwhile, pub regular Tinker, losing his mind because of the heat, attempts to attack Angela while she is working, but when she hits him over the head with an ashtray, he flees and ends up burned to death as well. Jeff finally confronts Hanson and demands answers from him. According to the scientist, Fara is the site of an invasion by extraterrestrials, whose extremely high temperature burns any living creature that gets too close to them.

Jeff and Hanson resolve to stop the aliens with the help of local physician Dr. Stone, but when Stone tries to get to Fara's meteorological station so he can alert the mainland of the invasion, he is waylaid by the aliens and killed. Hanson tries next, but witnesses the death of Stella Hayward, Bob's wife, and realises the aliens are attracted to light. At the weather station, he learns from meteorologist Ken Stanley and his colleague Foster that the aliens have killed the communications operator and destroyed all their communications equipment, making it impossible to call for help.

Quickly formulating a plan, Hanson is joined by Jeff, Frankie and Angela at the radar station. He and Foster will set fire to bales of hay in a field, attracting the aliens, and then lob dynamite into the field, hopefully destroying them, whilst the others signal for help with flare pistols.

This plan quickly fails, and Foster and then Hanson are both killed. Surrounded by the deadly aliens, the situation looks hopeless when a sudden thunderstorm breaks. Unexpectedly, the rain brings death to the aliens, and Jeff, Frankie, Angela and Ken all survive.

== Cast ==
- Christopher Lee as Professor Godfrey Hanson
- Patrick Allen as Jeff Callum
- Peter Cushing as Dr. Vernon Stone
- Sarah Lawson as Frankie Callum
- Jane Merrow as Angela Roberts
- William Lucas as Ken Stanley
- Percy Herbert as Gerald Foster
- Kenneth Cope as Tinker Mason
- Thomas Heathcote as Bob Hayward
- Anna Turner as Stella Hayward
- Jack Bligh as Ben Siddle
- Sydney Bromley as old tramp

== Production ==
The 1959 novel on which the film is based had been adapted for British television by ITV in 1960. It was intended to use the TV script with some embellishing, but it required several changes and writers Pip and Jane Baker were hired to work on it.

Filming took place at Pinewood Studios, whilst exteriors for the pub around which the action takes place were filmed at The Swan Inn in Milton Keynes Village, which is surrounded by housing rather than the fields seen in the film. The opening shots of what is referred to in the film as the island's meteorological station are actually of the transmitter station at Portland Bill, Dorset.

== Critical reception ==
The Monthly Film Bulletin wrote: "John Lymington's novels are among the most cinematic of science fiction works, but Night of the Big Heat is not one of his best, and here it is given very conventional treatment. Terence Fisher's direction relies largely on the contrast between the false security of the hotel and the island settings and the alien menace lurking in the wings. But though the appearance of the invaders is effectively deferred until the final sequence, the plot is so cluttered up with irrelevancies (like the writer and his mistress from the past) that the atmosphere created by the unseen threat is very soon dissipated. The performances are adequate, but the film as a whole is too unevenly paced to achieve the sustained impetus its theme requires."

The Radio Times Guide to Films gave the film 2/5 stars, writing: "The ever-reliable team of Peter Cushing and Christopher Lee put a crisp British cast through its paces as mystified islanders are plagued by a winter heatwave caused by energy-starved aliens. Most of the action takes place at a local inn, where the helpless survivors get on each other's nerves. However, the final arrival of the monsters signals a few tepid thrills, even if they do resemble badly fried eggs with spaghetti innards. "

British film critic Leslie Halliwell said: "Sloppily made and over-prolonged science fiction with far too much irrelevant talk."
