= Simone Schwarz-Bart =

French writer (born 1938)

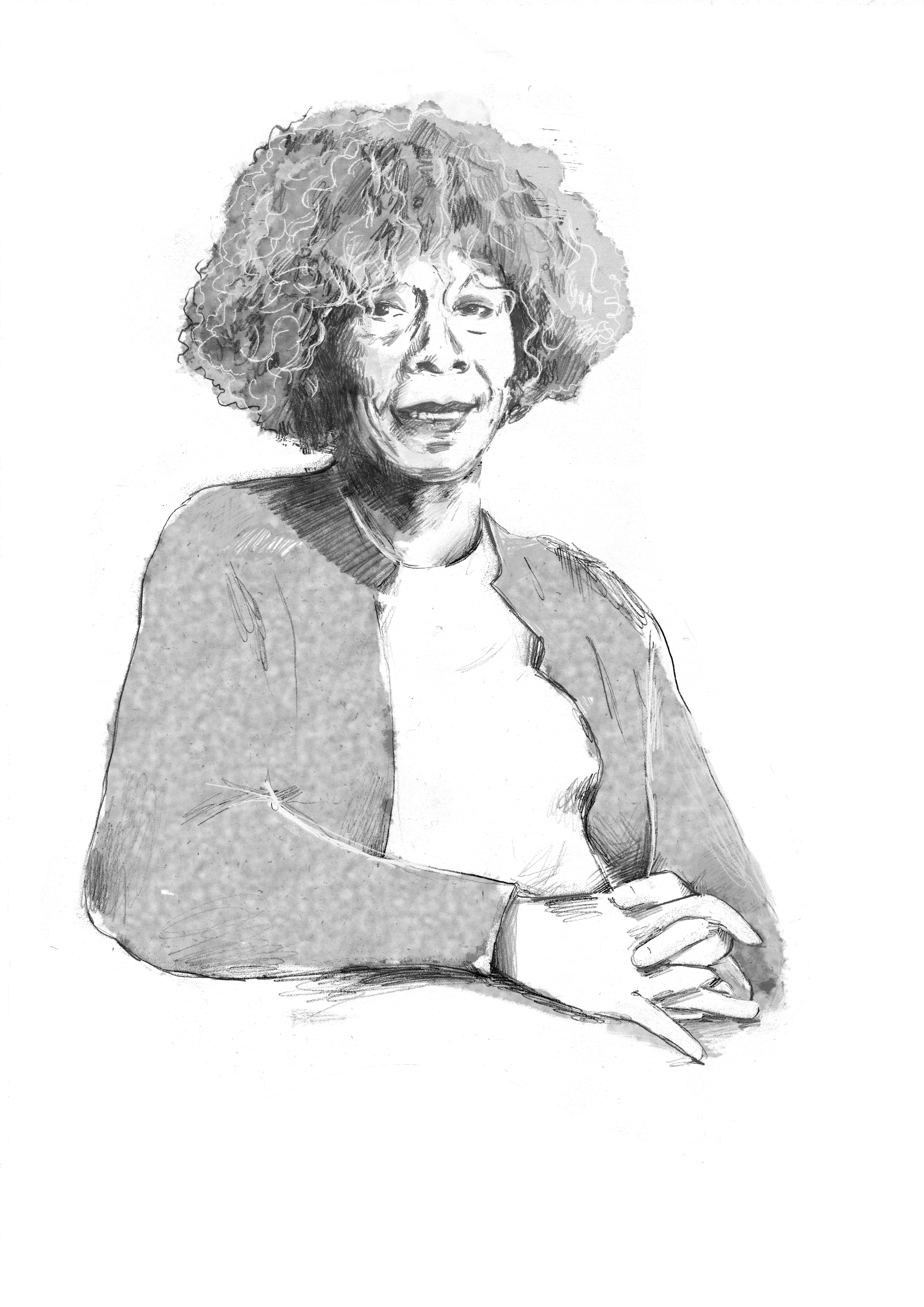
- Born: Simone Bruman; 1938 (age 87–88); Saintes, Charente-Maritime, France or Pointe-à-Pitre, Guadeloupe
- Spouse: André Schwarz-Bart
- Children: 2, including Jacques Schwarz-Bart
- Writing career
- Notable work: Pluie et vent sur Télumée Miracle
- Notable awards: Commandeur des Arts et des Lettres; Grand prix des lectrices de Elle; Prix Carbet de la Caraïbe et du Tout-Monde

Simone Schwarz-Bart (born Simone Brumant, 1938) is a French novelist and playwright of Guadeloupean origin. She is a recipient of the Grand prix des lectrices de Elle.

== Life ==
Simone Brumant was born in 1938 at Saintes in the Charente-Maritime department of France. Her place of birth is not clear, however, as she has also stated that she was born in Pointe-à-Pitre, Guadeloupe.

Her parents were originally from Guadeloupe. Her father was a soldier while her mother was a teacher. When the Second World War broke out, her father stayed in France to fight, while she and her mother returned to Guadeloupe. She lived in a rather dilapidated school group with her mother.

She studied at Pointe-à-Pitre, followed by Paris and Dakar.

At the age of 18, while studying in Paris, she met her future husband, André Schwarz-Bart, who encouraged her to take up writing as a career. They married in 1960, and lived at various times in Senegal, Switzerland, Paris, and Guadeloupe.

Schwarz-Bart at one time ran a Creole furniture business as well as a restaurant.

Her husband died in 2006. They have two sons, Jacques Schwarz-Bart, a noted jazz saxophonist, and Bernard Schwarz-Bart.

She currently lives in Goyave, a small town in Guadeloupe.

== Career ==
In 1967, together with her husband, André Schwarz-Bart, she wrote Un plat de porc aux bananes vertes, a historical novel exploring the parallels in the exiles of Caribbeans and Jews. In 1972, they published La Mulâtresse Solitude. In 1989, they wrote a six-volume encyclopaedia Hommage à la femme noire (In Praise of Black Women), to honour the black heroines who were missing in the official historiography.

Despite being mentioned as her husband's collaborator in their works, critics have often attributed full authorship to André Schwarz-Bart, and only his name appears in the French edition of La Mulâtresse Solitude. Her authorship is acknowledged, however, in the English translation of the book.

In 1972, Schwarz-Bart wrote Pluie et vent sur Télumée Miracle, which is considered one of the masterpieces of Caribbean literature. She wrote the book after the loss of a dear friend named Stéphanie whom she considered to be "her grandmother, her sister ..." For her "it was the country that went away with this person"

In 1979, she published Ti jean l'horizon.

Schwarz-Bart has also written for the theatre: Ton beau capitaine was a well-received play in one act.

=== Themes ===
Schwarz-Bart, along with her husband, is deeply committed to political issues, and the issues faced by people, especially women, of colour. She has explored the languages and locations of her ancestry in her works, and examines male domination over women in the Caribbean, as well as themes of alienation in exile.

=== Simone Schwarz-Bart and feminism ===
In her novel Pluie et vent sur Télumée Miracle, the aim is indeed to identify the process by which women become women. The famous sentence of Simone de Beauvoir, "we are not born a woman, we become it" will not have escaped you, but much more than a conceptual formula. Schwartz-Bart highlights this statement in her production by mentioning the genealogy of its literary staff. This evocation will constitute a database, understood like historical, in which is given to have elements characteristic of the West Indian woman. Schwarz-Bart attempts to rehabilitate female figures in the West Indian discourse by giving them a decisive place. She links to the heritage of feminism which is part of the West Indies reflection discourse which it projects as a social and historical reality which would legitimize the latter. The reintegration of women into the general historicity of the West Indies will enable the reader of Simone Schwarz-Bart to reposition women in the social relations of power, both subject to the colonial system and to that of compulsory "herocentrism". In this positioning, the woman shows herself to be humble, modest and courageous.

== Bibliography ==
=== Novels ===
- Un Plat de porc aux bananes vertes (with André Schwarz-Bart), Seuil, 1967
- Pluie et vent sur Télumée Miracle, Seuil, 1972 (The Bridge of Beyond, translated by Barbara Bray, New York Review Books Classics, 2013.), Grand prix des lectrices de Elle
- Ti Jean l'horizon, Seuil, 1979 (Between Two Worlds, translated by Barbara Bray, Heinemann, 1992.)

=== Theatre ===
- Ton Beau Capitaine, Seuil, 1987. (Your Handsome Captain, translated by Jessica Harris and Catherine Temerson, Callaloo 40 (Summer 1989).)

=== Non-fiction ===
- Hommage à la femme noire (with André Schwarz-Bart), Éditions Consulaires, 1989, 6 vol. (In Praise of Black Women, translated by Rose-Myriam Réjouis, Stephanie Daval and Val Vinokurov, University of Wisconsin Press, 2001–2004.)

== Awards and recognition ==
In 1973, Schwarz-Bart's Pluie et vent sur Télumée Miracle was awarded the Grand prix des lectrices de Elle. In 2006, Schwarz-Bart was awarded the rank of a Commander in the Ordre des Arts et des Lettres. In 2008, she received the Prix Carbet de la Caraïbe et du Tout-Monde (together with her husband, posthumously) for her lifetime of literary works.

== Relevant literature ==
- Mimko Bestman, Ajoke (August 31, 2017). ""A Woman is a Chestnut, a Man is a Breadfruit": Proverbs and Female Resilience in Simone Schwarz-Bart's The Bridge of Beyond". Proverbium: Yearbook of International Proverb Scholarship. 34 (1): 21–40.
