= Engines (book) =

1959 science history book by L. Sprague de Camp

- Cover of Engines
- Author: L. Sprague de Camp
- Illustrator: Jack Coggins
- Cover artist: Lowell Hess
- Language: English
- Subject: Engineering
- Publisher: Golden Press
- Publication date: 1959
- Publication place: United States
- Media type: Print (Hardback)
- Pages: 56 pp

Engines: Man's Use of Power, from the Water Wheel to the Atomic Pile is a science book for children by L. Sprague de Camp, illustrated by Jack Coggins, published by Golden Press as part of its Golden Library of Knowledge Series in 1959. A revised edition was issued in 1961, and a paperback edition in 1969. The book has been translated into Swedish, Norwegian, Finnish, Portuguese, and German.

== Summary ==
As stated on the cover, the work is a survey of "Man's use of power, from the water wheel to the atomic pile." The topic is covered in short segments, titled "The Age of Engines," "Putting Energy to Work," "The First Engines," "Water and Wind Engines," "Early Steam Engines," "How a Steam Engine Works", "Steam Turbines," "Internal-combustion engines," "Otto Cycle Engines," "Two-stroke Cycle Engines," "Diesel Engines," "Gas Turbines," "Rockets," "Electric Motors," "How an Electric Motor Works," "Electric Generators and Power Systems," "Atomic Engines," and "How a Reactor Works." There is a brief one-page topical index.

== Reception ==
The Science News-Letter, in its July 18, 1959 issue, listed the book among its "Books of the Week," describing the work as a "[f]actual book for young readers."
