= Ramón Armando Rodríguez =

Venezuelan writer, journalist and encyclopedist (1895–1959)

Ramón Armando Rodriguez Lugo (7 September 1895 – 16 April 1959) was a Venezuelan writer, journalist, and historian, best remembered as the author of the 1957 Diccionario biográfico, geográfico e histórico de Venezuela.

He was born in Cúa, Miranda, the son of Ramón Rodriguez Delgado Diaz and Rosa Lugo, he began publishing short stories and articles in the journal América de Puerto Cabello in 1920. That same year he published one of his best known poems, titled "Chrysalis". Ramón Rodríguez collaborated with magazines such as Élite (1925), La Esfera and El Heraldo. He worked in large companies such the Royal Bank of Canada (1925-1936), the Industrial Bank of Venezuela (1938-1945) and BAP (1946-1954). In 1942 he was involved in the foundation of the Colegio Nacional de Técnicos en Contabilidad (National Association of Accounting Technicians), and was appointed its president in 1947.

Over 20 years, Ramón Rodriguez wrote a major work, an encyclopedia entitled Diccionario biográfico, geográfico e histórico de Venezuela, a work that seeks to reflect the biographical, historical and geographical knowledge of Venezuela. It was first published in Madrid, in 1957. He died in Caracas.

== Bibliography ==
- Miramón, Alberto (1983). La llama que no muere. Instituto Panamericano de Geografía e Historia, Comisión de Historia, Comité Orígenes de la Emancipación.
- Quijada, Adolfo Salazar (1985). La Toponimia en Venezuela. Universidad Central de Venezuela, Facultad de Ciencias Económicas y Sociales, División de Publicaciones.
- Watson, Gayle Hudgens (1 January 1971). Colombia, Ecuador, and Venezuela: An Annotated Guide to Reference Materials in the Humanities and Social Sciences. Scarecrow Press. ISBN 978-0-8108-0433-3.
