= John Lymington =

English writer (1911–1983)

John Richard Newton Chance
- Born: 1911; Streatham Hill, London
- Died: 3 August 1983 (aged 71–72)
- Occupations: Novelist, writer, RAF pilot and instructor, publican
- Writing career
- Pen name: John Lymington, John Drummond, David C. Newton, Jonathan Chance
- Genres: Mystery fiction, science fiction, children's literature
- Notable work: Night of the Big Heat

John Richard Newton Chance (1911 – 3 August 1983), who wrote as John Lymington, was an English writer of short stories, children's literature, mystery, and science fiction novels. An obituary in Ansible credits Lymington with writing over 150 novels, 'including 20+ SF potboilers', adding that he 'made a steady income by delivering thrillers to Robert Hale (the publisher) at a chapter a week'.

== Early life ==
Chance was educated in a private school in London, and subsequently attended a technical college with the intention of becoming a civil engineer, an ambition which he left behind to become a quantity surveyor. By the age of 21, he decided to give up this job and began to work full-time as a writer.

== Military service ==
During Lymington's career with the Royal Air Force, which began in the summer of 1940, he became a flying instructor at South Cerney, Long Newnton and Bibury airfields in the Cotswolds. The three airfields were administrated under the Cerney office. In this role, he applied his experience of flying from as early as 1928. In November 1943, Chance was given indefinite leave, and was invalided out with the permanent rank of flight lieutenant on 8 February 1944. He wrote about this time in his autobiography, Yellow Belly, published by Robert Hale in 1959.

== Personal life ==
In 1943, Lymington met his wife-to-be, Shirley Savill, at the time serving as a section officer in the WAAF (Women's Auxiliary Air Force). They married on 22 July. After the war, they moved to Hampshire, where their three sons were born. The family moved to the Isle of Wight in 1956, to take up management of a pub.

== Bibliography ==
Lymington's first book, Wheels in the Forest, was written in 1935. Pseudonyms used by Lymington throughout his career included John Drummond, David C. Newton, Desmond Reid (see 'Sexton Blake') and Jonathan Chance. Brian Stableford suggested in the Historical Dictionary of Science Fiction Literature (pp. 208) that the name Lymington was chosen 'in a blatant attempt to cash in' on John Wyndham's popularity.

Whilst certain of Lymington's adult novels enjoyed wide success and translation, he is also fondly remembered for the 'Bunst' children's series, starring eccentric inventor Audacious Cotterell and his youthful sidekick, Bunst (a contraction of his nickname, Bunstuffer).

=== The 'Bunst' books ===
Certain bibliographies include only the latter four of these as 'Bunst' books; however, all six involve the same principal characters.

- The Black Ghost (1947) (writing as David C Newton)
- The Dangerous Road (1948) (writing as David C Newton)
- Bunst and the Brown Voice (1950) (writing as John Newton Chance)
- Bunst the Bold (1950)
- Bunst and the Secret Six (1951)
- Bunst and the Flying Eye (1953)

=== Sci-fi / Fantasy ===
Several of Lymington's short stories were collected in The Night Spiders in 1964. Night of the Big Heat (1959) is probably his most well-known title, due to its 1967 film adaptation.

- Night of the Big Heat (1959)
- The Giant Stumbles (1960)
- The Grey Ones (1960)
- The Coming of Strangers (1961)
- A Sword Above the Night (1962)
- The Screaming Face (1963)
- The Sleep Eaters (1963)
- Froomb! (1964)
- The Star Witches (1965)
- The Green Drift (1965)
- The Waking of the Stone (1967)
- Ten Million Years to Friday (1967)
- The Light Benders (1968) (writing as Jonathan Chance)
- The Nowhere Place (1969)
- Give Daddy the Knife, Darling (1969)
- The Year Dot (1972)
- The Hole in the World (1974)
- A Spider in the Bath (1975)
- The Laxham Haunting (1976)
- Starseed on Eye Moor (1977)
- A Caller from Overspace (1979)
- Voyage of the Eighth Mind (1980)
- The Power Ball (1981)
- The Terror Version (1982)
- The Vale of Sad Banana (1984)

=== Wartime ===
Writing as John Drummond, in The Thriller Library (Amalgamated Press), a "short-lived title from the mid-1930s, running only 24 issues between July 1934 and June 1935".

- Eight Came Back [Red Sword], (18 May 1940)
- Gestapo Spy Trap [Red Sword], (9 March 1940)
- One Man Air Raid [Red Sword], (6 April 1940)
- The Prisoner Dies at Dawn [Red Sword], (23 March 1940)
- Scourge of the Nazis [Red Sword], (20 April 1940)
- Spy Bait [Red Sword], (4 May 1940)

=== Sexton Blake ===
As John Drummond, he wrote a number of additions to the Sexton Blake series: . Note that 'Desmond Reid' appears to have been used as a catch-all pseudonym for this series, so it is possible that certain pieces credited to this name actually originated with him. This list includes only those pieces credited to John Drummond.

- The Essex Road Crime (May 1944), 3rd Series, Issue 71 (illustrated by Eric Parker)
- The Manor House Menace (Jul 1944), 3rd series, Issue 75 (illustrated by Eric Parker)
- The Tragic Case of the Station-Master's Legacy (Sep 1944), 3rd series, Issue 80 (illustrator unknown)
- The Riddle of the Leather Bottle (Oct 1944), 3rd series, Issue 82 (illustrator unknown)
- The Painted Dagger (Dec 1944), 3rd series, Issue 86 (illustrated by Eric Parker)
- The House on the Hill (Mar 1945), 3rd series, Issue 91 (illustrated by Eric Parker)
- At Sixty Miles per Hour (Apr 1945), 3rd series, Issue 94 (illustrator unknown)
- The Riddle of the Mummy Case (Jul 1945), 3rd series, Issue 100 (illustrated by Eric Parker)

=== Crime/Thriller ===
As John Newton Chance:

- Wheels in the Forest. (London, Gollancz, 1935).
- Murder in Oils. (London, Gollancz, 1935).
- The Devil Drives. (London, Gollancz, 1936).
- Rhapsody in Fear. (London, Gollancz, 1937).
- Maiden Possessed. (London, Gollancz, 1937).
- Death of an Innocent. (London, Gollancz, 1938).
- The Devil in Greenlands. (London, Gollancz, 1939).
- The Ghost of Truth. (London, Gollancz, 1939).
- Screaming Fog. (London, Macdonald, 1944). (U.S. Title Death Stalks the Cobbled Square)
- The Red Knight. (London, Macdonald, 1945).
- Eye in Darkness. (London, Macdonald, 1946).
- The Knight and the Castle. (London, Macdonald, 1947).
- The Black Highway. (London, Macdonald, 1947).
- Coven Gibbet. (London, Macdonald, 1948).
- The Brandy Pole. (London, Macdonald, 1949).
- Night of the Full Moon. (London, Macdonald, 1950).
- Aunt Miranda's Murder. (London, Macdonald, 1951).
- The 'Twopenny Box. (London, Macdonald, 1952).
- The Man in My Shoes. (London, Macdonald, 1952).
- The Jason Affair. (London, Macdonald, 1953).
- The Randy Inheritance. (London, Macdonald, 1953).
- Jason and the Sleep Game. (London, Macdonald, 1954).
- The Jason Murders. (London, Macdonald, 1954).
- Jason Goes West. (London, Macdonald, 1955).
- A Shadow Called Jason. (London, Macdonald, 1956).
- The Last Seven Hours. (London, Macdonald, 1956).
- Dead Man's Knock. (London, Hale, 1957).
- The Little Crime. (London, Hale, 1957).
- Affair with a Rich Girl. (London, Hale, 1958).
- Man With Three Witches. (London, Hale, 1958).
- Fatal Fascination. (London, Hale, 1959).
- The Man With No Face. (London, Hale, 1959).
- Alarm at Black Brake. (London, Hale, 1960).
- Lady in a Frame. (London, Hale, 1960).
- Import of Evil. (London, Hale, 1961).
- Night of the Settlement. (London, Hale, 1961).
- Triangle of Fear. (London, Hale, 1962).
- The Forest Affair. (London, Hale, 1963).
- The Man Behind Me. (London, Hale, 1963).
- Commission for Disaster. (London, Hale, 1964).
- Death Under Desolate. (London, Hale, 1964).
- Stormlight. (London, Hale, 1965).
- The Affair at Dead End. (London, Hale, 1966).
- The Double Death. (London, Hale, 1966).
- The Mask of Pursuit. (London, Hale, 1967).
- The Thug Executive. (London, Hale, 1967).
- The Case of the Death Computer. (London, Hale, 1967).
- The Death Women. (London, Hale, 1967).
- The Case of the Fear Makers. (London, Hale, 1967).
- The Hurricane Drift. (London, Hale, 1967).
- Mantrap. (London, Hale, 1968).
- Dead Men's Shoes. (London, Hale, 1968).
- The Halloween Murders. (London, Hale, 1968).
- The Light Benders. (London, Hale, 1968).
- The Fate of the Lying Jade. (1968).
- Death of the Wild Bird (London, Hale, 1968).
- The Rogue Aunt. (London, Hale, 1969).
- The Abel Coincidence. (London, Hale, 1969).
- The Ice Maidens. (London, Hale, 1969).
- Involvement in Austria. (London, Hale, 1969)
- The Killer Reaction. (London, Hale, 1969).
- The Mirror Train. (London, Hale, 1970).
- Three Masks of Death. (London, Hale, 1970).
- A Ring of Liars. (London, Hale, 1970).
- The Mists of Treason. (London, Hale, 1970).
- The Faces of a Bad Girl. (London, Hale, 1971).
- The Cat Watchers. (London, Hale, 1971).
- A Wreath of Bones. (London, Hale, 1971).
- Last Train to Limbo. (London, Hale, 1972).
- The Dead Tale-Tellers. (London, Hale, 1972).
- The Man with Two Heads. (London, Hale, 1972)
- Bad Dream of Death. (London, Hale, 1972).
- The Grab Operators. (London, Hale, 1973).
- The Love-hate Relation. (London, Hale, 1973).
- The Farm Villains (London, Hale, 1973)
- The Starfish Affair. (London, Hale, 1974).
- The Girl in the Crime Belt. (London, Hale, 1974).
- The Canterbury Killgrims (London, Hale, 1974).
- The Shadow of the Killer (London, Hale, 1974).
- The Devil's Edge. (London, Hale, 1975).
- Hill Fog. (London, Hale, 1975).
- The Monstrous Regiment. (London, Hale, 1975).
- Return to Death Valley. (London, Hale, 1976).
- The Murder Makers. (London, Hale, 1976).
- A Fall-Out of Thieves. (London, Hale, 1976).
- The Frightened Fisherman. (London, Hale, 1977).
- The House of the Dead Ones. (London, Hale, 1977).
- Motive for a Kill. (London, Hale, 1977).
- The Ducrow Folly. (London, Hale, 1977).
- A Drop of Hot Gold. (London, Hale, 1978).
- End of an Iron Man. (London, Hale, 1978).
- Thieves' Kitchen. (London, Hale, 1979).
- The Guilty Witness. (London, Hale, 1979).
- Death Watch Ladies. (London, Hale, 1980).
- A Place Called Skull. (London, Hale, 1980).
- The Mayhem Madchen. (London, Hale, 1980).
- The Black Widow. (London, Hale, 1981).
- The Mystery of Enda Favell. (London, Hale, 1981).
- The Death Importer (London, Hale, 1981).
- The Hunting of Mr. Exe. (London, Hale, 1982).
- The Shadow in Pursuit. (London, Hale, 1982).
- Madman's Will. (London, Hale, 1982).
- The Death Chemist. (London, Hale, 1983).
- Terror Train. (London, Hale, 1983).
- The Traditional Murders. (London, Hale, 1983)
- Nobody's Supposed to Murder the Butler. (London, Hale, 1984).
- Looking for Samson. (London, Hale, 1984).
- The Bad Circle. (London, Hale, 1985).
- The Time-Bomb. (London, Hale, 1985).
- Spy on a Spider. (London, Hale, 1987).
- The Hiller Weapon. (London, Hale, 1987).
- The Hit Man. (London, Hale, 1987).
- The Smiling Cadaver. (London, Hale, 1987).
- Spy on Spider. (London, Hale, 1987).
- Man on the Cliff. (London, Hale, 1988).
- The Shadow Before. (London, Hale, 1988).
- A Confusion of Eyes. (London, Hale, 1988).
- The Reluctant Agent. (London, Hale, 1988).
- The Offshore Conspiracy. (London, Hale, 1988).
- The Running of the Spies. (London, Hale, 1989).
- A Tale of Tangled Ladies. (London, Hale, 1989).

== Television / film adaptations ==
Night of the Big Heat was adapted twice. The first, a 1960 TV version set on Salisbury Plain, was directed by Cyril Coke and adapted from the book by Giles Cooper. The second was a 94-minute feature film set on a remote island off the English coast; made by Planet Films, it was directed by Terence Fisher and starred Patrick Allen, Christopher Lee and Peter Cushing.

Lymington's 1956 crime novel The Last Seven Hours was filmed as Crosstrap in 1962.
