= André Schwarz-Bart =

French writer (1928–2006)

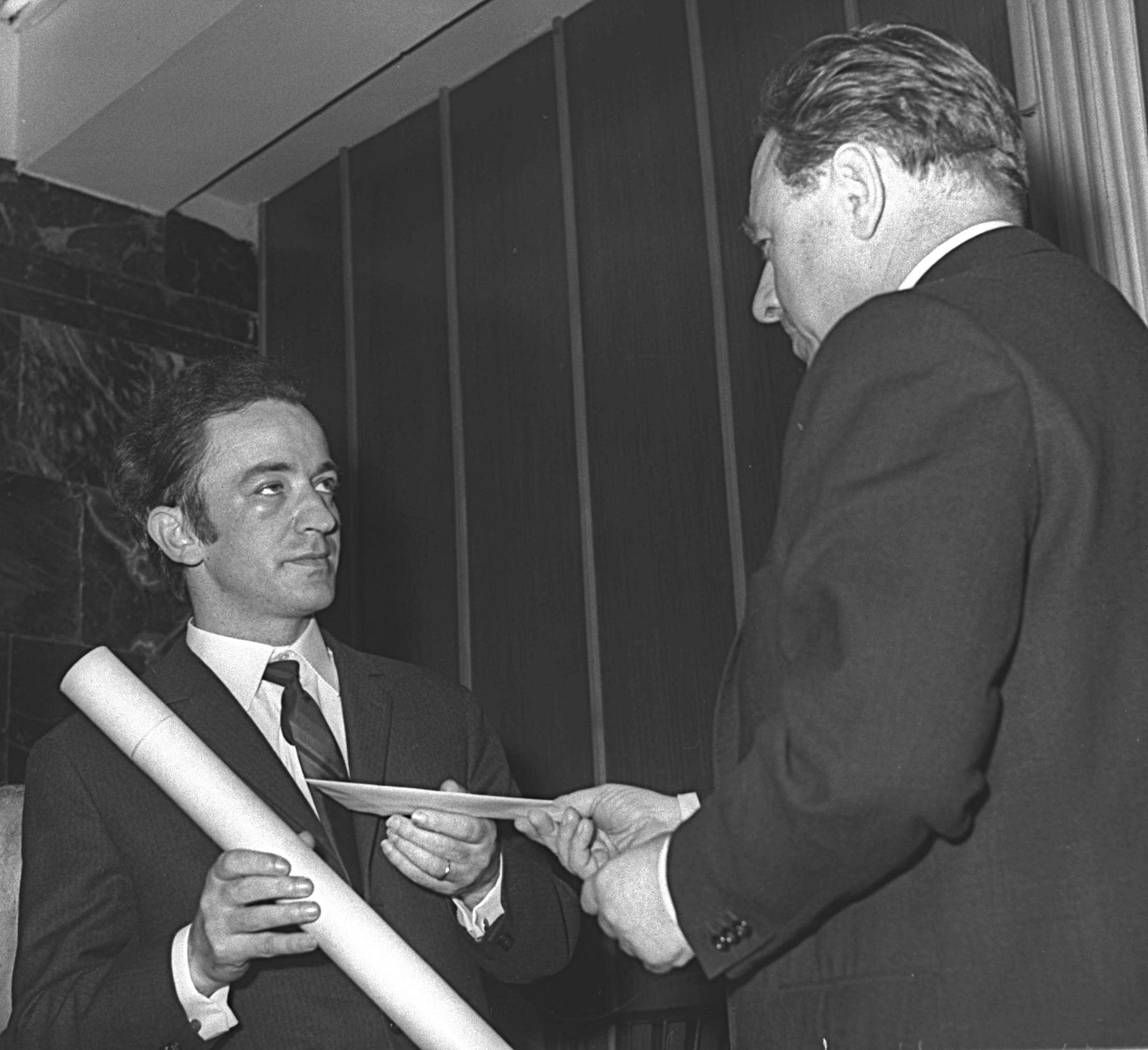
- André Schwarz-Bart receiving the Jerusalem Prize (1967)
- Born: André Schwarz-Bart; 23 May 1928; Metz, Moselle, France
- Died: 30 September 2006 (aged 78); Pointe-à-Pitre, Guadeloupe, France
- Occupation: Novelist
- Notable work: The Last of the Just

André Schwarz-Bart (May 23, 1928 – September 30, 2006) was a French novelist of Polish-Jewish ancestry. He was awarded the Prix Goncourt for his debut novel in 1959, and the 1967 Jerusalem Prize.

== Biography ==
Schwarz-Bart's parents moved to France in 1924, a few years before he was born in Metz. His first language was Yiddish and he learned to speak French on the street and in public school.

In 1941, after the fall of France and occupation by Nazi troops, his parents were deported to Auschwitz. Soon after, Schwarz-Bart, still a young teen, joined the Resistance. His experiences as a Jew during the war later prompted him to write his debut work, Les derniers des justes (1959), published in English in 1960 as Last of the Just. It chronicled Jewish history through the eyes of a wounded survivor and won the Prix Goncourt.

He spent his final years in Guadeloupe, with his wife, the novelist Simone Schwarz-Bart. Her parents were natives of the island.

The two co-wrote the book Un plat de porc aux bananes vertes (1967). Some critics have suggested that his wife collaborated with him on A Woman Named Solitude. The two were awarded the Prix Carbet de la Caraïbe et du Tout-Monde in 2008 for their lifetime of literary work.

He is best known for his novel Le Dernier des justes (translated into English as The Last of the Just). The book, which traces the story of a Jewish family from the time of the Crusades to the gas chambers of Auschwitz, earned Schwarz-Bart the Prix Goncourt in 1959. He won the Jerusalem Prize in 1967.

He died of complications after heart surgery in 2006.

One of his two sons with his wife Simone Schwarz-Bart is Jacques Schwarz-Bart, a noted jazz saxophonist.

== Bibliography ==
- (1959) Le Dernier des Justes; published in English translation as The Last of the Just (1960)
- (1967) Un plat de porc aux bananes vertes, with Simone Schwarz-Bart. This work has not been published in English. A literal translation of the title would be "A plate of pork with green bananas".
- (1972) La Mulâtresse Solitude (novel); published in English as A Woman Named Solitude (1973)
- (1989) Hommage à la femme noire in collaboration with Simone Schwarz-Bart; published in English as In Praise of Black Women (2001)
- (2009) L'étoile du matin; published in English as The Morning Star (2011)
