= Night of the Big Heat =

1959 novel by John Lymington

- First edition
- Author: John Lymington
- Cover artist: Peter Rudland
- Language: English
- Genre: Science fiction
- Publisher: Hodder & Stoughton
- Publication date: 1 January 1959
- Publication place: United Kingdom
- Media type: Print (Hardback)
- Pages: 160 (first edition hardback)

Night of the Big Heat is a science fiction novel written in 1959 by John Lymington. It tells the story of a British island that is experiencing a bizarre and stifling heatwave. Although the island is unnamed it is described as being close to the mainland, and the town of Yarmouth is mentioned, both of which imply the story is set on the Isle of Wight.

== Plot summary ==
The main characters are Richard Callum, a novelist, and his wife Frankie, who own a pub called the White Lion. Richard hires a secretary, Patricia Wells, to assist with his new book, but she becomes obsessed with him. Ultimately, a visiting scientist named Harsen reveals that the extreme heat is caused by an alien race of spiders that are "beaming in" scouts from their home planet using a radio wave ray, which generates intense heat as a side effect.

The spiders themselves are carnivorous and eat humans, and give off bodily heat intense enough to burn alive any person who gets too close to them. Together with Harsen, Patricia, and science fiction author Vernon Stone, the Callums try to make it to the island's radio station to call for help so that they can thwart the invasion.

== Screen adaptations ==
A television adaptation was broadcast by ITV in the Play of the Week series on 14 June 1960, scripted by Giles Cooper, and directed by Cyril Coke. It starred Lee Montague as Richard Callum, Sally Bazely as Frankie Callum, Melissa Stribling as Patricia Wells, Karel Štěpánek as Doctor Harsen, and Bernard Archard as Sir James Murray. Bernard Cribbins also featured in a small role. Made by Associated Rediffusion, it no longer exists.

The novel was later adapted into a 1967 film, Night of the Big Heat (also known as Island of the Burning Damned) by Planet Film Productions, starring Christopher Lee, Peter Cushing, Patrick Allen, Sarah Lawson, Jane Merrow, and Kenneth Cope. It was directed by Terence Fisher.
