= The Armada (book) =

1950 book by Garrett Mattingly

- First edition
- Author: Garrett Mattingly
- Publisher: Houghton Mifflin Company
- Publication date: 1950

The Armada is a popular history book by Garrett Mattingly—a historian who taught at Columbia University—about the attempt of the Spanish Armada to invade England in 1588. It was published in 1959 by Houghton Mifflin Company, and Mattingly won a special Pulitzer Prize for the work in 1960 as "a first class history and a literary work of high order." It was published in the UK in the same year by Jonathan Cape under the title The Defeat of the Spanish Armada.

One biographer wrote that The Armada was "written in purple prose but a royal purple, which read like historical fiction." Another biographer noted that Mattingly "treated his job as that of telling a story about people" and that The Armada was "that rarity, a book by a professional historian and admired by professional historians which nevertheless became a bestseller." The Armada remains in print and has also been issued outside the United States under the title The Defeat of the Spanish Armada.
