= Jonathan Freedland =

British journalist (born 1967)

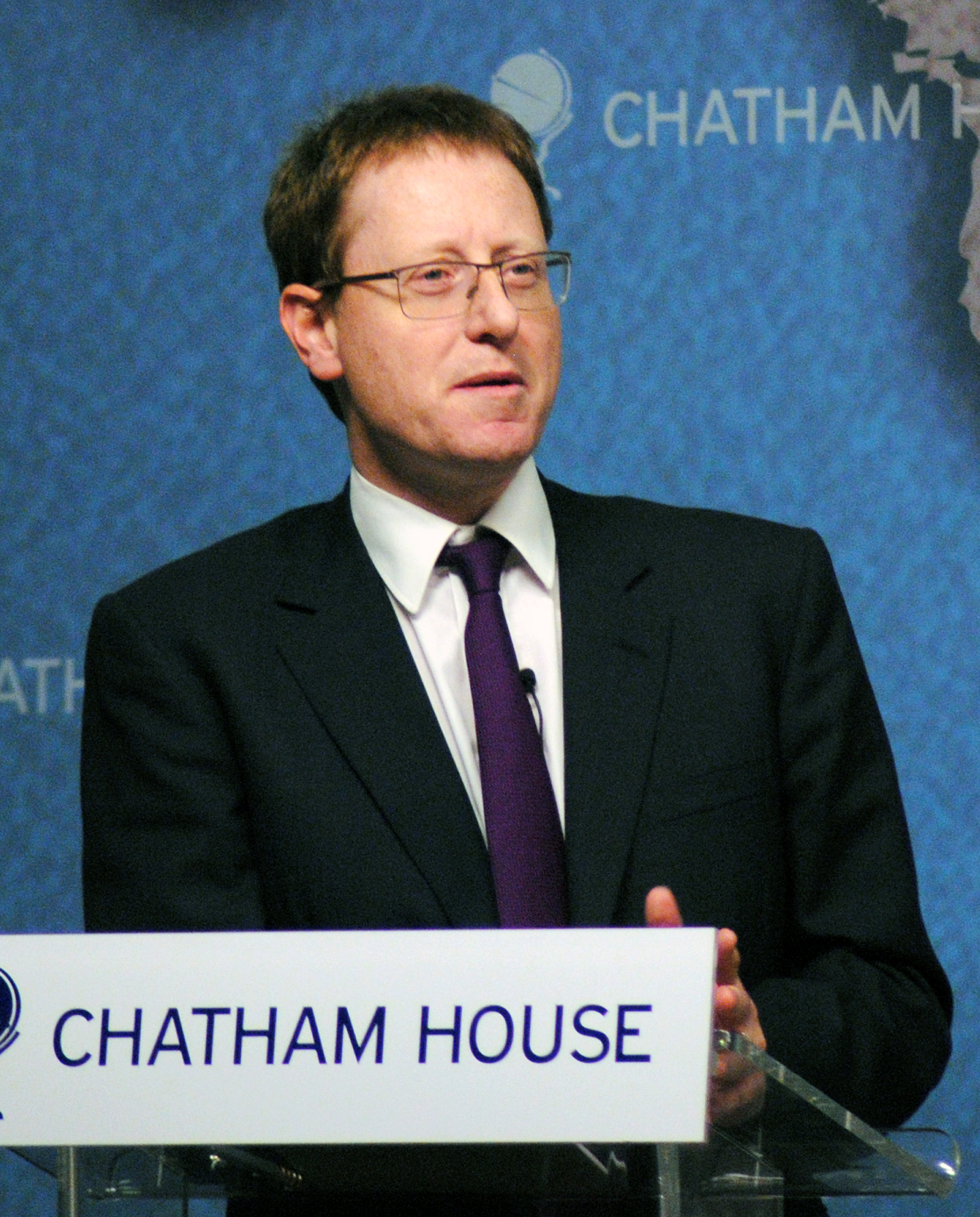
- Freedland in 2013
- Born: 25 February 1967 (age 59)
- Other name: Sam Bourne
- Education: Wadham College, Oxford
- Occupation: Journalist
- Spouse: Sarah Peters
- Children: 2
- Website: jonathanfreedland.com twitter.com/freedland theguardian.com/profile/jonathanfreedland

Jonathan Saul Freedland (born 25 February 1967) is a British journalist who writes a weekly column for The Guardian and presents the BBC Radio 4 contemporary history series The Long View. He previously wrote for The Jewish Chronicle, until his resignation in September 2024 along with Hadley Freeman, David Aaronovitch, David Baddiel and others. Freedland also writes thrillers, mainly under the pseudonym Sam Bourne, and has written a play, Jews. In Their Own Words, performed in 2022 at the Royal Court Theatre, London.

== Early life and education ==
Jonathan Saul Freedland was born on 25 February 1967, the youngest of three children and the only son of a Jewish couple, biographer and journalist Michael Freedland, and Israeli-born Sara Hocherman.

He was educated at University College School, a boys' independent school in Hampstead, London. As a child, Freedland periodically accompanied his father for broadcasting work. On one occasion, his father was interviewing Eric Morecambe, who comically assumed the 10 year-old Freedland was married.

He spent a gap year working on a kibbutz in Israel with the Labour Zionist Habonim Dror where Freedland had been mentored by Mark Regev, and Freedland was in turn, a mentor to Sacha Baron Cohen.)

=== Children ===
Jacob Freedland , Sam Freedland

== Journalism ==
Freedland began his Fleet Street career at the short-lived Sunday Correspondent. In 1990 he joined the BBC as a news reporter across radio and television, including for The World at One and Today on Radio 4. In 1992, he was awarded the Laurence Stern fellowship on The Washington Post, serving as a staff writer on national news. He was Washington Correspondent for The Guardian from 1993 until 1997, when he returned to London as an editorial writer and columnist.

Between 2002 and 2004, Freedland was an occasional columnist for the Daily Mirror and from 2005 to 2007 he wrote a weekly column for the London Evening Standard. He wrote a monthly column for The Jewish Chronicle, until ceasing in September 2024 following its publication of news reports said to have been fabricated.

Freedland was named "Columnist of the Year" in the 2002 What the Papers Say awards and in 2008 was awarded the David Watt Prize for Journalism, in recognition of his essay "Bush's Amazing Achievement", published in The New York Review of Books. Nominated on seven occasions, Freedland was awarded a special Orwell Prize in May 2014 for his journalism. In 2016, he won the "Commentariat of the Year" prize at the Comment Awards.

Freedland was executive editor of the opinion section of The Guardian from May 2014 till early 2016 and continues to write a Saturday column for it.

In November 2019, Freedland apologised for making a "very bad error" in falsely reporting that a shortlisted Labour prospective parliamentary candidate had been fined for making antisemitic remarks on Facebook. He attributed the mistaken identification by confusing two lawyers with the same name to a "previously reliable Labour source" whose information he had "passed on too hastily".

== Author ==
Freedland has published twelve books: three non-fiction works under his own name and nine novels, eight of them under the pseudonym Sam Bourne.

His first book, Bring Home the Revolution: The case for a British Republic, was published in 1998.

Jacob's Gift (2005) is a memoir recounting the lives of three generations of his own Jewish family as well as exploring wider questions of identity and belonging. In 2008, he broadcast a two-part series for BBC Radio 4 – British Jews and the Dream of Zion – as well as the BBC Four TV documentary How to be a Good President.

The Righteous Men was published under the Bourne pen name in 2006.

The book was followed by another Sam Bourne title, The Last Testament (2007), set against the backdrop of the Middle East peace process. It draws on the author's experiences in that region as a reporter for over twenty years, and a Guardian newspaper sponsored dialogue which was influential in the 2003 Geneva Accords. The central character finds herself involved in a mix of the modern political situation and ancient revelations. The Final Reckoning (2008), was based on the true story of the Avengers: a group of Holocaust survivors who sought revenge against their Nazi persecutors, and just missed the peak of The Sunday Times best-seller list. Just before The Chosen One (2010), the fourth thriller by Sam Bourne was published in the UK, The Bookseller reported in April 2010 that HarperCollins had signed Freedland for three more Bourne books.

HarperCollins published Pantheon in July 2012. Freedland's sixth novel entitled The 3rd Woman, published by HarperCollins in 2015 under his own name. His sixth Bourne novel, To Kill a President, was published by HarperCollins on 4 July 2017. The seventh novel under the Sam Bourne pseudonym, To Kill the Truth, was published in February 2019, and the eighth To Kill a Man, came out in March 2020.

He is the author of The Escape Artist: The Man Who Broke Out of Auschwitz to Warn the World, a biography of Rudolf Vrba, who participated in the first escape by Jews from the Auschwitz concentration camp. It reached number two in the Sunday Times bestsellers list and was shortlisted for the Baillie Gifford Prize of 2022, the Rathbones Folio Prize, and the Waterstones Book of the Year. In the US it won the National Jewish Book Award in both the Biography and Holocaust categories.

Freedland is also the writer of a stage play Jews. In Their Own Words. performed at the Royal Court Theatre and directed by Vicky Featherstone in 2022.

In 2024, Freedland wrote a children's book titled King Winter's Birthday, which was inspired by an unpublished children's short story by fellow Jewish writer Ulrich Alexander Boschwitz. Boschwitz left behind the manuscript of King Winter's Birthday: A Fairy Tale, dreaming of the plot while held on the Isle of Man; the unpublished handwritten work, along with illustrations by Ulrich's mother, had lain undisturbed in a New York archive for eighty years. British publisher Pushkin Press discovered Boschwitz's story and commissioned Freedland to translate it into English. On 14 November 2024 Pushkin Press published Freedland's translation of Boschwitz's manuscript as King Winter's Birthday, with illustrations by British artist Emily Sutton.

== Views ==
=== Israel, Zionism, and antisemitism ===
A leading liberal Zionist in the UK, he wrote in 2012 that he uses the word Zionism infrequently, as the word has been misunderstood and has become defined as right-wing. On the 2014 Israel–Gaza conflict, he believed that military action perpetuates conflict and called for negotiations to end the cycles of violence. He defends Israel's right to exist, but hopes that Israel will recognise the "high price" paid by Palestinians.

Freedland has urged the British left to treat Jews "the same way you'd treat any other minority". While Jeremy Corbyn was its leader, Freedland accused the Labour Party of being in denial on the issue of internal antisemitism. He also commented on the antisemitic expressions of Palestinians with whom Corbyn associated and expressed the view that many of the Labour Party's new members were hostile to Jews. Freedland's Labour antisemitism scoop was criticised for demonising dissent. Freedland approved of efforts made by Corbyn's successor, Keir Starmer, to tackle the party's issues with antisemitism.

Beginning in 2021, Freedland has cohosted a Podcast called "Unholy: Two Jews on the News" with Israeli news anchor and journalist Yonit Levi.

Freedland is a supporter of projects that seek to preserve Jewish identity and heritage. He has frequently written about the importance of both his faith and his cultural heritage.

== Personal life ==
Freedland married Sarah Peters, a radio and podcast producer. They have two sons, and conform to Masorti Judaism.

As of 2022 Freedland is a governor of Simon Marks Jewish Primary School in Stamford Hill.

== Bibliography ==
=== Books ===
==== Non-fiction ====
- Bring Home the Revolution: The Case for a British Republic (Fourth Estate, 1998) ISBN 978-0007291519
- Jacob's Gift: A Journey into the Heart of Belonging (Hamish Hamilton, 2005), ISBN 978-0241142431
- The Escape Artist: The Man Who Broke Out of Auschwitz to Warn the World (John Murray, 2022) ISBN 978-1529369045
- The Traitors Circle: The True Story of a Secret Resistance Network in Nazi Germany—and the Spy Who Betrayed Them (Harper, 2025) ISBN 978-0063373204

==== Fiction ====
- The Righteous Men (HarperCollins, 2006) ISBN 978-0061138294
- The Last Testament, published elsewhere as The Jerusalem Secret (HarperCollins, 2007) ISBN 978-0-00-720333-8
- The Final Reckoning (HarperCollins, 2008) ISBN 978-0-00-726649-4
- The Chosen One (HarperCollins, 2010) ISBN 978-0007342600
- Pantheon (HarperCollins, 5 July 2012) ISBN 978-0007413645
- The 3rd Woman (Harper 4 August 2015) ISBN 978-0062207555 (first published as by J. Freedland, not Sam Bourne)
- To Kill the President (HarperCollins, 12 June 2017) ISBN 978-0007413720
- To Kill the Truth (Quercus, 21 February 2019) ISBN 978-1787474895
- To Kill a Man (Quercus, 19 March 2020) ISBN 978-1787474956
- King Winter's Birthday (Pushkin Press, 14 November 2024) ISBN 978-1782694670

=== Articles ===
- "Trump's Chaver in Jerusalem" (review of Anshel Pfeffer, Bibi: The Turbulent Life and Times of Benjamin Netanyahu, Basic Books, 2018), New York Review of Books, vol. LXV, no 13 (16 August 2018), pp. 32–34.
- "A Feigned Reluctance" (review of Rory Stewart, How Not to Be a Politician, Penguin Press, 2024, 454 pp.), The New York Review of Books, vol. LXXI, no. 19 (5 December 2024), pp. 26–28.
