= History of the Jews in Skarżysko-Kamienna =

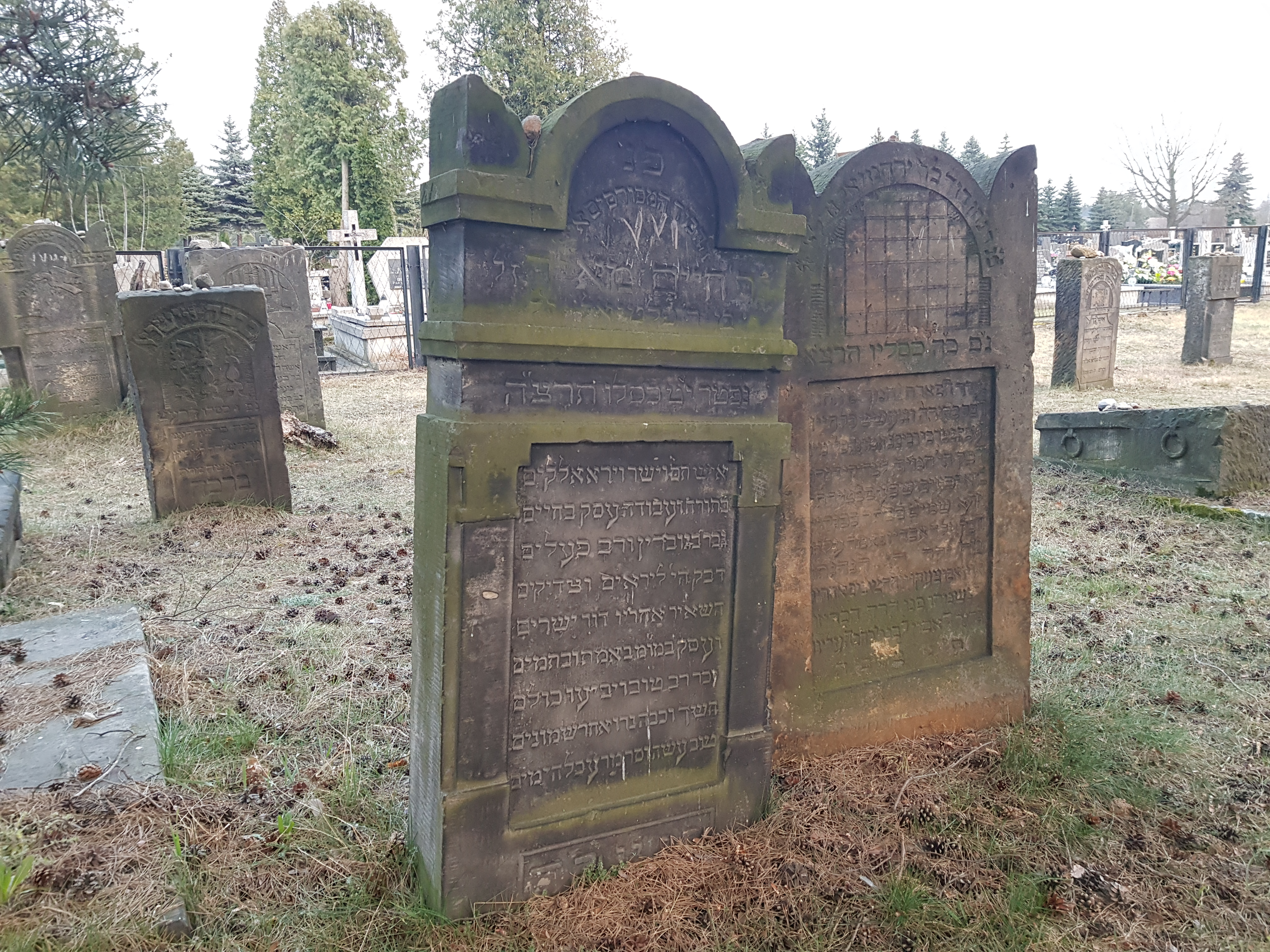
Preserved old gravestones at the Jewish cemetery

Development of the Jewish community in Skarżysko-Kamienna is connected to the establishment of the Ivangorod-Dombrovo Railway in 1885. A few years later, the community built its first synagogue and established a cemetery. By 1921, at the dawn of the Second Polish Republic, one in five residents of the settlement practiced Judaism, although only 11.6% of the population declared Jewish nationality.

Due to restrictions tied to military secrecy, Jewish residents were excluded from employment in the rapidly growing arms industry. (Note: In 1931, 3,071 residents of Skarżysko-Kamienna were employed in industry (making up 49.9% of the workforce), while in 1939, this number rose to 5,728 (an increase of 86.5%; 53.9% of all employed) (Wojewoda (2013, p. 214)).) Consequently, many established small businesses and dominated sectors like mercery and craft. Notable figures included Mendel Feldman, who leased iron foundries employing over 430 workers, and his successors, who owned the Praca Enamelware Factory, staffed by around 150 laborers.

After the German invasion of Poland in September 1939, the Jewish population of Skarżysko-Kamienna suffered under brutal occupation. Persecution included murders, assaults, and forced labor. Between 1941 and 1942, approximately 3,000 Jews were confined in a ghetto, which was eventually liquidated. Inhabitants were either shot on site or deported to the Treblinka extermination camp.

The forced labor camp at the HASAG factory became an emblem of Nazi atrocities. This camp housed not only local Jews but also those from other parts of the Radom District and concentration camps. Historians estimate that between 25,000 and 30,000 individuals passed through the camp, with 18,000 to 23,000 of them perishing.

Some Poles risked their lives to assist persecuted Jews. Those caught providing aid often paid the ultimate price, executed for their acts of humanity.

== Up to 1918 ==
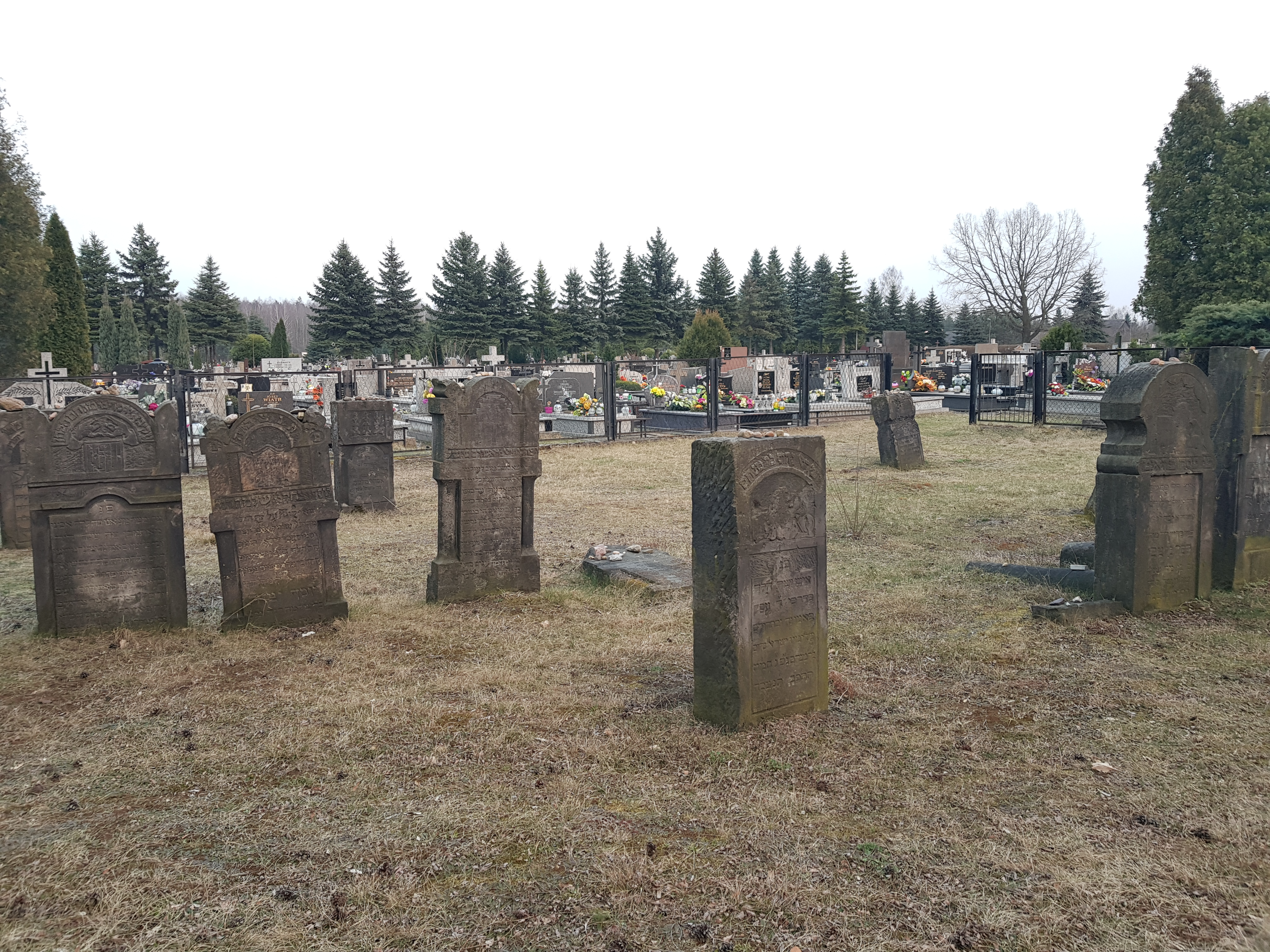
Jewish cemetery in Skarżysko-Kamienna

The first Jews settled along the Kamienna river, in the area of present-day Skarżysko-Kamienna, in the 18th century. According to the 1787 population census of the Archdiocese of Kraków, there were 174 people living in the settlement of Kamienna, including 12 of Jewish origin (6.9%). Rejów, on the other hand, had 114 residents, six of whom were Jews (5.3%). The largest settlement in the analyzed area, Skarżysko Książęce, had the fewest Jewish residents, with only four (1.75%) in the final years of the Polish–Lithuanian Commonwealth (a total of 228 residents). (Note: Szmul (Szulim) Leo Gelblum (c. 1862–1926), son of Joska and Fajga-Łaja, became the first rabbi of Kamienna after the establishment of the synagogue district in the settlement in 1911. He was married to Chana Rachela, and they had a daughter, Rajzla (Zemeła (2008, pp. 81–82)).) A larger influx of Jews occurred only after 1885, when the Kamienna settlement became an important railway junction of the Ivangorod-Dombrovo Railway. In 1891, the first synagogue, mikveh, and cheder were built, and at the turn of the 19th and 20th centuries, a cemetery was established. In 1911, a Jewish district was created in Kamienna, and its first rabbi was Szmul Leo Gelblum. Two years earlier, in 1909, the inactive Iron and Steel Works "Skarżysko" in Kamienna was leased by Mendel Feldman, who began production. In the first half of 1914, the production reached 90,000 poods (about 1,490 tons), and 200 workers were employed.

In 1915, the Jewish residents of the settlement built a brick and stone synagogue. Next to the large prayer hall, there was a vestibule with an attic. The religious services were overseen by Rabbi Szmul Leo Gelblum. During World War I, the difficult economic situation, caused by the Austrian occupation administration, led to the creation of a Relief Committee by the Poles, which focused primarily on collecting food. Mendel Feldman, a Jew, was part of the committee but was unable to pass any resolutions beneficial to the Jewish population. The local qahal was advised to establish its own committee.

== Second Polish Republic (1918–1939) ==
=== Population ===
During the period of the Second Polish Republic, the demographic situation in the city was specific. In urban centers of the Kielce Voivodeship, Jews often dominated. (Note: In the 1938 publication Obraz Polski dzisiejszej. Fakty, cyfry i tablice (The Image of Contemporary Poland: Facts, Figures, and Tables), a list of 35 small towns where Jews predominated was published. Eight of these towns (22.9%) were located in the Kielce Voivodeship. The Jewish community was the majority in Działoszyce, Szydłowiec, Chmielnik, Wodzisław, and Opatów (Urbański (2007, p. 9)).) However, the situation was different in Skarżysko-Kamienna, where according to the 1921 Polish census, Jewish followers accounted for 19.5% of the total population (1,590 out of 8,163 people), but only 946 people (11.6%) identified their nationality as Jewish. In 1937, there were 2.8 thousand Jewish residents, making up 14.2% of the population (the city's total population was 19.7 thousand).

In the 1930s, the idea of emigration to Palestine was promoted by the Revisionist Zionist Organization in Skarżysko. Supporters of Ze'ev Jabotinsky's ideology organized marches, lectures, and meetings, with a significant portion of the Jewish community participating. However, it is difficult to estimate how many Jews from Skarżysko emigrated to Palestine, though it mainly involved older individuals.

=== Industry, services, and trade ===
Although many Jews hoped to find work in the rapidly developing armaments industry in the city, they were not readily hired by such enterprises due to military secrecy. Therefore, the courses in mechanics, milling, and machine tools, organized by the Jewish Society for Vocational Work, proved to be of little use. However, many small enterprises were founded by Jews. These included mills, sawmills, iron foundries, factories producing files, nails, whetstones, roofing tiles, and paints. The trade in small goods was entirely in the hands of Jewish merchants. Jews also dominated in various crafts, owning shoemaking, hosiery, and tailoring shops.

The Jews of Skarżysko ran the following businesses and were involved in the following branches of trade:

- Barrel factory – N. Rosenbaum
- Sheet metal works – J. Foldberg and A. Herszenfus
- Sawmills – L. Berkowicz and the company Rojzner and Landau
- Manufacture of cloth – U. Eljasiewicz, Ch. Feldman, H. Feldman, Ch. Hapern, R. Lewin, L. Runinsztajn, S. Szarit, M. Tropre, J. Urbach
- Timber trade – A. Pfeffer, M. Tenenbaum, M. PLNoto, M. Zylberman
- Cattle trade – J. Bojmsztaj, Sz. Cukier, Ch. Rubinsztein, H. Szyfman
- Iron goods trade – M. Bitter, N. Kochen, F. Szafirsztajn

The state owned the iron foundries leased by Mendel Feldman: the Iron Casting Factory, which employed 242 workers, and the Iron Foundry and Enamel Works "Nowy Bzin" with 192 employees. In 1924, Feldman lost the lease, which led to the collapse of "Nowy Bzin". The entrepreneur's heirs started the Enamelware Factory "Praca" in 1935. Initially, about 150 people worked there, and Jankiel Bryks served as the factory director. Just before the outbreak of war, in May 1939, the factory was damaged by a flood. The water destroyed the furnaces and factory equipment, causing the employees to lose their jobs.

In 1930, the following trade unions were registered in Skarżysko-Kamienna: the Jewish Building Trade Union and the Jewish Leather Industry Trade Union. The latter was dissolved in 1938, partly due to the economic crisis. In the same year, a list of artisans was compiled, in which several of the 69 names indicated Jewish origins. Jewish names predominated in the list of grocery stores from 1930. The stores, mainly small ones, operated in a chain trade system, where several intermediaries earned a profit from a single product.

=== Jewish community ===
Although the Jewish community in Skarżysko-Kamienna did not officially exist until 1934, elections were held in 1924, organized by the Ministry of Religious Affairs and Public Education, which resulted in the formation of a board. A year later, the community notified the Końskie County office about the completion of the renovation of the mikveh and the tidying up of the cemetery, which led to the allocation of 1,000 PLN to increase the rabbi's salary. In 1926, Rabbi Szmul Leo Gelblum passed away. In the elections scheduled for 8 August, in which 247 people (94.5%) participated, Moszek Morgensztern won. However, the legality of the election was quickly challenged, with claims of corruption. Although Mordka Dawid Perl filed a complaint with the Supreme Administrative Court, the new rabbi was supported by, among others, the Union of Rabbis of the Republic, and Morgensztern was ultimately approved.

In 1931, 153 families were required to pay the community fee. This was expected to provide 1,930 PLN, which constituted 7.2% of the community's income. However, most of the income came from the slaughter of cattle – 17,500 PLN (i.e., 65.1% of the budget, which amounted to 26,900 PLN). On the expenditure side, 1,000 PLN was planned for schools, and over 10,000 PLN for the purchase of land for the construction of a new synagogue. The community also supported poor children studying at the Talmud Torah with a sum of 300 PLN. (Note: Little is known about Jewish education in Skarżysko-Kamienna. In addition to the Talmud Torah, which provided free education for poor children, there was also Bejs Jakow – a school for girls under the patronage of the orthodox party Agudat Yisrael (Wojewoda (2013, p. 265)).) In 1933, the community's income was just under 27,000 PLN, although it was estimated to exceed 38,500 PLN. At that time, the fee applied to 245 families and ranged from 2 to 300 PLN. In that year, the head of the board was Chairman Ajzenberg, and in 1934, it was Chil Wajnberg. For the needs of the community, 1,200 cows, 1,560 calves, 2,400 geese, and 7,000 poultry were slaughtered annually.

In the 1930s, a decision was made to renovate the synagogue, which was in poor condition, and to build a new one on Fabryczna Street. The brick building was solemnly opened on 19 December 1935. The constantly renovated mikvah remained in ruins and was unusable. In 1934, a fence was erected around the Jewish cemetery, and a caretaker's house was built.

=== Political activity ===
According to an assessment by the starosta of Końskie County from the early 1920s, the General Jewish Labour Bund influence predominated among Jewish workers. It is possible that a cell of this party existed in the settlement, as its activists were notably active during the 1922 parliamentary elections. In the 1930s, the city saw the presence of the Orthodox party Agudat Yisrael and Zionist parties such as Mizrachi and the Organization of Zionist Revisionists. Tadeusz Wojewoda suggests that the influence of the latter was particularly significant in the early 1930s. Although Jewish individuals were "disproportionately represented" in Skarżysko's communist organizations, the number of Jewish communists – about a dozen – constituted only a tiny fraction of the overall Jewish community in Skarżysko.

In the first municipal elections, Jewish votes (370) were roughly evenly split between Orthodox and Zionist lists. During the 1928 parliamentary elections, 367 Jewish votes were divided among four lists. The Bloc of National Minorities and the General Jewish National Electoral Bloc garnered limited, albeit real, support. Two years later, Jewish candidates appeared on four lists: the Bloc for the Defense of Jewish National Rights, Poale Zion, General Jewish Labour Bund, and the General Jewish National Economic Bloc. Of these, the last list received the most votes (224).

=== Polish-Jewish relations ===
In the 1920s, Polish-Jewish relations in the city were generally amicable, although occasional individual conflicts and mutual distrust occurred. Tadeusz Wojewoda cites examples from 1925, such as notes published in Głos Kamiennej, a newspaper whose contributors were sympathetic to nationalist ideas. For its editor (likely Jan Bargiel), the baptism of a Jewish woman, seen as a prelude to her marriage to a Pole, was considered commendable. This, however, provoked backlash from the Jewish community. Additionally, one issue of the paper featured an article warning against supporting Jewish-made goods, labeling such behavior a "crime". That same year, a lecture organized in the city by a representative of the Rozwój Society, titled The Role of Women in De-Judaizing Poland, was met with loud applause.

In December 1935, on the occasion of the opening of a new synagogue, the city's Jewish community sent homage telegrams to Marshal Edward Rydz-Śmigły and Prime Minister Marian Zyndram-Kościałkowski. However, such gestures did not prevent the deterioration of Polish-Jewish relations in the 1930s. This period saw the distribution of anti-Jewish leaflets and posters in the city, as well as instances of assaults on Jewish individuals. On 20 February 1939, during a meeting organized by the Skarżysko branch of the Camp of National Unity, a speaker encouraged boycotting Jewish shops.

== Holocaust (1939–1944) ==
=== Persecution ===
Exact data on the number of Jews living in Skarżysko-Kamienna at the outbreak of the war on 1 September 1939 is unavailable. Estimates in the literature suggest a population of 2,800 Jewish residents. This community faced persecution from the very first days of the German invasion. Wehrmacht soldiers assaulted Jews, forcibly cut the beards and sidelocks of Orthodox men, and raped Jewish women. A Jewish Council of Elders (Judenrat) was appointed as the representative body to deal with the German occupiers. Likely in early 1940, Skarżysko's rabbi, Hirsz Feldman, established contact with the American Jewish Joint Distribution Committee, enabling the opening of a communal kitchen that served approximately 600 inexpensive or free meals daily. Later, the Skarżysko delegation of the Jewish Social Self-Help Committee, established in Kielce in October 1940, likely took over part of this charitable work.

Skarżysko's Jews were forced by the Germans into compulsory unpaid labor. Initially, they cleared rubble from the destroyed city, filled bomb craters, swept streets and squares, and defused unexploded ordnance. During the winter of 1940, Jewish labor brigades cleared snow from streets and the road connecting Radom and Kielce. Among the approximately 10,000 Jews from the Radom District deported by the Germans to camps in the Lublin Land in the spring of 1940 were residents of Skarżysko-Kamienna. These individuals were employed in road construction and earthworks near Annopol. To assist those affected, the Skarżysko Judenrat established a medical dispensary that, in August 1940, provided aid to nearly 200 individuals and conducted a similar number of home visits.

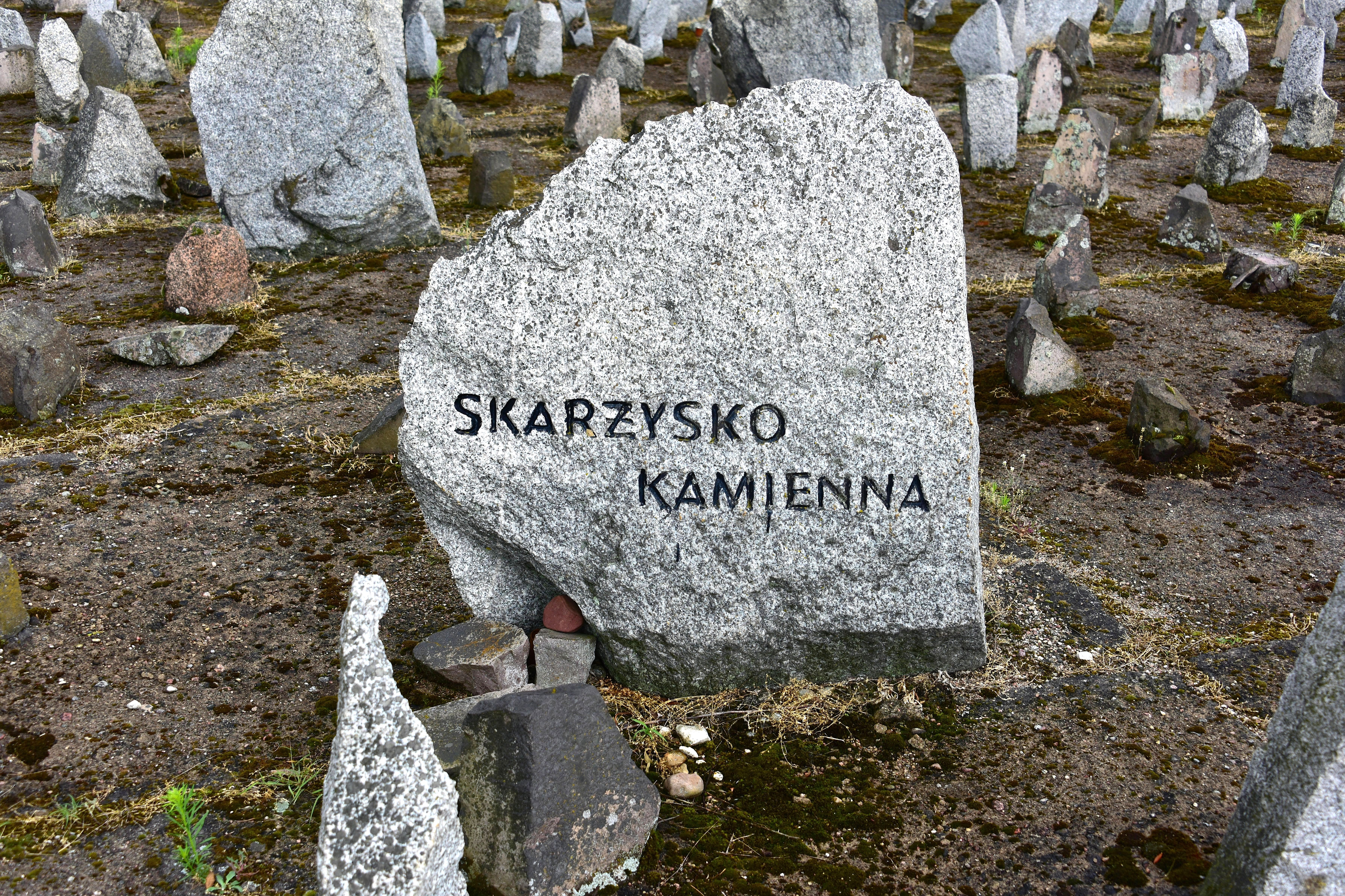
Memorial to the murdered Jews from Skarżysko-Kamienna at the former Treblinka extermination camp

Following the German invasion of Poland, there was no significant increase in the Jewish population in the city. Although in March 1941 a transport of Jews from Zichenau was directed to Skarżysko-Kamienna, the Germans ordered the newcomers to settle elsewhere. Some of these individuals, however, chose to remain in the city. In May 1941, a ghetto was established in Skarżysko-Kamienna, encompassing the streets 3 Maja, Limanowskiego, Podjazdowa, Fabryczna, and Wspólna. By early October 1942, when the ghetto was liquidated, approximately 3,000 people were living there. Some were executed on-site, 500 were transported to the forced labor camp at the HASAG factory, and the remaining residents were deported to the Treblinka extermination camp and murdered.

=== Forced labor camp ===
==== Establishment and development ====
In the former National Ammunition Factory, taken over by the German company HASAG, the occupiers established a forced labor camp. While sources confirm 38 transports of 17,200 workers to the camp, historians believe this represents only part of the total, estimating that from 25,000 to 30,000 people passed through the camp and that from 18,000 to 23,000 prisoners were murdered there.

Jews began working at the Skarżysko factory in mid-1941. They came from the city itself, Suchedniów, and nearby villages. Initially, their labor – expanding the factory, building roads, and unloading railway cars – was forced but did not require them to reside at the site. Jewish workers were housed within the factory only after replacing Polish laborers who had been deported to Leipzig and Altenberg. Initially, about 2,000 people were crowded into the building.

Jews from liquidated ghettos in the Radom District began arriving at the Skarżysko camp in late summer and autumn of 1942. In the second half of that year, approximately 5,000 individuals – mostly young men, as well as a group of women – were sent to Skarżysko-Kamienna. The inhuman labor, disease, and appalling living conditions led to high mortality rates among prisoners in 1943. Dying Jews were replaced with workers brought from concentration camps. Transports from the Kraków-Płaszów and Majdanek concentration camps continued until spring 1944. One of the camp's prisoners was Jakub Goldberg, who survived the Holocaust.

==== Labor and repression. Liquidation of the camp ====
The camp was divided into subcamps located near the Werk factories. Jewish prisoners in Werk A worked in one of four factory departments: the shell department, the so-called rifle department, the automatic weapons production department, and the tool shop. Production operated continuously in 12-hour shifts. Werk B produced, among other items, anti-aircraft gun ammunition and blanks for firearms. This department was overseen by Walter Glaue, who collaborated with a group of sadists. Among them, Georg Hering was particularly cruel. He supervised a room equipped with batons, sticks, and whips used for beating prisoners. The most hazardous working conditions were found in Werk C, where laborers were forced to fill shell and mine casings with TNT and picric acid. Prisoners worked without any safety measures, inhaling toxic fumes and handling powders that corroded their eyes and lungs. Mortality among Werk C workers was estimated at 25 deaths per week, often exceeding this number.

In the summer of 1944, as the Eastern Front reached the Vistula river, the Germans decided to evacuate the Skarżysko factory. This evacuation included not only machinery and equipment but also Jewish laborers. The prisoners underwent a selection process aimed at eliminating those deemed unfit for Nazi purposes. Approximately 500 prisoners were executed on-site. The remaining prisoners were divided into three groups. The first group was transported by rail to the HASAG facility in Częstochowa. The second group, consisting exclusively of women, was sent to the camp at the factory in Leipzig. The third transport carried Jewish men to the Buchenwald concentration camp.

==== Polish aid ====
Poles provided assistance to Jews held in the camp. In the spring of 1943, worker Tadeusz Nowak was arrested by the Germans for delivering correspondence or food to the imprisoned Jewish population. He was sentenced to death, which was carried out by public hanging on the factory grounds in the presence of the workers. Another supporter of Jewish laborers was Karol Łukomski, who worked in the factory kitchen and was murdered for his efforts. Józef Jarosz organized a group of several Polish individuals dedicated to aiding persecuted Jews. After the war, he was honored with the title Righteous Among the Nations.

== Commemoration ==
In the 1960s, a monument was erected near the Technical School Complex in Skarżysko-Kamienna to honor those murdered in the forced labor camp. Initially, the plaque on the monument did not specify the victims' nationality as Jewish. For many years, the monument also displayed an underestimated number of victims – 3,500. This figure was corrected to 35,000 (different from historians' estimates) after a report in the newspaper Echo Dnia. In 2014, a decision was made to amend the inscription to clarify that the victims were Jewish.

In 1987, at 1 Maja Street, a plaque commemorating Skarżysko's Jewish community, exterminated during the occupation, was unveiled at the initiative of the Committee of Jews Born in Skarżysko. On 4 June 1991, the synagogue complex at Fabryczna Street – which included a mikveh and the rabbi's residence – was added to the register of historic monuments under number 1114. However, it was removed from the register 14 years later, in the second half of 2005. In September 2006, following an order from municipal authorities, the synagogue ruins were demolished. The Jewish cemetery at Łyżwy Street, which contains several tombstones with legible inscriptions and decorations, has been cleaned and maintained.

== Bibliography ==
- Wojewoda, T. (2013). "Skarżysko w latach 1918–1939" [Skarżysko in the Years 1918–1939]. In Zemeła, K.; Kardyś, P. (eds.). Dzieje Skarżyska-Kamiennej. Monografia z okazji 90-lecia nadania praw miejskich [The History of Skarżysko-Kamienna: A Monograph on the 90th Anniversary of Receiving City Rights] (in Polish).
- Piątkowski, S. (2013). "Skarżysko-Kamienna w latach wojny i okupacji (1939–1945)" [Skarżysko-Kamienna During the War and Occupation (1939–1945)]. In Zemeła, K.; Kardyś, P. (eds.). Dzieje Skarżyska-Kamiennej. Monografia z okazji 90-lecia nadania praw miejskich [The History of Skarżysko-Kamienna: A Monograph on the 90th Anniversary of Receiving City Rights] (in Polish).
- Zemeła, K., ed. (2008). Skarżyski słownik biograficzny [Skarżysko Biographical Dictionary] (in Polish). Skarżysko-Kamienna: Muzeum im. Orła Białego w Skarżysku-Kamiennej.
- Urbański, Krzysztof (2007). Almanach gmin żydowskich województwa kieleckiego w latach 1918–1939 [Almanac of Jewish Communities in the Kielce Voivodeship from 1918 to 1939] (in Polish). Kielce: Muzeum Narodowe.
