= Christoph Klimke =

German writer (born 1959)

Christoph Klimke (born 22 November 1959) is a German writer. His work spans multiple formats—novels, plays, librettos for operas and ballets, poetry, and essays on film and literature. He has written several works on the Italian director and writer Pier Paolo Pasolini, including Wir sind alle in Gefahr, for which Klimke won the 1995 Ernst Barlach Prize. His novella Der Test oder: Chronik einer veruntreuten Seele was one of the key works in German AIDS literature of the 1990s.

== Life and career ==
Klimke was born in Oberhausen and grew up in Kleve. He received his secondary education at Freiherr-vom-Stein-Gymnasium where his father Wolfgang taught German and English literature for many years and was editor of Thomas Wolfe. After his abitur in 1978, he worked for a while in the German civil service and then pursued further studies in Bonn, Rome and Florence. On his return to Germany in the mid-1980s he settled in Berlin and began his career as a writer. At first he wrote for newspapers and worked as a translator from Italian to German for the publishing company Rowohlt Verlag.
