= Tezin Nan Dlo =

Haitian Creole folktale

Tezin Nan Dlo is a Haitian Creole folktale with many versions. It deals with the relationship between a human girl and a fish she summons with a magical song; eventually, her family discovers the secret meetings and kills the fish, and the girl dies out of grief for losing her friend.

According to scholarship, the story is well-known in Haiti, and similar tales have been located across the West Indies, the Caribbean and in West Africa.

== Summary ==
=== Taizan, My Dear Friend ===
In this tale, a girl lives in Haiti with her father and stepmother, and goes to the river to sing and be with her fish lover. The girl's stepmother forces her to do tasks around the house, and becomes annoyed that her step-daughter takes so long to come back from the river, so she decides to follow her one day. After the girl reaches the river, she summons the fish, called Taizan, by singing some verses; the fish appears to her and both play and make love in the water. The stepmother goes home and hurries to the fields to tell her husband about his daughter's amorous encounter. The following day, the girl's father and the stepmother follow the girl again, and the man sees the liaison between his daughter and the fish. He decides there is no harm in what his daughter is doing, but his wife wants the animal dead and convinces him that same night to prepare the manchet (knife). The next morning, they send the girl to sell some sweet potatoes, while the man goes to the river to kill the fish. It happens thus: the man repeats his daughter's verses, the fish appears to him and the man strikes the animal with the knife, almost decapitating it. The girl comes home from the market and goes to the river to be with the fish. She summons him once, but he does not come; so she sings a second time, and still he does not appear. She then notices the blood on the water's surface and dives to the river's depths. Down there, she sees the fish in agony, its head almost cut off, and, in tears, goes to kiss it. However, she holds the fish, and its head falls off. The story then explains the girl's love for the fish was so strong, she becomes one with it, and that is how mermaids come to be.

=== The Love Story of Thézin and Zilla ===
In a Haitian tale titled Les amours de Thézin et de Zilla ("The Love Story of Thézin and Zilla"), Zilia, the beautiful daughter of Ménélas, turns men's heads around with her beauty and charm. This includes a silver fish named Thézin, who professes his love for the girl and they spend time together by the river margin. The girl also brings fresh water in her calabasse, but, when her brother Jean is sent to fetch water himself, the water is always muddy. One day, Jean decides to trail behind Zilia and finds her engaging with her fish lover by a rock in the river, then goes to tell their father about it. After Zilia returns, Ménélas tells the girl he is worried by her prolonged absences, but she says nothing. Some time later, when Zilia is with Thézin, the fish predicts that when three drops of blood stain a white robe, that portends that Thézin is dead. She heeds his words with concern, and goes to sell vegetables at the market. While she is occupied, her father and her brother reach the river margin, and Jean mimics his sister's voice to call out for Thézin. The fish appears to them, and Ménélas, uttering some spells, draws the fish to his sabre and kills it, staining the water with red, then returns home. Back to Zilia, she sees the drops of blood on the white robe and rushes to the river, calling out for her lover, but he does not answer. The girl then goes back home, takes a seat at the back of her house, and sings for hours, when the ground opens up and swallows her whole, leaving only a lock of her long hair.

=== Sister and Brother: Clean and Dirty Water ===
Linguist Robert A. Hall Jr. collected a Haitian Creole tale he titled Sister and Brother: Clean and Dirty Water. In this tale, a woman has two children, a girl and a young boy. Whenever the girl goes to fetch water, she returns with clean water, unlike her younger brother, who returns with dirty. The mother questions the boy about it, who answers that his sister lets him go ahead of her, so he decides to spy on her the next time she goes to fetch water. The next day, the girl waits by the water and sends her brother ahead of her, but the boy hides behind a tree and sees his sister singing some verses to someone named Tezeng; a big fish appears to her and fills her calabash with clean water. The boy returns home and tells her mother about it, and the woman waits for her husband's returns to warn him. After he learns of the story, he plans a course of action: the girl is to be given errands to do in town (buying pepper, salt, onions, thread and anything). The next morning, the girl visits Tezeng before she goes to town, and the fish predicts that, by noon, three drops of blood will appear on her handkerchief, which will mean that Tezeng is dead. The girl rushes to town to do her errands as quickly as possible, but her father goes to the water. The girl's brother summons Tezeng, the fish, the man shoots the animal to death and kills it, then takes it home to cook it and prepare a meal for the girl. When the girl returns home from town, her mother gives her the cooked fish to eat; she goes behind the house and begins to sing, as she slowly sinks to the ground. The girl's brother alerts his mother the girl is disappearing into the ground, but the mother refuses to believe it, until she herself goes to check on her daughter, who has all but disappeared under the earth, a lock of her hair all that is left of her.

=== Thézin ===
Haitian anthropologist Suzanne Comhaire-Sylvain collected a tale titled Thézin. In this tale, a girl named Noémi lives with her brother and parents in a house atop a hill overlooking a river. Noémi's mother sends both her and her brother to fetch water from the river. One day, Noémi is by the river, when she drops her gem-encrusted golden ring in the water. Inside the river, a red fish named Thézin finds the ring and comes up to the surface, meeting the girl. They introduce themselves to each other, and Thézin returns her ring and fills her water bucket with fresh water. She keeps coming back to the river and whenever she wants to meet with the fish, she summons him by a magical command: "Thézin, Thézin nan d'lo", eventually falling in love with each other. Some time later, Noémi's mother notices her daughter always brings fresh water, while her son brings muddy water. The girl's brother decides to follow Noémi to the river, and discovers her encounters with the fish, then returns home to inform his mother. The mother, not believing it at first, follows her daughter to the river and finds it for herself, then goes back home and tells her husband a loup-garou (in the tale's context, meaning 'a sorcerer') in the shape of a fish cast a spell on her, and he must be killed. Noémi's father then orders the girl to go to her godmother the next morning to fetch some grains of Palma Christi. The next morning, Noémi talks to Thézin by the river and the fish predicts that, if she sees three droplets of blood on her handkerchief, it means he died, and she must hurry to the river, but he assures her they will still live happily. Worried about his prediction, she goes to his godmother, while her father and little brother go to the river. The man tries to summon the fish with his low voice, and the fish pays no heed to it, but the little brother mimics Noémi's voice and he comes up to the surface. Noémi's father seizes the chance to capture Thézin, beat him down, and take him home with him to make a court-bouillon out of it. Back to Noémi, after she finishes her errands, she produces her handkerchief and notices the three droplets of blood, just as Thézin predicted. so she rushes to the river margin to check on her lover. She desperately sings the song to summon him, but the water remains still. Noémi then returns home and, seeing the house empty, finds pieces of the fish's flesh strewn about by the window. Finally, she sits on a chair and begins to sing the same song to summon Thézin, and the chair slowly sinks to the ground just as she keeps singing. Her brother, Ti-Frè, finds her like this and shouts at her to leave, but she remains catatonic and keeps singings. Ti-Frè rushes to his father to seek help, but he is too distant, and, when both come back to their house, there is only a tuft of Noémi's hair visible in the place where she stood. The father tries to pull it out, but can only draw some locks of hair. Comhaire-Sylvain also reported the ending of a variant found in northern Haiti: after Noémi's father kills the fish, she goes to the river margin and finds a handsome man, which is Thézin after being released from his curse. In a later article, Comhaire-Sylvain stated that the source for this tale was a girl from Baconoir (Nippes).

=== Tezeng ===
Comhaire-Sylvain collected another Haitian Creole tale and published it in the Journal of American Folklore. In this tale, titled Tezẽ or Tezeng, a girl named Naomi lives with her parents and her little brother, and goes to fetch water by the river, where she meets her lover, a fish named Tezeng, by singing a song. They spend time together and fall in love with each other, and the fish fills her water bucket with fresh water. One day, Naomi's mother notices that her son, Naomi's brother, always brings home with him muddy water, and warns the boy to fetch clean water. The next day, the boy only finds muddy water and is scolded by his mother, so he questions where his elder sisters finds such clean water, and decides to investigate. The next time Naomi goes to meet Tezeng, the boy spies on her through some reeds and learns the secret song, then goes home. Some time later, his mother orders him to fetch clean water for the family, and the boy blurts Tezeng's name, which catches his mother's attention, so the woman trails behind Naomi the next time she meets the fish, then goes home to warn her husband. She tells her husband a "witch" turned into a fish and cast a spell to steal Naomi's soul, and her husband decides to kill it and cook it. The following morning, Naomi's family sends her to town with a load of beans, and she goes to talk to Tezeng one last time before she goes: the fish warns her that, if three drops of blood appear on the left breast, on the dress, it means Tezeng has been killed. While she is away, her father and brother go to the river: the boy summons Tezeng to fill his pitcher, which the fish means to do, when the boy's father shoots him twice. The man cuts Tezeng's body and brings it home to be cooked as fish soup. Back to Naomi, she finds the blood omen on her dress and rushes to the river margin to summon Tezeng, but he does not answer, so she goes home crying, knowing her lover is dead. After she goes home, she notices the pieces of the fish and the broth, realizing what her father did, then puts on her New Year's dress, takes a doll and goes to a chair behind the house. She sits on the chair, then starts to sing the verses she used to call Tezeng, and begins to sink into the ground. Her brother tries to rescue her, but he is too weak to pull her out of the hole, so he goes to fetch his father to help. Naomi's father appears and can only see a lock of her hair visible, which he tries to pull.

=== Mr. Tezeng ===
Comhaire-Sylvain collected a third Haitian Creole tale from a yardboy in Leogane in 1931 and published it in the Journal of American Folklore. In this tale, titled Msye Tezẽ or Mr. Tezeng, a mother dislikes her daughter's suitors and quarrels with them. One day, she sends her daughter to fetch water by the river, and the girl meets a boy named Mr. Tezeng who helps her and fill her bucket with fresh water. She goes the next day and sings a song to call upon Mr. Tezeng. In time, the mother notices that her daughter always brings clear water, while her son, the girl's little brother, brings dirty water. The boy then sings his mother Mr. Tezeng's song. The woman asks the meaning of the verses, and the boy answers that his elder sister calls a man named Mr. Tezeng that furnishes her with clear water. After the girl comes home, the girl's mother forbids her from meeting him ever again, since she does not want vagrants in their family. The girl cries about it and goes to meet Mr. Tezeng to talk to him about the situation. Suddenly, the Mistress of the Waters appears to them and says their situation can be rectified if Mr. Tezeng agrees to be turned into a fish. Mr. Tezeng agrees and is turned into a fish, then splashes in the water. The girl keeps meeting her lover in secret, by calling upon him with the song, then goes home with clear water. After some time, the woman notices the same situation about the clear and the dirty water, and questions her son again. The boy says his elder sister keeps coming to the same water source and sings the same song to summon Mr. Tezeng, despite being forbidden to do so long ago. The woman does not believe her son's words at first, until she follows her daughter and confirms it. The woman sees that, for all intents and purposes, her daughter married without her consent, goes homes and talks to her husband about it. They send the girl to town, while the father arms himself with a machete and takes the boy to the river margin. The boy summons Mr. Tezeng and the fish appears to him, then the father attacks the animal with the machete. Mr. Tezeng bleeds profusely and regains his human shape. In his last words, he says he married the man's daughter, and he was richer than anyone else in the country, then expires. The girl's father regrets his decision, and informs the girl of her lover's death. She fails to eat anymore, and dies. Comhaire-Sylvain also reported a variant of "Mr. Tezeng", wherein he recovers and goes to live with his wife's family.

=== Tale of the crazy fish ===
Haitian author René Depestre published a tale furnished by a person named Laudrun. In this tale, titled Conte du poisson fou ("Tale of the crazy fish"), a girl named Lovéna falls in love with a fish named Zin Thezin, who lives in the river. She liked to wash clothes in the river, and loves to spend time with the fish near the water. Sometimes, the girl takes off her clothes and swims in the water to be with her "black buck", and Zin Thezin "drew his bow" and "played upon" Lovéna's body. Lovéna's father, however, begins to suspect something about his daughter's prolonged absences, investigates and learns of the girl's amorous encounters. Thus, he begins to send her off to do the marketing far away from the farm, so she cannot disturb his plans. One day, Lovéna's father goes to the river and summons Zin Thezin by mimicking his daughter's voice. The fish, who was apart from his human lover for many days, emerges from the water to embrace her, thinking it is Lovéna, and the girl's father hits him with a cudgel. The fish then drowns. The story then explains that, before this time, Zin Thezin had warned Lovéna about an omen about his death: three drops of blood on her left breast. It happens thus: Lovéna, away at the time, in the middle of the market, notices the blood on her left breast and rushes to the river. When she reaches the river, there is only a scarlet stain on the water. Her father is nearby and she questions if he killed her lover. The man expresses disgust at his daughter's cavorting with an animal, and answers he did kill Zin Thezin. Suddenly, a machete strikes the man's throat, killing him - Lovéna's revenge for the killing, then the girl sits on the river bank and sings a lament about her slain lover Zin Thezin. Meanwhile, her family (brothers, grandmothers, uncles, aunts), who were hidden behind the copse, watches the scene, but are unable to move an inch. At last, Lovéna lets herself be led away by the river current, her voice echoing in the water.

=== The little girl who loved a fish in the water ===
Anthropologist Elsie Clews Parsons collected a tale from Haiti with the title ’Tit fi’ a té aimé un poisson na d’l’eau ("The little girl who loved a fish in the water"). In this tale, a woman has two children, a girl and a little boy. The girl goes to the water and summons a fish named Tinzin, who she has fallen in love with, and it fills her bucket with clear water. As for her brother, he can only find dirty water. The woman questions her son about it, and the boy reveals that his sister chants a song near the river, which he sings to his mother. The next day, the woman sends her daughter to town, but she goes to meet Tinzin before she goes there. The fish tells her that when she finds a drop of blood on her left breast, it means the animal is dead. While the girl goes to the town, her father goes to the river and summons Tinzin with the song. After the fish comes out of the water, the man hacks it with a machete. After the girl comes home from her errands on town and does not eat any food, then visits the river to talk to Tinzin, but he does not appear after she sings his song. The girl then goes home, to the back of the house and begins to cry and sing at the same time. Suddenly, she begins to sink into the ground. Her brother watches the scene and warns his mother about it, but the woman does not believe it and scolds him. The boy then goes to his father and brings him to the scene. The man tries to pull her out of the earth by her hair, and can only grasp some strands of her hair between his hands.

=== Tayzanne ===
Author and folklorist Diane Wolkstein published a Haitian tale titled Tayzanne, which she prepared for publication by combining a version from a teller named Solange at Thor, a teller named Justine at Carrefour-Dufort, and a tale published by Comhaire-Sylvain. In this tale, a girl named Velina and her brother are sent to a spring to fetch water. One day, however, when the girl goes to fetch water, her rings drops in the water. Suddenly, a silver-golden fish comes to the surface and brings back her ring. He introduces himself as Tayzanne, and offers to fill her bucket with clear, sweet water. Velina thanks the fish and goes home. This situation goes on: the girl brings fresh water, and the boy, her brother, only muddy water. Their mother advises the boy to be careful the next time. The boy still brings home muddy water and his mother scolds him. Wanting to find out how Velina finds such water, he follows her one day, and sees the girl summoning the fish by singing some verses. He returns home and tells his mother he can find fresh water if he summons Tayzanne, but the mother believes the fish is an evil spirit, then decides to see Velina's deed for herself. Tayzanne senses Velina's mother wishes to kill him, and warns the girl a sign will portent his death: three drops of blood on her left breast, but assures her they will be together in the end. Back to Velina's mother, the woman tells her husband their daughter has been consorting with an evil spirit and bids him kill it the next morning. Thus, they send Velina to the marketplace to sell vegetables, although she is reluctant to go. While she is away, the mother, her husband and her son go to the spring and call upon the fish: the mother goes first, but the waters remain calm; so the boy mimics his sister's voice and Tayzanne appears to them, leaping out of the spring. Velina's father ties a rope around its large body and kills it with a machete. Meanwhile, Velina finds the three drops of blood to her breast and rushes home: she finds her mother cooking a large fish, then hurries to the spring to call upon Tayzanne with the song. However, the fish does not come the first time, so she keeps singing to him, until she gives up and returns home. Once there, she sits on a chair and begins to comb her hair in front of a mirror, then begins to sing, and her chair starts to sink into the ground. Velina's brother appears at the scene and tries to comfort her, but she is too buried in her grief. The boy then tries to warn his mother: At first she does not believe it, but she accompanies her son to where Velina was and finds her daughter being swallowed by the earth and tries to pull her out, but the girl keeps sinking, until all that is left of her is her hair.

=== A Fish in Love ===
Haitian-Canadian novelist Dany Laferrière included a version of the tale in his work An aroma of coffee. In the tale, a fish lives in Vialet, in a pond. A girl named Clémentine goes to fetch water and summons the fish, Tezin, by singing some verses, and he provides her with fresh, clean water, unlike other girls. One day, one of these girls spies on Clémentine calling upon the fish, and goes to tell Clémentine's father about it. The next day, the man sends his daughter to fetch water, and trails behind to investigate himself. After Clémentine summons the fish, her father rushes to the animal with a machete and kills it, then brings it home for his wife to cook it. The girl, however, refuses to touch the food, and goes to sit on a wicker chair in her house, where she begins to sing Tezin's song and slowly sink into the earth. Her mother goes to look for her, and finds the girl just as she sank to the ground, a braid of her hair visible. Her mother pulls the hair and it remains in her hands.

=== Tésin, My Good Friend ===
In this tale, a beautiful girl Roxane lives with her parents and younger brother Brezilien. Both are sent to fetch water by a pond at the foot of a waterfall, but Roxane always brings fresh water, and Brezilien always brings muddy water. Noticing this situation, the boy decides to look into it and follows his sister the next time she goes to the waterfall. He hides behind some trees and sees Roxane summoning one named "Tésin" by singing some verses: a fish with golden and pearly scales appears from the pond and leaps to Roxane's lap to embrace her with its fins. They exchange words of love, then the fish falls back into the water. Brezilien goes back home and tells his father everything. The man decides to teach the fish a lesson, and goes to the pond at the foot of the waterfall with a rifle and accompanied by his son. The boy mimics his sister's voice and summons the fish Tésin; it appears and the boy's father aims the rifle to shoot at it, then takes the dead fish home for his wife to prepare a fish fry for the family. The family eats the dish, save for the girl, who retires to the courtyard to mourn for her slain lover, by singing the verses over and over. Her brother, remorseful at his actions, goes to console her, but, as soon as he goes to meet his sister, he finds her slowly sinking into the earth, and goes to alert his father. The man does not believe his son's words and scolds him. Next, the boy goes to fetch his mother, and both go to the courtyard: Roxane is still sinking into the ground, only a wisp of hair visible. The woman tries to pull her daughter by the hair, but only the tuft remains in her hands. However, Roxane has not died: after she goes down the earth, she reaches a beautiful palace where a prince has been waiting for her. Suspecting the prince is her "good friend" Tésin, she goes to embrace him, and he explains that a witch cursed him into fish form, and the spell would only be broken if a woman, still alive, entered the land of dead in search for him. Rejoicing in finding her lover again, Roxane and Tésin marry, and she forgives her family for their previous deeds.

=== Tezen, the Master of the Water ===
Haitian author Mimi Barthélémy published a Haitian tale titled Tezen, le Maître de L'Eau ("Tezen, the Master of the Water"): a couple live in a mountainous country with their children Séfi, the elder daughter, and Casséus, the younger son. Somewhere in this country, there is a secret pond filled with water. Séfi and Casséus are sent to fetch water: Séfi always brings potable water, but her brother always finds dirty water. One day, Séfi is polishing her ring next to the river, and it falls in the water. Suddenly, a fish named Tezen, of ebony and silver colours, appears to her from the water and bids her not to cry, then returns her ring. Tezen also sings some verses and asks to be her "amie", then clear, pure water bubbles at the fish's pond, which Séfi takes for her, thanks Tezen and agrees to his companionship. Séfi's parents congratulate her for finding good water, and reproach her brother for bringing dirty. One day, Casséus decides to check for himself where his elder sister is getting the water, and follows her to the river margin. Séfi sings a song to summon Tezen; the fish appears and both exchange verses filled with love. Casséus goes home and alerts his parents about their daughter's amorous encounters with the fish. The couple the decide to apart one from the other forever, for they believe the fish is a baka. The next day, Séfi's parents send her on a distant trip to sell some fruits from their backyard, and all the while she sings some songs to herself, and thinks on Tezen's words: if she sees three pearls of blood on her left breast, he is dead. Back to the couple, they take Casséus with them to the river so the boy can mimic his sister's voice and call upon Tezen with the same lyrics. It happens thus: Tezen appears to them, thinking it is Séfi, but the man strikes the fish with a sharpened machette and kills it. Meanwhile, Séfi is walking distracted by the sights on the way, when she notices the blood on her chest, confirming Tezen's prediction. She rushes back home and finds her family eating a dish made with the fish. In her grief, she goes to the backyard to sit on a chair, and begins to sing to herself the same verses she sang to Tezen to summon him. Suddenly, the chair Séfi is sitting on begins to sink into the ground, dampened by her tears. Casséus, her brother, calls for his parents' help: the mother arrives just in time to see her daughter's body sinking, and her voice singing about how life separated them, so she will meet Tezen in the realm of the dead. The girl's father comes to help Séfi by pulling her by her hair, but only some strands remain on his hand. At last, the story explains that Séfi descended into the mountain, and rejoined Tezen in his "domain of pure waters", and her song can be heard in some nights of full moon.

== Analysis ==
According to scholarship, the tale is a very popular Creole folktale with many variants, both in Anglophone and Francophone spheres. In addition, according to Haitian anthropologist Suzanne Comhaire-Sylvain, the tale is "widespread" ('plus repándu', in the original) in Haiti.

Helen Leneva Flowers, in her dissertation A Classification of the Folktale of the West Indies by Types and Motifs, recognized a local West Indian tale type about the heroine's fish-lover, which would suggest an approximation to the international cycle of the Animal as Bridegroom, although both the heroine and the fish die at the end of the tale.

=== Motifs ===
The tales contain the motif B610.1., "Girl's animal lover slain by spying relatives".

==== The fish-lover's name ====
According to Diane Wolkstein, the fish's name, Tézin, is a Creole word composed of zin, 'hook' in Creole, and past participle té. As such, Wolkstein argues, his name means both 'hook' and 'hooked'. Another etymology connects the word to the etymon tanze, which means a type of fish in Efut and Ejagham, possibly from Ejagham ta, meaning 'lord, father', and nsi 'fish'.

== Variants ==
=== America ===
==== North America ====
Professor Alcée Fortier collected a Louisiana Creole tale titled Posson Doré or The Golden Fish. In this tale, a girl is enamoured of a human prince, but her father dislikes the idea of her marrying off and hires a wizard to cast a spell on the prince. On one occasion where the girl and the prince are by the river, the wizard turns him into a red fish that jumps into the water. Time passes, and the girl cannot forget the prince, so she goes to the river to sing a song. After her song is finished, the waves part and her lover, in fish form, appears to her with food. The girl's father discovers the meetings have continued, and follows her the next time she summons the fish. As she sings the song, he shoots at the fish, killing it, and brings it home to cook it. He forces his daughter to prepare the fish and, after, to sit with them and eat it. The girl refuses to follow her father's orders. Later, she goes to the river where her family have thrown the fish scales, and weeps so much the ground opens up and swallows her, leaving only a strand of her hair visible. The tale was retold by author Virginia Hamilton as Marie and the Redfish in her book Her Stories, wherein the heroine is given the name Marie and her lover is called Redfish.

Artist Pamela Petro, in her book Sitting up with the dead: A storied journey through the American south, published a tale furnished by Ghanaian critic Kwame Dawes when he still lectured at the University of South Carolina. In Dawes's tale, titled The Story of the Girl and The Fish, which explains the origin of water lilies, a young maiden lives with her father and younger nasty brothers. Her father wishes to have her married, but she refuses his choices. He eventually finds a rich boy for her to marry and, despite her refusal, sets up their marriage in four months' time. Eventually, a hard drought strikes the land for months on end. On the one hand, the girl is happy the wedding may not happen at all, but, on the other hand, people are suffering for the lack of water, so her father sends her to the river to fetch whatever water she can. The girl goes to the river with a bucket and can only cry when she find there mud. Suddenly, she hears a voice: it is a fish's which appears in the river and offers to fill up her bucket. The girl ponders the fish's offer for a while, but agrees. After some time, the fish returns with the bucket filled with clear water. The girl goes back home with the water and her father inquires her about where she got it, but she refrains from answering it. Her encounters with the fish keep happening: the girl goes to fetch fresh water for her father to fill a vat, and begins to fall in love with the fish. As the date for her wedding approaches, she vehemently refuses to marry her suitor her father chose for her, and goes to the river. Meanwhile, her younger brothers see her that she is upset and decide to follow her. When she reaches the river, they see that the fish is kissing the girl, and go back home to warn their father about it. The man does not believe it at first, until the brothers take him to the same river so he can see it for himself. That same night, the girl goes back home, and her father questions where she has been all day, and sends her to her room. While she sleeps, the father and his two sons to go the river; one of the boys pretends to be the girl and calls the fish. As soon as the animal appears, the trio start to beat it with sticks to an inch of its life, then take the fish home with them. After they enter, they toss the fish to the girl and mock her for having had dalliances with the fish, but the girl cries for their cruelty, takes the injured fish and walks away through the door. She goes through valleys and forests, singing a sad song which reaches the ears of the women from the village, and reaches a high mountain with a lake down below, bathed in moonlight. The girl goes down to the lake with the fish in her hands, enters the water, and her body begins to transform into white flowers that float on the river. The fish regains his vitality and swims next to the water lilies.

Anthropologist Elsie Clews Parsons collected a tale from the Sea Islands, South Carolina, with the title The Mermaid. In this tale, a couple have a daughter. The woman dies and the man marries another woman with two daughters. However, the girl's step-family begins to mistreat her and do not let her eat food, and she goes to cry at the river. A mermaid appears and asks her what it the matter. The girl confides in him about her problems; the mermaid then takes the girl with him down to the river, gives her food and drink, and brings her back to the surface. The girl returns home and does not have to eat anything, which arouses her step-family's suspicions. The next day, the girl goes to the river and calls upon the mermaid with a song: "Take me down, pretty Joe". After two days of this situation repeating, the elder step-daughter decides to follow her step-sister and finds her with the mermaid, then informs her mother and father about it. The next day, everyone goes to the river. The father tries to imitate his daughter's voice, but sings the wrong lyrics, so does the elder daughter. The younger daughter sings the correct verses and the mermaid appears to them, then the man kills it with a shot. The next time, the girl goes to the river and tries to summon the mermaid, but he does not appear, so she keeps singing in vain, enters the water and drowns.

==== Latin America ====
Folklorist Terrence Hansen, in his catalogue of Latin American folktales, identified two Latin American subtypes wherein a girl meets an enchanted fish and is taught magic to summon fish (in one) or to bring fresh water (in the other). As the story continues, the girl's relatives imitate her voice to draw out the fish and kill it. In the first type, the girl drowns herself in the sea; in the other, she sinks to the ground after she sees the dead fish. The second subtype was abstracted from a tale published in a compilation of American folktales by folklorist Félix Coluccio. Coluccio's source was Comhaire-Sylvain's Thézin (see above). American folklorist Stith Thompson, in his 1961 revision of the international index, integrated Hansen's tale type (to which the subtypes belong) into the catalogue as type AaTh 431C*, "The Fish Lover".

Scholar Manuel José Andrade published a Dominican tale from La Vega with the title El cuento del pecadito ("The Tale of the Little Fish"): a girl is sent by her parents to draw water by the river, when she catches a fish there which becomes her friend. She goes to meet the pecadito, which she summons with a phrase, and they spend some time near the river. The girl starts to come home late, and spins a story about having to go upstream to find more water. One day, the mother sends the girl's little brother to check on his sister, and finds her talking to the fish. The boy returns home to tell his mother, who accompanies him to the river to watch the scene. The next day, the family send the girl to an aunt in a distant town, and mother, father and brother go to the river. The boy imitates the girl's voice and summons the little fish, which appears, fooled by the trick. The girl's father then kills the fish. After the killing, the girl returns home and is sent again to fetch water. She tries to summon the little fish, but this time he does not appear. She keeps calling for him amidst tears, enters the river and drowns.

==== Jamaica ====
Ethnographer Martha Warren Beckwith collected two Jamaican tales which she grouped under the banner "The Fish Lover". In the first tale, collected from a teller named James White, from Maroon Town, Jamaica, with the title Timbo Limbo, a man has a daughter named Lydia. After his first wife dies, he remarries and has children with his second wife. One day, Lydia is given a heavy jug for her to go to the riverside and fill it with water. She goes to the river and cries for her task, when a Jack-fish appears in the water and offers to fill her jug with water, if the agrees to become its wife. Lydia agrees and the fish fulfills the task. She returns home and lies to her stepmother that no one helper her. The next morning, Lydia takes the jug with her and goes to the riverside to meet the fish. Suspecting something, the stepmother sends one of her children after Lydia. The girl spies on Lydia summoning the Jack-fish (called Timbo Limbo) by singing a song. The child goes back home and informs her mother, who waits for Lydia's father so he can also be made aware of his daughter's affair. After he arrives, he is told of Lydia's meeting with the fish, and decides a course of action: the next morning, they will send Lydia to Montego Bay to buy some black pepper and skelion, while they go to the river. As soon as his plan is set in motion, he takes the little girl to sing the song by the river, draw out the fish and shoot at it. It happens thus: they kill the fish and bring it home. However, as they remove the scales from the fish, one of them escapes and flies away all the way to Lydia. The girl takes the scale and recognizes it as the Jack-fish's, then rushes to the riverside. She begins to call on him, but the waters stay still, until blood appears to her. At last, she goes into the water and drowns.

Beckwith collected another tale from teller Richard Pottinger, from Claremont, Saint Ann Parish. In this tale, titled Dear Old Juna, a couple have a daughter who is engaged to a young human suitor and to a fish, and to both she cooks food. The girl goes to the river with some food and summons the fish, called "Dear Old Juna", and feeds it. This goes on for days. One time, however, the girl's human suitor goes to the river with a gun, summons the fish and kills it, then brings it home to the couple to cook it. After the dish is made of the fish's flesh, he invites the girl to eat with him. After the meal, the girl discovers what she ate and dies at once.

==== West Indies ====
Anthropologist Elsie Clews Parsons collected a tale from Andros Island with the title The Fish Lover: a girl rejects suitors. One day, she goes to the river margin and meets a fish who offers to become her lover and marry her. She sings a song to him, and they marry. Her family dislikes the girl's choice, but the girl says she loves him. The girl's brother follows her and discovers her lover is a fish, then informs their mother. The mother refuses to believe, so the girl's brother goes to the water bank, summons the fish with the same song and kills it, then brings the dead fish home to show his mother.

Author Charles Lincoln Edwards collected a Bahaman tale titled De Girl an’ De Fish: a girl goes to the seashore to fetch saltwater, finds a fish and carries it home with her. She names it Choncho-wally and raises it in a well, until it is large enough, and sings to it some verses about the fish wanting to marry her. She spends her days feeding the fish and singing. The girl's little brother tells their father his sister has something at the well, and the father takes the boy to spy on her. They hear her singing the song to the fish, then leaves. After she goes back home, the father takes a grange ('fish-spear'), sings the girl's song to draw the fish out of the well, and kills it. The then brings the fish home with him to cook it. The family eats the cooked fish. Later, the girl goes to the well and sings a song to summon the fish, but it does not react to the music. So she keeps singing and crying, until she cries herself to death.

Author Mary Pamela Ellis Milne-Home published a West Indian tale titled The Girl and the Fish. In this tale, a girl goes to the river margin to fetch water, but takes so long to perform the task, they decide to spy on her. On one occasion, the girl says something to the water and a fish appears to her, which is her sweetheart. The next day, they go to the river and summon the fish with the same words, capture it and bring it home to cook it. They also give some of the fish meat to the girl when she goes home. However, she hears a voice telling her that what the girl is eating is flesh from her lover, and that his heart is in the pig's tub; she is to take the fish's heart, wrap it in a handkerchief, go to the river where three stones are, stand of the middle one and dip the fish's heart three times in water. The girl follows the voice's instructions and goes to the river: after she dips the heart three times, she sinks into the water and meets her lover, now human, and goes to live with him down the river.

==== Caribbean ====
Elsie Parsons collected a tale titled Fish Lover from a St. Croix source. In this tale, a girl rejects her all her suitors, until she walks by the seaside and a fish offers to marry her, and she accepts. She goes to the seaside every day and calls on the fish by its name, Leo. The fish showers her with presents which she brings home with her to show her family, but her parents are not too keen on her being courted by a fish. Thus, the father sharpens a hatchet and keeps his daughter at home on a certain day, then goes to the seaside to wait for the fish to appear. When the fish emerges out of the water, hoping to find the girl, the man attacks the fish and cuts off its head, then brings its body home for his wife to cook it. During the meal, the girl's little brother asks for more portions, and the girl denies his request. The boy, then, blabs about the source of their food: the girl's fish lover. The girl drops her dish and runs to the seaside to summon the fish, but he does not come. She calls on it for days, and dies of a broken heart. Later, her father, her brother and her mother each go to the seaside looking for each other, and, one by one, they die of a broken heart.

==== Haiti ====
Comhaire-Sylvain collected a variant named Amẽn ak Bablasẽ, translated as Amen and Bablassen, from an informant named Anastase Joseph, from Guibert. In this tale, a woman has a pair of children, a daughter called Amen and a young son with sore feet, called Johnny in the English translation (Ti-Žã, in the Creole text). Johnny brings dirty water, but Amen brings clear water, which makes their mother questions why it happens so. The following day, Johnny follows after his elder sister and spies on her, then returns home to inform her of the discovery: Amen receives fresh water from a man that comes from the water whom she will marry. The woman is furious at her daughter's indiscretion and tells her husband about it when he comes home. The man decides to kill his daughter's lover, called Bablassen, by sending her away on some errand in town. Young Johnny tells his father he knows the secret song Amen sings to draw Bablassen out of the water. On Wednesday, Amen summons Bablassen and comments that her parents wish to kill him. Bablassen tells Amen to let them do it, and tells her to go up to Gros-Morne Hill and watch the sea: if it is red, he is dead; if it is blue, he is safe. Amen goes to town. Meanwhile, on Thursday, her family goes to the water and summons Bablassen. The man fills up Johnny's bucket, then his father comes out of hiding and shoots Bablassen dead. Bablassen falls in the water, his blood falling in the water. The tale explains Bablassen is the Master of the Water and wanted to marry Amen. Amen's father takes his corpse, which has turned into a fish, back home, slices it and cooks it for his family, then spares a portion of his flesh for their daughter, in a dish with plantain and yam. Back to Amen, she finishes her errands in town and goes to Gros-Morne Hill, where she sees the blood staining the sea water. She cries for her dead lover and mourns for him with a song. She returns home and sits on a low chair behind her house, where she begins to sing to Bablassen and sink into the ground. Johnny sees his sister slowly sinking along with the chair and alerts his parents, but his father does not believe it. Johnny returns to check on his sister and she is still sinking, which their father still does not believe. After a third time, their father wants to beat the boy for lying, but the mother wishes to believe him and follows him to the back of the house. To their horror, only a plait of her hair remains above ground, which they try to pluck, but it remains in her father's hand. The couple cry for their daughter's loss. Time passes, the couple grows old and their son dies. As for Amen, she sinks below ground and meets Bablassen under the sea. Now reunited with her lover, they both move out to Port-au-Prince, to a two-story house. The couple wanders off and live by begging for alms. They eventually come across Bablassen's house. Bablassen himself recognizes his parents-in-law, who do not recognize him, and gives fifty centimes and a loaf for the man and a gourd and two loaves for the woman. Amen comes to talk to her parents and asks if they recognize her. She reveals she is their daughter, Amen, who found Bablassen, married him and became rich. Her mother hugs her daughter, and Amen welcomes her parents, then gives them nicer clothes and a good house.

==== Venezuela ====
Folklorist Harold Courlander published an Afro-Venezuelan tale titled The Swordfish: a couple live with her two children, a boy and a girl, in a ranch, and the children are sent to gather firewood. One day, the girl stays by a pond and sings a song to a fish, a swordfish, in the pond, calling it her "maridito" ('little husband'). The fish reacts to her song, comes to the surface and says it arrived. The girl's little brother, however, finds her near the pond and the girl explains she is going to marry the fish. These meetings go on for the next years, and the little brother has not mentioned anything since that first meeting. One day, however, their father begins to suspect something about his daughter's prolonged stays in the forest and questions his son, who spills the secret. The following day, the parents follow their children into the forest and spy on the girl summoning the fish with her verses. After she leaves, the girl's parents try to summon the fish by singing the same song: the father is unsuccessful, due to his deep voice, but the mother does it. The fish is tricked by the parents' deception and comes up to the surface; the father then kills it with a large knife and brings it home to be made into a meal, hiding the scales in their daughter's trunk. The girl returns from the forest with firewood and avoids eating any food with her parents, then goes to her room. When she opens up the trunk, she sees the fish scales and realizes her lover is dead, so she rushes to the pond to check on it, and finds it dried up. She throws the fish scales on the pond and cries. Later, the girl's parents cannot find her, and go to the pond, finding only her hair sticking out of the ground, which they try to pull out.

=== Africa ===
Missionary and Africanist Jakob Spieth collected a tale from the Ewe people with the Ewe title Gli dze Seḥle dzi, which he translated as Die Fabel von der Seḥle ("The Fable about Seḥle"). In this tale, a couple have two daughters, the elder named Seḥle and very beautiful, but she rejected many suitors. One day, however, she goes to the well and sees a fish transform into a man, then proposing marriage to the girl. Seḥle agrees and tells her mother, who also consents to their marriage. As such, the girl goes to the well and summons with some verses her fish lover, whom she refers as "adeġe" (Spieth explained it means 'catfish'). The fish comes out of the water, eats some food Seḥle prepared for him and goes back to the well. This goes on for days. One day, however, Seḥle asks her younger sister to cook food for her husband, while Seḥle herself is busy washing some clothes in the stream. Seḥle's younger sister takes her father to the well and summons the fish; their father kills the fish with a rifle and takes the dead body home for his wife to prepare a meal with it. Back to Seḥle, she goes home and asks her sister if she made food for her brother-in-law. The little girl confirms, but Seḥle senses something wrong and takes the food for her husband by the well. She tries to summon the fish many times, but it does not appear. Seḥle returns home and begins to sink into the ground. Seḥle's sister begins to sing to her parents that Seḥle is sinking, but they pay no heed of it, until they notice a faint song and decide to check on Seḥle: they find the girl has sunk down to the ground, and only some hairs are visible. The parents try to pull her out of the ground, but can only tear some tufts of hair that remain in their hands.

== Adaptations ==
Author Mimi Barthélémy published a bilingual book (French and Haitian Creole) about the story, titled Tezen, pwanson d'lo dous or Tézin, le poisson d'eau douce ("Tézin, the freshwater fish").

== See also ==
- Egle the Queen of Serpents
- Fish in culture
- The Lake Beetle as Groom
- Merman
