= Eglė the Queen of Serpents =

Lithuanian folktale

Eglė, the Queen of Serpents

Folk tale
- Name: Eglė, the Queen of Serpents
- Aarne–Thompson grouping: ATU 425M, "The Snake as Bridegroom"
- Region: Lithuania, Latvia, Baltic Countries
- Related: The Lake Beetle as Groom

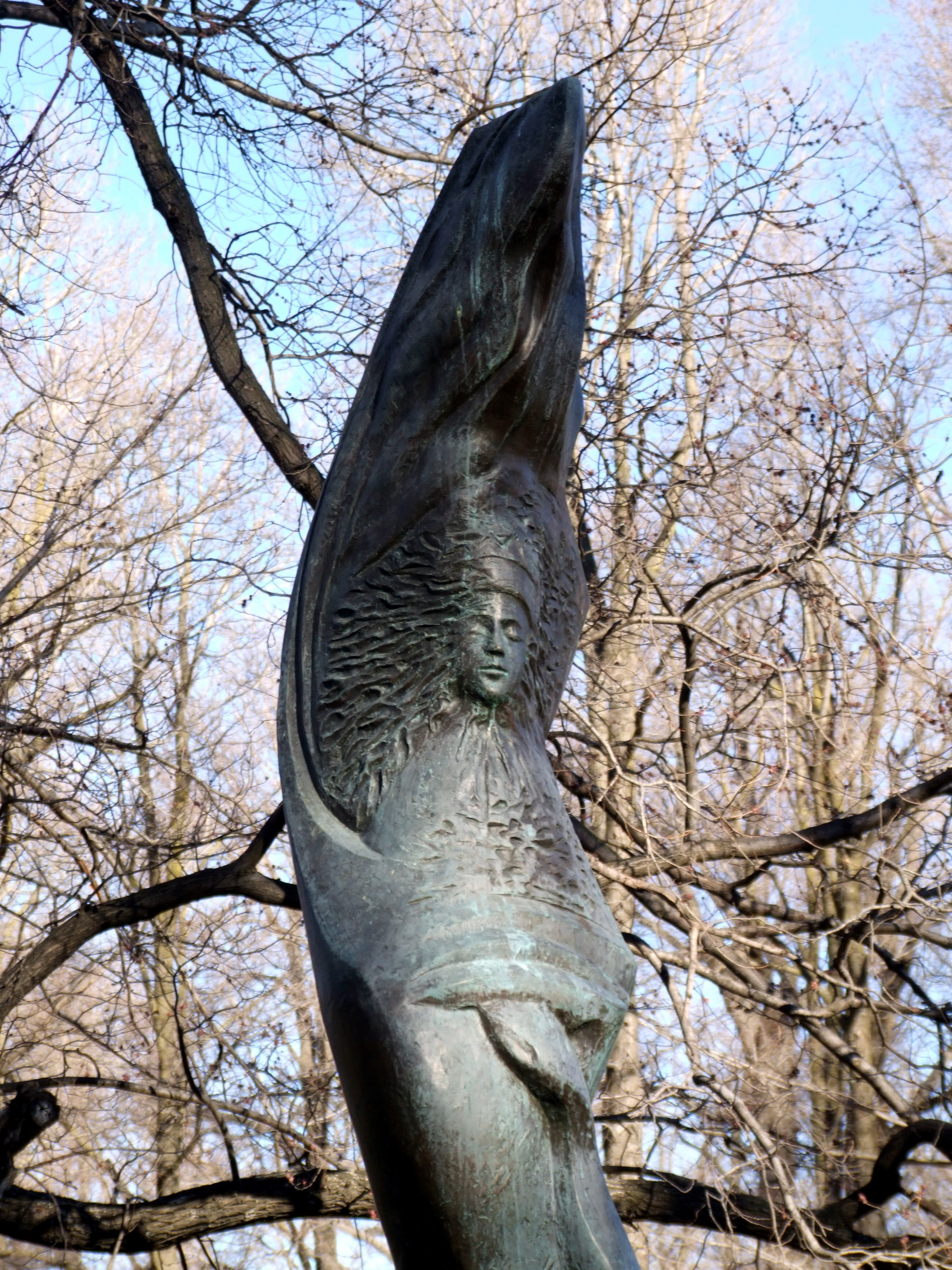
Eglė the Queen of Serpents, statue in Glebe Park, Canberra

Eglė the Queen of Serpents, alternatively Eglė the Queen of Grass Snakes (Lithuanian: Eglė žalčių karalienė), is a Lithuanian folk tale, first published was a translation by M. Jasevičius in 1837.

Eglė the Queen of Serpents is one of the best-known Lithuanian folk tales, with many references to Baltic mythology. Over a hundred slightly diverging versions of the plot have been collected. Its mythological background has been an interest of Lithuanian and foreign researchers of Indo-European mythology; Gintaras Beresnevičius considered it being a Lithuanian theogonic myth. The tale features not only human–reptile shapeshifting, but irreversible human–tree shapeshifting as well. Numerology is also evident in the tale, such as twelve sons, three daughters, three days, three tricks, three weeks of feast, nine years under the oath of marriage, three tasks given to Eglė by her husband to fulfill and nine days of visits.

== Published sources ==
The tale first appeared in print in 1837, when a translation by M. Jasevičius from Lithuanian into Polish was published in the literary collection Biruta in Vilnius. The tale was also collected by Polish writer Józef Ignacy Kraszewski and published in his historical work Litwa.

== Etymology ==
Eglė is a popular female name in Lithuania. It is also a noun meaning tree species spruce (Latin: Picea) and fir, (Note: One pharmacist source glosses Eglė as "fir" and aglė as spruce. Linguist Aleksander Brückner, Litu-slavische Studien, p. 43, discusses these as regional e→a vowel shifts, glossing them as 'fir' (German: Tanne) and notes Lettish egle which can mean ether 'fir, spruce'.) with cognates in other Baltic languages: Latvian egle 'spruce, fir', and Old Prussian addle 'spruce, fir'.

One of the main characters in this fairy tale is a grass snake (Lithuanian: žaltys), but because it seems to inhabit the sea-adjacent lagoon (Lithuanian: marios), the word may actually refer either to a mythical aquatic snake or a European eel (Anguilla anguilla).

== Synopsis ==
The story can be subdivided into a number of sections each having parallels with motifs of other folk tales, yet a combination of them is unique.

While bathing in a lake with her two sisters, a young maiden named Eglė discovers a grass snake coiled around the sleeve of her blouse. (Note: Martinkus (1989), pp. 34–35, Parag. 3. Lithuanian: ežerėlis. French: lac) The snake demands that Eglė pledge herself to him for the return of her clothing; Eglė relents and agrees to marry him.

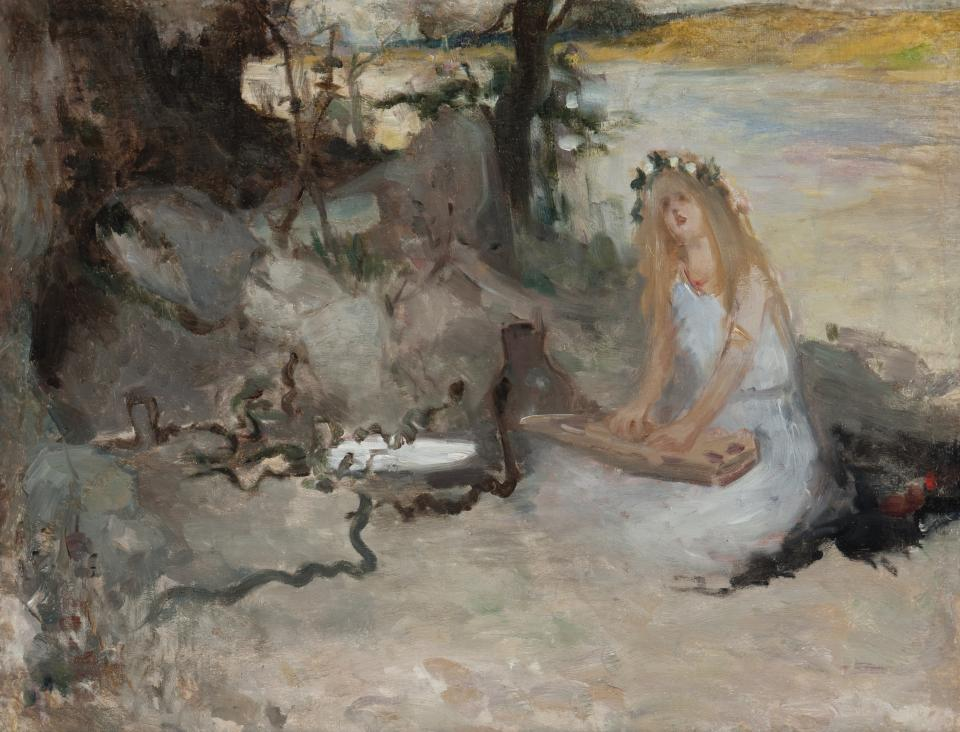
Kazimieras Stabrauskas, Eglė žalčių karalienė (Eglė, Queen of the Serpents), 1900

=== Faked brides ===
After three days, thousands of grass snakes arrive at her parents' house. In one version, the parents yield their daughter right away, frightened by the teeming serpents. In other embellished versions, the parents trick the serpents by giving up substitutes three, sometimes four times: a domesticated goose, a sheep and then a cow, then her oldest sister. (Note: Or sister named Auksė, meaning "Gold".) (Note: M. M. Coleman, after summary of "Egle and Żaltis" by Polish novelist Józef Ignacy Kraszewski.) (Note: L. W. Vallee summarizing "Eglė and Žaltis" after Erazm Majewski quoting Kraszewski.) However, each time the serpents slither away with one these "brides" they are alerted by the cuckoo to the trick being played upon them. The enraged grass snakes return one final time and threaten a calamity such as burning down the parents' house, a crop-killing drought, or a famine. Afraid of misfortune, the parents surrender the real bride, Eglė, and give her away to the serpent king of the sea.

=== To the sea palace ===
At the seashore, Eglė is welcomed by a handsome man, who identifies himself as Žilvinas, the snake from earlier. Žilvinas the Grass Snake Prince takes her to his palace under the sea, via a route starting from a nearby island and entering an underground tunnel. Eglė bears four children, three sons (Ąžuolas (Oak), Uosis (Ash) and Beržas (Birch) and one youngest daughter Drebulė (Aspen). They live happily for 9 years (or 5 years, etc.) and Eglė nearly forgets her homeland until being questioned by her oldest son Ąžuolas about her parents. Upon remembering her life before, she becomes homesick and begs her husband Žilvinas to let her visit her family aboveground. However, Žilvinas denies her permission to visit her hometown, unless Eglė can fulfill three impossible tasks.

=== Three difficult tasks ===
The three tasks are: spinning into thread a never-diminishing, enchanted (Note: Martinkus (1989), pp. 36–37, Lithuanian: užkerėtas. French: ensorcelée.) tow (Note: Lithuanian: kuodelį<kuodelid. "bunch or roller of flax, tow, or wool for spinning". A clump of fiber enough to wind a distaff. French: quenouillée.) of silk (or a "spindle of silk"), wearing down a pair of iron shoes, (Note: Lithuanian: "geležines kurpes".) and baking a "cake" (Note: Lithuanian: kiškio pyragas, lit. "hare's pie/pastry" but rendered as 'brioche'.) without vessels or utensils.

With advice from a sorceress (Note: Lithuanian: burtininkė; a potential referral to the Lady of the Sea or Lady of the Cave..) she succeeds in completing these three tasks. Throwing the clump of silk into the fire causes the appearance of the toad (Note: Martinkus (1989), pp. 36–37 Lithuanian: pamatinę < pamatas "foundation, basis", and n3 in French: "(crapaud qui habite) sous les fondations".) living in the foundations of the building which was the original provider of the silken tow. The enchantment having been revoked by the magical toad, the heroine is finally able to complete the spinning task. The iron clogs she takes to a blacksmith to have them annealed, thus softening them so they will wear down. Placing leaven (starter dough) (Note: Lithuanian: raugu/raugas; French: levain.) on the sieve turned it into a makeshift liquid holder.

=== Murder of the King ===
With the tasks completed, Žilvinas reluctantly lets Eglė and the children go. Prior to their departure, he instructs them how to call him from the depths of the sea and asks not to tell this secret to anyone else.

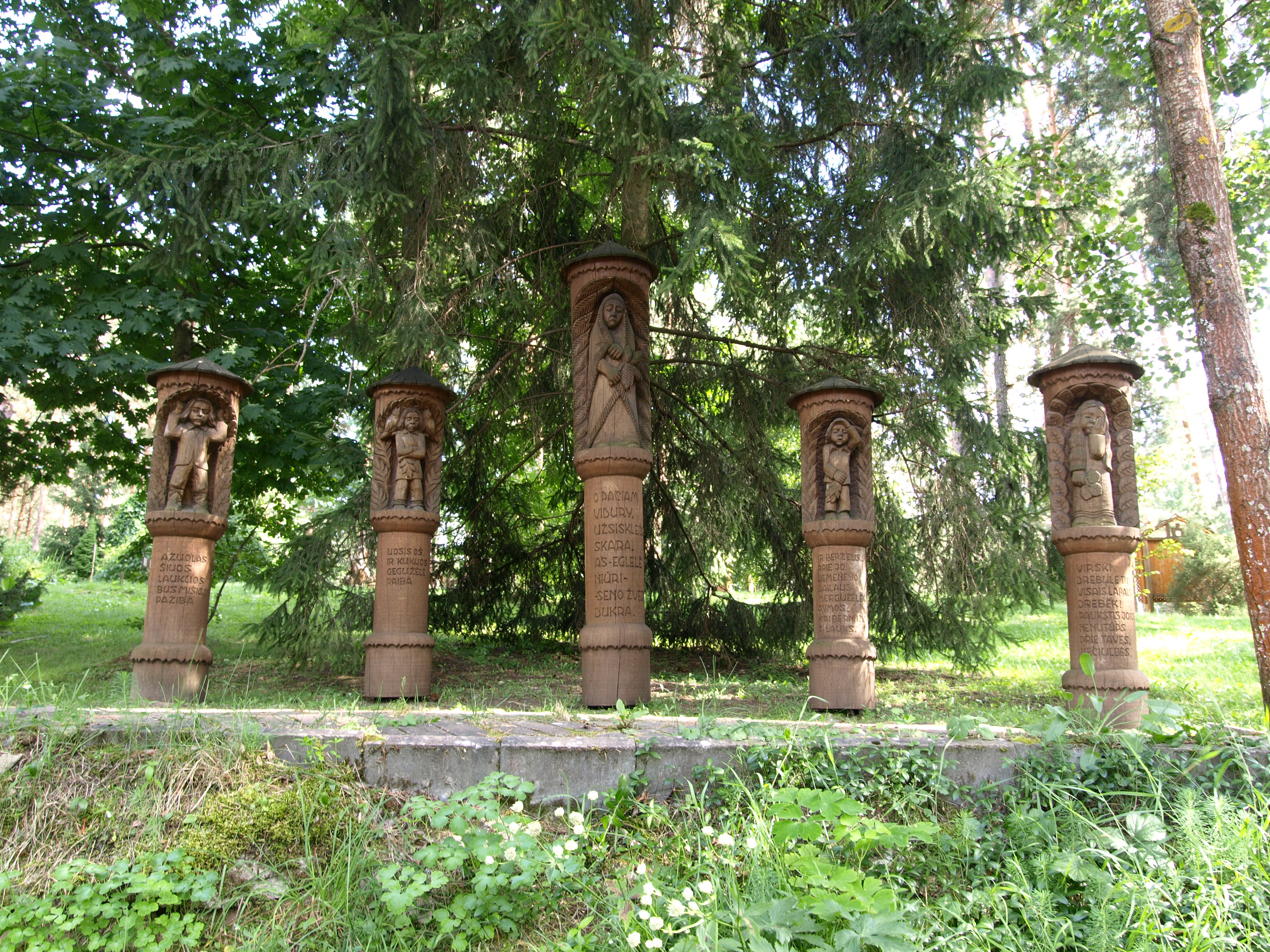
Wooden statues of Egle and her children in Druskininkai "Forest Echo" museum

After meeting the long lost family member, Eglė's relatives do not wish to let her return to the sea and decide to kill Žilvinas. First, his sons are threatened and beaten with the scourge by their uncles, in attempt to make them disclose how to summon their father; however, they remain silent and do not betray him. Finally, a frightened daughter reveals the summoning chant:

"Žilvinas, dear Žilvinėlis,
If (you're) alive – may the sea foam milk
If (you're) dead – may the sea foam blood…" (Note: Limburgish: "Žilvine, Žilvinėli! Jei tu gyvas, pieno puta. Jei negyvas, kraujo puta".)

When the serpent king Žilvinas arrives from the sea, all twelve brothers (Note: Lithuanian: "dvylika broliu") of Eglė take the scythe. (Note: Lithuanian: "dalgius") and cut him into pieces. They do not say a word to their sister about the horrible crime. After nine days, (Note: "devynios dienos") Eglė arrives at the seashore and calls her husband, but unfortunately only the foam of blood returns from the sea. When Eglė hears her dead husband's voice and discovers how her beloved has died, as a punishment for betrayal she whispers an enchantment, which turns her fragile, fearful daughter into a quaking aspen. She then turns her sons into sturdy trees - an oak, an ash and a birch. Finally, Eglė herself turns into a spruce (or fir).

The names of the characters reflect the type of trees they turn into: Eglė means spruce or fir; her sons Ąžuolas ("oak"), Beržas ("birch"), Uosis ("ash"); and the daughter Drebulė ("aspen," poplar genus).

== Translations ==
The tale has been translated by Irina Zheleznova (1974) as Spruce, Queen of the Grass Snakes. Hungarian scholar Endre Bójtar called it Egle (Silver Pine), the Snake Goddess and Egle (Silver Fir), the Snake Queen.

The tale was translated into German as Egle, die Schlangenkönigin by German professor Carl Cappeller in his book of Lithuanian folktales, and as Das Weib des Schlangenmannes ("The Wife of the Snake-Man"), which was published in Mitteilungen der Litauischen literarischen Gesellschaft.

== Analysis ==
=== In folkloristics ===
This tale is classified, in the Aarne–Thompson–Uther Index, as tale type ATU 425M, "The Snake as Bridegroom" (formerly "Bathing Girl's garments kept [until promise of marriage with aquatic being]"), of which the Lithuanian version (Note: Uther under ATU 425M lists both current and old English titles, and indicates a Lithuanian version of Kerbelytė (1999)) is recorded in 120 variants according to Bronislava Kerbelytė (cf. § Lithuania). (Note: Kerbelytė (1999) apud Macijauskaitė-Bonda (2023), p. 259.)

These tales are closely connected to type ATU 425 ("Search for the Lost Husband"), ATU 425A ("Animal as Bridegroom"), ATU 425B ("Cupid and Psyche" or "Son of the Witch") and ATU 425C ("Beauty and the Beast"). As such, some versions avert the tragic ending by following the narrative of other tale types, like ATU 425A and ATU 425C. According to Stith Thompson's reworked folktale classification, tale type AaTh 425M involves a magical formula or incantation to summon the serpent husband. This formula is learned by others, who draw the serpentine being out of its hideout to kill it. In this vein, in his study, Swedish scholar Jan-Öjvind Swahn noted that, in Lithuanian and Latvian variants, the formula is "unitarily formed", which is later learned by the snake husband's brothers-in-law via the youngest child.

==== In Lithuanian scholarship ====
The tale is one of the most researched in Lithuanian scholarship, under different approaches, (Note: At least 12 different approaches are reported.) since "it represents the old Lithuanian worldview". (Note: Šlekonytė, (2015): "Tyrimo objektu dažniausiai pasirenkama pasaka „Eglė žalčių karalienė“ (ATU 425M). (...) Tai naratyvas, kuris reprezentuoja senąją lietuvių pasaulėžiūrą ir kiekvienas jo tyrimas yra savaip vertingas")

The tale has become the object of scholarly interest of ethnologist Jonas Balys. In his analysis of Lithuanian folktales (published in 1936), he previously classified the tale as 425D*, Žalčio žmona ("The Girl as Wife to a Snake"), with 27 variants reported until then.

The story has also been considered an oikotype, i.e., a form of the tale that is specific to a certain region (in this case, the Baltic geographical area).

Folklorist Norbertas Vėlius has also developed an academic interest in the narrative and analysed its elements ("the dual nature of Eglė, the attributes of the snake, the types of plants") in relation to the folklore of other countries.

=== Motifs ===
==== The serpent husband ====
According to Jan-Öjvind Swahn, a "traditional feature" of the tale type is that the supernatural husband lives under water. In this regard, in another version of the tale, the king of snakes is named Žaltys, and husband and human wife live in his palace at the bottom of the sea. The name of the serpent husband may also vary between tellings: Žilvinas, Zilvynas, Zelvynas, or Žilvytis.

Researcher Galina Kabakova cites that most variants feature a serpent husband: a snake, a boa, a winged serpent, even a Hydra-like dragon. In other variants, he is identified as the king of snakes or the spirit of the waters who lives in an underwater palace located in a lake, a river or a lagoon.

Scholar Jack Zipes provided another description of the tale type, wherein, besides the serpent, a seal, a dragon or sea monster may steal the clothes of the bathing maiden.

In one version, the king of the grass snakes was wearing an amber crown, while in a Latvian version, he lived in an amber palace - a motif that recalls another Baltic fairy tale: Jūratė and Kastytis.

==== The children's transformation ====
In another version of the tale, the story ends with the transformation of the heroines's four children and herself into trees: her into a pine tree, her sons into an oak, an ash, and a birch, and her daughter into a weeping willow. Other variations lie in the secret code the wife learns from her snake husband, and in the fate of the heroine and their children (sometimes all girls; sometimes all boys): they are either transformed into trees or into birds and disappear forever. In Swahn's monograph, he considered the bird transformation in other texts to be a "variation" on the motif of the tree transformation. Elena Bradūnas considered that the children's tree transformation was a "typical element" of the conclusion of the Baltic variants of type ATU 425M, and that the arboreal transformation was "typically Baltic."

==== The human–animal relationship ====
The main storyline (marriage of human woman with snake that steals her clothing) is said to belong to a mythological background about snakes that may be very archaic to the European continent. It is also said that the ancient Lithuanians revered the grass snake (žaltys). Under this lens, the grass snake could be seen as a totemic ancestor, akin to the swan maiden, who plays the role of ancestress of many peoples.

According to Bernard Sergent, "human–animal marriage is a union that is too remote as incest is a too close one. Compared to a balanced marriage, between humans but from another clan or another village, that is to say–depending on the society–within the framework of a well measured endogamy or exogamy, incest transgresses the norm because it is an exaggerated endogamy, and animal marriage transgresses it because it is an exaggerated exogamy."

Lithuanian scholarship seems to agree with this assessment: the snake is the ruler of waters and represents a chaotic world. Its liaison with a human woman, which produces children, violates the boundaries between the world of land and the world of water and, by killing the snake, the natural order (that is, separation between land and water) can be restored. By using the magical incantation to summon the snake bridegroom, Egle builds a bridge between her world and the aquatic one (or an underground, chthonic realm).

Other interpretations focus on the intergroup marriage aspect of the story: Egle's family (brothers) would then represent male relatives fighting against a male from another family or clan to rescue their only sister, by torturing their nephews and niece (the fruits of this "spurious" union). Balticist Mykolas Letas Palmaitis, citing Kerbelytė(1987) and Meletinsky, described the tragic fate of Egle's family as consequence of tribalism: her brothers kill the 'animal' husband because he belongs to another tribe or group, and, for bearing his sons, Egle and her children must also disappear.

Another view, espoused by scholar Eugenijus Žmuida, is that the tale harks back to a myth about a maiden offered as the bride to a snake (who represents a deity of waters). At first, she is hesitant and afraid, but relents and, after seeing that the snake can change into a handsome man, accepts him wholeheartedly. Žmuida also suggests that tales that lack family drama and friction might be the original forms of the story.

=== Possible antiquity ===
Jan-Öjvind Swahn considered that tale type 425M was in fact a folk legend of possible "great age" that Latvians and Lithuanians have retained.

The tale about a snake spouse is also considered by Russian scholarship to be a "common Slavic" or "pan-Slavic" fairy tale, with possible Indo-European origins. Another line of scholarship states that the tale refers to an ancient "Balto-Slavic totemic myth".

A quantitative study, published by folklorist Sara Graça da Silva and anthropologist Jamshid J. Tehrani in 2016, seemed to indicate that the tale type shows a certain antiquity: based on a phylogenetic model, both researchers estimated that the ATU 425M type belongs to an "ancestral tale corpora" of the Balto-Slavic languages.

Although its ultimate time and place of origin cannot be settled with certainty, the Lithuanian myth has been compared with similar stories found among Native American peoples (Wayampi, Yahgan and Coos), which could be the result of an inherited Ancient North Eurasian motif featuring a woman marrying an aquatic animal, violating human laws on exogamy and connecting the terrestrial and aquatic worlds.

== Variants ==
Although it can be considered a tale type developed in the Baltic area, since most of the variants have been recorded there, (Note: A similar assessment was made by professor Jack V. Haney, to whom the tale type appears "only around the south Baltic coast".) variants are reported by scholar Leonardas Sauka to have been collected in nearby countries: 23 variants in Estonia (near Lake Peipus); 150 Lithuanian versions; 89 Latvian versions; 28 from Russia; 22 from Belarus; 6 in Ukraine; 3 from Poland; 2 from Bulgaria. Variants have also been found from Tatar (4 tales) and Kazakh (1 version) sources. Altogether, the variants collected outside Lithuania and Latvia, from 11 countries, amount to 106 versions. The tale is also said to be known in Germany, Finland and among the "Cheremis" (Mari people). Similarly, according to Russian folklorist Lev Barag, despite Stith Thompson's opinion that the tale type existed in Lithuania, it was also reported among East Slavs (in Ukraine, Russia and Belarus), in Poland, Bulgaria, and in Latvia and Estonia.

According to researcher Galina Kabakova, the fate of the children at the end of the tale is important to determine the origin of that particular variant (based on a geographical method): in the main Lithuanian versions, mother and children are transformed into trees, a motif that occurs in versions collected from the Belarus's border between Poland and Lithuania, and in Russian versions collected in Lithuania. On the other hand, if the tale ends with the transformation of the family into birds or reptiles, it is a tale from East Slavic origin.

=== Baltic region ===
The tale type is recognized as being "most at home in the Balto-Slavic regions".

==== Lithuania ====
120 variants are counted according to Kerbelytė's data. According to scholar Norbertas Vėlius, the tale is "more common" in the eastern area of Lithuania, where "more than two thirds" of the variants have been collected. Variants collected at East Lithuania show the transformation of the children into birds. Note some think the bird variant tend to occur in Latvia.

Following a less mythological approach, scholar Endre Bójtar suggested that its diffusion across Lithuania owes to the local snake cult, recorded in historical sources.

In a Lithuanian variant, Das Mädchen und die Schlange ("The Girl and the Snake"), a widow lives with her daughter in a house at the beach. One day, the girl is sent to wash some clothes at the beach when a wave crashes and carries them away. The girl begins to cry, but a voice tells her it will return the clothes if she becomes the voice's wife. She accepts it and goes back home. That evening, a giant snake comes out of the sea and knocks at the girl's door. She opens the door and answers to the snake's wishes: to be given food and to sleep next to her in her bed. The next day, the snake asks her to prepare the oven and to throw it in the fire. The girl obeys and a human prince appears. He explains she disenchanted him and he will make her his wife as the "Queen of the Seas" ("du wirst fortan Königin des Meeres sein"), in his palace in the middle of the sea.

In a Lithuanian tale translated to German with the title Die Schlange Weißhaut ("The Snake Whiteskin"), an old couple have three daughters and a son, and one day leave their children home while they go on a trip. After they leave, the girls go to pluck some flowers by the river and decide to enter the warm water for a bath. The girls leave their clothes on the shore and return to fetch, but the youngest girl finds a snake on hers. The snake promises to return the garments in case she promises to marry him, which she does. They return home and the girls tell their parents of the event. Years later, the snake himself prepares to fetch his bride and slithers from the lake. He sees a crow atop a tree and promises to reward the bird. The snake knocks on the human family's door and explains he is after his bride. The old parents try to trick the snake with a chicken, a sheep, a pig, a barrel and a pestle, but the crow alerts the snake about the deceit. Finally, the snake takes his bride and rewards the crow with a juostas and a kerchief. In the snake's house, the snake gives his bride iron shoes and a spinning wheel mixed with twigs, iron filings and wood splinters for her to wear down and untangle, respectively, before she can even visit her family again. She tries to do her tasks for years, as her husband told her, but cannot do so, and cries, when a woman neighbour offers her help and advises her how to perform the task: toss the shoes in an oven and let them heat up, and shake the wheel to remove the twigs and everything else and toss them in the oven to burn, then strike the hot iron shoes until they are thin enough. She does as instructed and shows her husband she has succeeded, then takes her back home six years after their marriage, and teaches her a magic command to open up the path back home. The girl returns home with two sons and a daughter and visits her old parents. The following days, the girl's only brother tries to bribe and threatens his nephews to reveal the secret command, but the boys refuse, save for their younger sister, who tells everything. The brother goes to the lake shore, summons the snake brother-in-law, called Whiteskin, and beheads him. Back home, the snake's bride is ready to leave, but her brother, father, mother and sister try to delay her by insisting she stays with them. She answers she would transform her elder son into an oak, the middle son into an ash tree, the younger daughter into an elm, and herself into a cuckoo. After leaving, she goes to the lake margin and tries to summon her husband Whiteskin, but the water foams blood, instead of milk, thus proving her husband is dead. Thus, the girl transforms her elder son into an oak, the middle son into an ash tree, the younger daughter into an elm, and herself into a cuckoo.

==== Latvia ====
In Latvia the tale is known as Žalčio nuotaka or Zalkša līgava ("The Grass-Snake's Wife"). According to the Latvian Folktale Catalogue, the heroine curses her sons to become trees and herself to become a cuckoo.

In a Latvian tale, translated into Russian as "Невеста ужа" ("The Bride of the Snake") and into English as The Sea Snake's Bride, three girls run to the beach to play in the water. The third girl leaves the water and searches for her clothes, only to find a snake lying on top of them. The snake makes the girl give her ring in exchange for the garments, and slithers back into the water. Three weeks later, the snake comes to get his bride in a grand golden carriage. Her family tries to trick him twice, first with a goose, then with a she-goat. The third time, he gets his bride and takes her to his underwater kingdom. The next two years, her mother goes to the sea shore and asks about her daughter. A toad and a crab jump out of the water to tell the woman the girl is doing fine. On the third year, the girl herself visits her family with her children, then returns to the water.

In another tale, Das Schloß des Meereskönigs or "Дворец морского царя" ("The Palace of the Sea King"), the son of the Sea King gets curious about the land above the sea and decides to visit it. One day, he meets a despondent fisherman on the shore, who laments to the sea prince that he has not caught any fishes. The sea prince tells he will help him, on the condition that the fisherman gives him the first thing that is on the shore (which happens to be the fisherman's only daughter). The girl is wreathing a flower garland that is swept off by the wind and falls on the sea. The sea prince takes her to his kingdom, marries her and she gives birth to two boys. Years pass, and the girl is missing life on the land. Her husband agrees to let her up on the shore, but she has to eat a loaf of bread (that does not diminish) and wear out a pair of shoes (that do not wear out). A little bird gives her a clue on how to fulfill both tasks and she tricks her husband. The girl visits her family, but her brothers consult with a nearby witch, who reveals the sons know how to summon their father. The girl's brothers torture their nephews in the bath house and they tell their uncles the secret command. The uncles go to the beach, summon the sea prince and kill him with spears. When the girl goes to the shore to return to her husband, she summons him and sees his head floating in the water. Her sons change into water and she returns to her human family.

In a Latvian tale from Ansis Lerhis-Puškaitis's (lv) collection, from Jelgava, translated to German as Wie der Kuckuck entstand ("How the Cuckoo Originated") and to Hungarian with the title Hogyan lett a kakukk? ("How did the cuckoo appear?"), a mother finds a louse in her house, fattens it and make a pair of shoes for her daughter. Her suitors are to discover what material the shoes are made of (tale type AaTh 621, "The Louseskin"). A water snake (a crested newt, in the original) announces it is a louseskin and marries the girl, taking her to its underwater palace. After some years, the girl wants to visit her human family, but the water snake sets a task: to wear down some pairs of iron shoes. She does and takes her three children with her. At the end of the tale, when she discovers the dead husband, she commands the elder son to become an oak, the middle child, a girl, to be a linden tree; the youngest into another tree; and herself into a cuckoo, to ever sigh over her lost love.

=== Finnic languages ===
==== Estonia ====
Tale type ATU 425M is also reported in Estonia, with the title Ussi naine ("The Snake's Wife"). A primary analysis by Estonian folklorist Richard Viidalepp indicated 19 Estonian variants. However, in a later study by Estonian folklorists (who worked in conjunction with the Lithuanians), the Estonian archives registered 34 variants of the tale type. Geographically, the tale type is particularly reported from eastern and southern Estonia, "especially in the Setu region", where 9 texts have been recorded. Some variants begin with type AaTh 621, with the louseskin riddle, and, at the end of the tale, the serpent's wife becomes a birch or aspen and her children turn into bark or leaves.

In an Estonian tale titled Ussi naine or Ussi naene ("The Snake's Wife"), the maiden bathes with her sisters by the sea, the snake refuses to return her clothes, the heroine gives birth to daughters that become different tree species at the end of the tale.

In an Estonian tale translated to German as Die Schuhe der Prinzessin ("The Shoes of the Princess") and to Hungarian as A királylány bocskora ("The Princess's Footwear"), a king prepares two shoes, one made from louseskin, the other from flea skin. He sets a riddle for any suitors: whoever guesses the right material of the footwear, shall marry the princess. Human suitors test their skills. A snake slithers from beneath the well, goes to the king's court, and guesses the right answer. The princess is given to the snake as wife and goes with the animal to its home. The princess bears the snake man three daughters and goes to visit her family. Back to her castle, the princess's brothers express their distaste about their snake brother-in-law, and question their nieces about their home life. The youngest child reveals how they reach their house: their mother goes to the edge of a lake, sings a song and the snake father appears in a boat. The brothers go to the lake, summon the snake with the song and kill him as soon as he appears. Some time later, the princess takes her daughters and prepares to return home by summoning her snake husband, the boat appears dirtied with her husband's blood. The princess asks which of her daughters spilled the secret song (the youngest), and curses herself to become a birch tree, and her daughters to turn into parts of the tree (foliage, tree bark and membrane).

In an Estonian tale published by folklorist Oskar Loorits with the title Die Schlangenbraut ("The Snake's Bride"), a mother consults with a wise man the fate of her daughters: her two elders shall marry later, but the youngest shall soon meet her intended mate, a snake. Meanwhile, the girls are bathing in the lake. When they leave to get her clothes, the youngest finds a snake on her garments, which promises to return them if she becomes his wife. She agrees to his proposal and the snake comes later to take her to his underground palace. Years into their marriage, the snake takes off the snakeskin to become a man, and they have three daughters. One day, their daughters wish to visit their grandparents. The snake father allows them to go back to land and teaches his wife a song to open a passage back to mainland. Before they enter her parents' house, the girl warns her daughters to keep quiet about their life. The grandfather asks his grandchildren about where they live; the youngest girl tells him about the snake husband and the magical song. The grandfather goes to the lake with a rifle, summons the snake and shoots him. The next day, the girl and her daughters go back to the lake. She summons her husband three times, but he does not respond. Sensing something wrong, she inquires her daughters about it: the youngest confesses. The girl begins to cry and becomes a birch tree, her two elder daughters birch bark and the youngest a trembling leaf.

In a tale from the Lutsi Estonians collected by linguist Oskar Kallas with the name Ussiks nõiutud mees (German: Der in eine Schlange verwandelte Mann; English: "The Man Enchanted to be a Snake"), a couple prays for a son, and God gives them a snake. When the snake is older, he goes to a neighbour to court his daughters. He marries the elder in church. During the wedding festivities, the snake climbs onto her lap, but the girl shoos him away. On the wedding night, the snake kills her. This happens again with the middle sister. As for the youngest, she treats him with kindness and, on the wedding night, he takes off his snakeskin to become a handsome man. The man moves out of his parents' home with his wife to an island in the middle of the sea. They live together and have three sons. One day, the man's wife wants to visit her brothers, and the man teaches her a magic command to move from the island to the continent, while also warning her not to tell anything of their life to her brothers. She takes her sons to visit her brothers, and the brothers pry the children for anything. The youngest son reveals the secret command to his uncles. The uncles go to the beach, sing the song to summon the snake man and kill him. The man's wife goes to the beach and repeats the song to summon her husband, but he does not appear. She then questions her sons if any of them told anything about the secret song, and the youngest answers that he did. Crying, the girl becomes a birch near the shore, while her children become trees.

German scholar Oskar Dähnhardt collected an untitled Estonian tale: a king has a daughter and three sons. One day, the princess finds a louse in her father's hair, who decides to fatten the bug and use its hide as part of a suitor riddle: whoever guesses the nature of the hide shall marry the princess. A large snake comes to the castle and guesses it right, then takes the princess with him as his bride to his abode in the sea. To the princess's surprise, the snake becomes a man at night, and after a year she gives birth to a son. The girl wishes to go back home to show her father the child, and, despite some reservations, the snake husband allows her to pay him a visit, by teaching a spell to access her watery home. Back to the castle, she spends some time with her brothers, who insist to know how their sister can return to the snake's home. After much insistence, the brothers learn of the secret command and go to the seashore. The two elder brothers try to summon the snake brother-in-law, but he recognizes their voices do not belong to his wife. However, the princess's younger brother mimics her voice and tricks the snake into coming out of the water, only to be beheaded by the princess's brothers. Some time later, the princess and her child come to the seashore and try to call out to the snake husband, to no avail, so the princess turns into a Maserbirke (a type of birch tree) and her son into a duck.

In a Seto tale collected by Estonian folklorist Ello Kirss Säärits from teller Maarja Kink, a king's daughter wears shoes made of fleaskin, and her father sets a challenge: whoever guesses the right material her shoes are made of shall have her for wife. One day, the princess is getting something in the castle's basement, when a snake appears and coils around her, trying to force the answers out of her. Fearing for her life, she tells the snake her shoes are made of fleaskin. The snake releases her. Later, many suitors come to the castle to make merry and try their hand at guessing, but the snake appears with the right answer and takes the princess with him as his bride. The snake takes the princess to a lake, they sail in a boat to an island and enter a castle filled with food and drinks. When they go to bed, the snake becomes a handsome youth at night, then goes back to being a snake in the morning. In time, the snake teaches the princess a secret command to call upon him from the island. Years later, the couple has two children, a boy and a girl, and the princess wishes to visit her human family, which the snake allows. The princess takes her children to meet her human family, and the princess's brother asks his nephew about their journey. The boy reveals the secret command to his uncle, who goes to the beach and summons the snake brother-in-law. The snake appears with the boat and the princess's brother shoots him with a gun, then returns home. Later, the princess takes her two children to the beach and calls upon her husband, to no avail. The princess's brothers invite her to come back to their father's castle, but the girl denounces them as her husband's murderers. She then turns her daughter into a birch, her son into a pine tree, and throws herself into the sea. Thus, the birch is a female tree and the pine a male tree.

==== Finland ====
Tale type 425M is known in Finland as Uuza Vedenkuningas ("Uuza the King of Waters"), according to the Finnish Folktale Catalogue, established by scholar Pirkko-Liisa Rausmaa. Rausmaa also stated that the tale type was rare ("Harvinaisesta", in the original) in Finland, with its four variants collected from Ingria (Finnish: Inkeri).

Author August von Löwis of Menar collected a variant from the village of Voloitsa (Valyanitsy), on the Soikino peninsula. In this tale, titled Wie die Trauerbirke entstanden ist ("How the weeping birch came to be"), a rich man finds a louse on his daughter's hair, fattens it, kills it and makes a pair of shoes out of its hide. He then announces a contest to all prospective suitors: to guess the material of his daughter's shoes. A woman appears from the lake, becomes an old man and enters the court. She guesses correctly and takes the girl as daughter-in-law and wife for her son. Three years pass, and the girl has been living in a splendid underwater castle, but begins to long for home. Her husband agrees to let her visit her family with her son, teaches her a spell and give her gold to gift her family. She reaches home and spends some time there. Her brothers want to kill the underwater husband, so they leave early and wait by the lake with wooden bats. Their sister goes to the lake shore and summons her husband. As soon as he emerges from the lake, the brothers jump out of the hiding spot and beat the husband to death. The girl becomes a weeping birch and her son a tree branch.

=== Eastern Europe ===
Professor Jack V. Haney stated that variants of type 425M appear "frequently recorded among the Russians", but "less frequently by Belarusians and Ukrainians".

Galina Kabakova notes that, among the East Slavic populations, the tale type ATU 425M assumes the features of an etiological tale: as remarked by professor Natalie Kononenko, it shows the origins of the cuckoo, the lark and the nightingale. In this regard, the heroine "nearly always" becomes a cuckoo, while her son "almost always" becomes a nightingale, although the children may turn into different birds in other versions. Furthermore, in the Slavic variants, the mother-in-law is the one that kills the snake husband.

In addition, another line of Russian scholarship states that the "etiological" tale of the snake husband is "common" ('распространенной', in the original) in Polesian tradition: a girl goes to bathe in the river, a snake sits on her clothes and asks her to marry him; they marry, she lives with him in his underwater palace and bears him a son and a daughter; later, she goes to visit her mother, who learns the secret command to summon the snake husband and kills him; upon discovering her dead husband, the girl turns into a cuckoo, her son into a nightingale, and her daughter into a swallow.

==== Moldova ====
Lithuanian scholar Bronislava Kerbelytė, in a 2004 article, reported two variants in Moldova. In one sourced to Budjak, the heroine marries the serpent husband, called Osip, who becomes a man underwater, and bears him a son and a daughter; her mother kills the serpent, and she curses her daughter to become a swallow, her son into the Morning Star and herself into a cuckoo. In a tale sourced to Codrin, the heroine marries the snake and gives birth to two sons; the heroine's elder brothers summon and kill her husband, and she curses her elder son to become a well, the younger a spring, and herself into a willow.

==== Mari people ====
In a tale from the Mari people titled "Слепая любовь" ("Blind Love"), some sisters go to bathe in the water. The youngest leaves and tries to find her garments, but a snake is lying on top of them and will only return her the clothes with the promise of marriage. She marries the snake. Three years later, the girl visits her family carrying her two children in tow, a son and a daughter. Her mother learns the secret command to summon the snake husband (called Isai Isanych) and kills the husband with a scythe. The girl sees the dead husband and commands the son to become a lark and the daughter a cuckoo, while she is washed away by the waves, never to be seen again.

==== Chuvash people ====
In a tale attributed to the Chuvash people, "Про девушку и про ужа" ("About the girl and the snake"), three sisters run to the shore to play and bathe in the water. The elder two leave the lake and, take their garments and go home. When the youngest sister leaves and looks for her garments, the maiden sees a huge snake sitting on her garments. The snake promises to give it back if she marries it. She agrees; the snake returns the garments and teaches her a command to summon him, Yaku. The snake takes her to his splendid underwater palace and reveals he must suffer some time under a curse: he is human under the snakeskin. She returns home to her family with dresses and money to give her sisters, and to wait for her husband to fetch her. The snake appears in a carriage to get his bride and take her to his underwater realm. Three years pass, and the snake's human wife has given birth to a boy and a girl. She insists on visiting her parents and showing them their grandchildren, but her husband warns that disaster may loom upon their family. The girl visits her family and one of her sisters asks her what she does to return to her palace in the bottom of the lake. The girl naïvely reveals the command to her sister, who goes to the shore of the lake, summons Yaku and kills him. When the snake's human wife returns to the shore, she sees a cut off snake head floating in the lake. She then enchants her son to become a beetle, her daughter a dragonfly, and herself a cuckoo.

==== Tatar people ====
In a tale from the Tatar people titled "Зухра" ("Zuhra"), an old couple try to have a child, but none of their children survive, until they have a girl they name Zuhra. The couple keep her safe from the world, until she is fourteen years old, when some girls from the village enter the couple's house and beg for Zuhra to join them for playtime in the water. The old woman allows her daughters to join the others. Zuhra goes with the girls to bathe in a nearby lake and leaves her clothes on the shore. When she returns, a black snake ("Чёрный Змей", in the Russian translation) is lying on them and asks the girl to marry it. Afraid to utter any word, the Black Snake then assures her it will come back when she is eighteen, and slithers back into the lake. Zuhra runs back home and tells her mother everything, and they fence the house, hoping it will keep the snake out. However, when the time comes, the sky darkens and a retinue of snakes, jinns and peris come to Zuhra's house in their master's name. The Black Snake then appears and demands Zuhra as his bride. The girl agrees to come with him to the lake. The snake wraps itself around Zuhra, they both dive into the lake and swim until they reach a large gate. Past the gate, the snake uncoils itself, hits a golden staircase and becomes a human man. The man explains he was taken by the genie race when he was little, but eventually became their leader, and the girl has nothing to fear. Zuhra accepts him and they marry. Three years pass, and Zuhra begins to miss home. She convinces her husband to let her go to the surface to visit her parents, and he gives her gold and silver to gift his mother-in-law. He also teaches her a command to summon him when she returns, and makes her promise to keep it a secret. Zuhra and her children go back to the surface world and visit the grandparents. After pestering her daughter with questions, Zuhra eventually tells her the secret command. The old woman places her grandchildren to bed, and, taking a saber, goes to the lake in the dead of night to summon the Black Snake (the "padishah of the jinn"). The Black Snake slithers off to the surface, and is beheaded by the old woman. She returns home. The next morning, Zuhra says her goodbyes to her mother and goes back to the lake. She tries to summon her husband, but, realizing something is wrong, she finds the snake's body. She buries it and curses her children to become a nightingale, a swallow and a starling, while herself becomes a dove.

In a tale from the Kazan Tatars, collected by Turkologist Ignác Kúnos with the title Ajsélu, a woman has a daughter named Ajsélu who wants to bathe with her friends in the Ufer. After her friends leave the water, she goes to bathe alone and leaves her clothes on the shore. When she returns, a snake is lying on her garments and promises to return them if Ajsélu agrees to marry the animal. The girl agrees and returns home. After a week, Ajsélu and her mother are visited by a cadre of snakes that invade their house and take Ajsélu to the lake. Thinking her daughter drowned, the woman returns home. After three years, Ajsélu appears to her mother with two children in tow, a boy and a girl. Ajsélu says she is married to the Padishah of the Waters underwater, and life there is better, but her husband agreed to let her visit her family on land. The woman learns of the secret command to summon the Padishah, and insists Ajsélu spends the night there. When Ajsélu is asleep, the mother takes an axe, goes to the lake shore and summons the Padishah by calling on "Bikbau". The snake's head emerges and she beheads him. The following morning, Ajsélu takes her children and go to the edge of the lake, then tries to summon her snake husband. After a while, she notices the water is red as blood, and realizes Bikbau is dead, so she curses her son to become a swallow, her daughter to become a nightingale, and herself to become a cuckoo. Then they fly forevermore.

=== Southern Europe ===
==== Bulgaria ====
Tale type ATU 425M is reported in the Bulgarian Folktale Catalogue with the name "Невястата на змея проклина децата си" or "Die Frau des Drachen verflucht ihre Kinder" ("The Wife of the Dragon curses her children"): a dragon sits on the girl's garments in exchange for marrying her; they wed and move to his palace at the bottom of the sea, where she gives birth to two children; the girl visits her family with her children and her daughter betrays the dragon's secret, which leads to him being killed by his brothers-in-law; the girl then curses her children to become trees.

=== Central Europe ===
The tale is also said to be "very popular" in the Pomeranian region.

According to researcher Svetlana Ryzhakova, professor Vytautas Kazakevičius stated that in the Polish region of Suwałki, a legend is told of a girl named Egle or Egla who married a snake being that lived in an underwater crystal palace.

=== Central Asia ===
In a Kazakh tale titled, "Красавица Миржан и владыка подводного ханства" ("Beautiful Mirzhan and the Ruler of the Underwater Khanate"), translated as Mirzhan and the Lord of the Kingdom Under the Sea, Mirzhan, the beautiful only daughter of an old woman, is bathing in the water with some friends. Suddenly, a booming voice echoes from below the water asking the girl to marry it. The other girls flee in fear, while Mirzhan runs to the shore to get her clothes, but a snake sits on them. The snake asks the girl to be his wife and to live with him in his crystal palace. The girl accepts, if only to get her garments back. For the next week, her mother forbids her to set foot outside their yurt. However, a cadre of black snakes begins to slither out of the river to their house. The snakes take Mirzhan and disappear with her beneath the waters, as her mother grieves for her lost daughter. Some time later, as the old woman waits near the shore, she sees her daughter coming to her with two children, her sons. She explains she lives underwater and to return she only has to call on her husband's name: Ahmet. The old woman convinces her daughter to spend a night on her old home, while she goes in the dead of night to the shore to summon the snake spouse and kill him. The next morning, Mirzhan goes back to the shore to summon her husband, but she only sees a red tint in the river and her husband's head near the reeds. She then curses her daughter to become a swallow, her son a nightingale and herself into a cuckoo.

In an Uyghur tale titled Ayı Sultan ("Bear Husband"), a village is located near a forest, and villagers earn their living by fetching wood and selling it. One day, some girls go to fetch wood in the forest, among which a girl named Nazigül. When Nazigül cannot find a rope to tie her bundle, a bear suddenly appears and takes her to its den, while her companions cannot find her. In the bear's den, Nazigül wakes up and sees the bear has turned into a handsome youth, who explains he is Ahmet, son of the forest padishah and has fallen in love with the girl, bringing her to his lair to marry her. The forest padishah marries the couple, and Nazigül and Ahmet live together. Years later, Nazigül goes to visit her parents' house with her children in tow, a boy and a girl. The girl meets her parents and explains her husband, the bear, gave her three days to visit her family, then return, then tells everything about her bear husband. Later that night, after Nazigül and her children are asleep, the girl's parents go to the bear's den and kill him, then return home. After the three day period is over, Nazigül and her children return to the forest and she tries to call for her husband, but he cannot answer. She ventures further into the forest and finds her dead bear husband. Nazigül then becomes a cuckoo, her son an iron-beaked bird that protects the forest and the daughter a peregrine falcon that helps the people.

=== Africa ===
Africanist Sigrid Schmidt stated that in African tales, the secret song known only by heroine and husband and learned by others who use it to betray the couple "connects ... also with the East European tale of The Snake as Bridegroom".

Scholar Hasan El-Shamy lists 2 variants of the tale type found in Algeria, under the previous name of the type.

==== West Africa ====
Professor Loreto Todd collected a West African (Cameroon) tale titled Bibaiyibaiyi an di papa-wata (Bibaiyibaiyi and the Papa-Water). In this tale, the heroine goes fishing and a creature named Papa-Water appears to her, intent on marrying her. Papa-Water gives her plenty of fish and teaches her a magic song to summon him and the fishes. A group of boys overhears the incantation and summons Papa-Water to kill him. The story was considered by folklorist Dan Ben-Amos as belonging to the type 425M. He also claimed that this narrative was "a common African variation on the Cupid and Psyche theme".

In another West African folktale from the Mandinga people, A noiva da serpente ("The Serpent's Bride"), there lived two sisters, Cumba and Sira. Sira bakes flour breads with "hydromel" (mead) to take to a mysterious person. Cumba follows her sister to a location near the water, and sees Sira chanting a song to summon an enchanted serpent from the waters. After Sira leaves, Cumba returns home to tell her mother everything. The girl returns to the beach with an armed man and sings the song of invocation. The serpent emerges from the water and is killed by the man. Later, Sira eats some food her mother prepared and a hen reveals it is made from the flesh of the serpent. Saddened with grief, she decides to enter the sea and a wave washes over her.

In an African tale from Senegal, collected by author Birago Diop from griot Amadou Koumba with the title Khary-Gaye, translated to Russian as "Кхари-Гайе", a couple named Samba and Koumba have a daughter named Khary. Samba goes with other men to find grains to their village, and Koumba welcomes the women in her kitchen, while her daughter Khary stirs the pot. One day, Pande, her stepmother, sends her stepdaughter with a calabash to fetch water from a well. The girl fills up the calabash, but cannot lift it, so she sings some verses about wanting someone's help. First, the frog M'Bott appears to help her, but she dismisses him; next, the Bagg-lizard appears to offer its help, but she rebuffs it; thirdly, Mama M'Bonata, an old turtle, approaches Khary to help her, but is also shooed away. By nightfall, Khary repeats her verses, when a python appears to lift the calabash and promises to return when she is older to receive its reward. Some time later, they discover Samba's bones, proving his death, which leaves Khary at the mercy of her stepmother. She thus becomes Khary-The Orphan. Years later, the young women of the village gather to talk about potential bridegrooms, and Khary says that, since she is an orphan, neither the frog, nor Djann-The-Serpent will want her, then leaves in tears. Suddenly, a python appears to them and declares it will marry Khary. The girls scramble back to their huts, even Khary, when the python begins to sing a song from the well, saying that Khary-Gaye is its reward. Pande locks the girl outside their hut and tells her to answer the voice's song. She takes her calabash and walks outside the village, when a handsome man on a white horse approaches her. He says he heard her words and has come to take her as his bride, he, the Prince of the Grand Fleuve, then rides with her underwater. Deep in the water, she lives her best years with the Prince of the Grand Fleuve, and bears him two children, a boy and a girl. However, as time passes by, she begins to miss life on land, and asks her husband to be allowed a visit, despite the mistreatment by the hands of her wicked stepmother Penda. Still, the Prince agrees and teaches Khary-Gaye a secret phrase to be repeated three times to summon him, but she is not to reveal the secret command to anyone. Khary Gaye takes her children to her home village, and is accosted by a litany of questions about her whereabouts ever since a large python appeared at the well and sung some verses, mentioning her name. Still, Khary-Gaye ignores their questions and asks them about their lives and the people at their village, and avoids giving a straight answer. After six days, Khary-Gaye's friends try to goad Khary-Gaye's son into revealing the secret, but he keeps mum about it, but they manage to obtain vital information from the boy's sister. The women tell their husbands about it, who gather at the river, utter the secret command to draw the python out of the river and strike him dead. The python turns into the Prince of the Grand Fleuve and sighs over the happiness he felt with Khary-Gaye, but curses her to become a turtledove for not raising their daughter correctly and their daughter a spurge for revealing the secret spell, and bids their son dive in the water, where he lives forevermore. And that is why the turtledove ever sighs "Ferr gou dogg! Keur gou tass!", and the spurge always cries at the mere touch of people.

===== Yoruba people =====
In a tale from Yoruba people titled The Beautiful Girl and the Fish, in a village a girl refuses all suitors, since she will only choose the most handsome man in the land. One day, she sees a man at the marketplace and falls in love with him at once, desiring to become his wife. The man says he wishes he could be her husband, but he is in fact a fish that lives in a river in Idunmaibo, to whom the gods have bestowed the ability to shapeshift into a man. The girl insists to be with him, and says she could visit him by the river. The man agrees and teaches her a magic song to call upon him by the river margin. They spend the days like so: the girl summons him, and he comes out of the water as man and gifts her gems and coral. Some time later, the girl's parents wish to marry their daughter, but she says she is already married, though she cannot disclose his identity. The next time the girl visits her fish lover, her little brother metamorphoses himself into a fly and follows her to spy on his sister's clandestine meeting, then reports back to their father. The girl's father sends his daughter away to some distant parents, then asks his son to lead him to the river at Idunmaibo. After they reach the river margin, they summon the fish lover with the magic song and the girl's father kills him with a hatchet. To further teach his daughter a lesson, he brings home the dead fish and his wife cooks a dish for his daughter's return. The girl refuses to eat the meal, but her father forces her to do it. While she is eating, her little brother sings some verses mocking the girl, mentioning how she is eating her own husband's flesh. Horrified at this revelation, the girl rushes to the river at Idunmaibo and prays to Oluweri, the goddess of the river, for her husband to appear alive; if not, "the face of the river" should appear red as blood. As answer to her plea, the river becomes red; she discovers her lover is dead and jumps into the river, becoming a onijegi (a mermaid). The tale was translated by africanist Ulla Schild into German as Das schöne Mädchen und der Fisch and sourced from Nigeria.

American author Julius Lester published a tale titled The Girl With the Large Eyes. In this tale, in a village in Africa, a girl with large eyes is considered very beautiful, and the subject of marriage prospects among the men in the village. In a certain summer, a drought strikes the land, affecting crops and water bodies. Due to this, the girl with large eyes has no time to think about marriage, for she is busy finding water for her family. One day, the girl is walking by the river margin, when a fish comes to the surface of the river and asks the girl to give her pitcher, for it will give her water. The girl is at first afraid of the talking fish, but fulfills its request and the animal fills her pitcher with cold, clear water. She brings it home to her family, and they ask her where she found it, but she remains silent. For the next days, the girl goes back to the fish to fetch water, and begins to fall in love with it, eventually becoming its wife. One day, however, the girl's father, a witch doctor, suspects his daughter has mixed up with spirits, and turns his son into a fly to trail behind the girl and spy on her. The girl's brother, as a fly, discovers the girl's liaison with the fish, and reports to his father, who fears their affair will bring shame to his family. Thus, he orders the girl at home and takes his son with him to the river, calls upon the fish and kills it. Then, he brings home the dead animal and throws at his daughter's feet, mocking her "husband". The girl, who is pregnant, takes the dead fish with her and walks to a place with flowing waters. Calling on her husband's name, she enters the waters. Drowning in the water, she gives birth to many children, which are water lilies. The tale was originally published as Large Eyes Produce Many Tears by Bakare Gbadamosi and Ulli Beier, and sourced from the Yoruba people.

== Parallels ==
=== Princess Himal and Nagaray ===
Indian scholar Suniti Kumar Chatterji summarized the Lithuanian tale and stated that it "reminded" him of the Kashmiri story about Princess Himal and Nagrai (Nāgaray), the Prince of Nāgas. (Note: German scholar Rainer Eckert also described both stories as having a "surprising correspondence".) Indian scholarship states that the tale exists in the oral repertoire of the region, with multiple renditions appearing in both Persian and Kashmiri in the 18th and 19th centuries. In a variation of the story, Princess Himal is a human and her lover Nagaray is a nāga - a snake-like being that lives in a watery realm, and at the end of the tale deities Shiva and Parvati reunite both lovers by resurrecting their ashes in a magical spring.

=== Vodník (The Water Goblin) ===
Similarities can be found in Vodník, a story written by Czech author Karel Jaromír Erben as a poem in the book Kytice z pověstí národních ("A Bouquet of Folk Legends"). The poem is about a water goblin who is sitting on a poplar by his lake, singing to the moon and sewing clothes for his wedding soon to come. A mother tells her young daughter of a dream she had about clothing her daughter in white robes swirling like foaming water and with pearls of tears hiding deep distress around her neck. She warns her daughter not to go to the lake but the daughter is drawn to the lake anyway. She leaves for the lake to do her laundry. The moment she hands down her first garment into the water, the bridge on which she was sitting collapses. As the water engulfs her she is abducted by the water goblin. He takes her to his underwater castle and marries her. After the birth of their first child, the abducted wife sings it a lullaby about her past, which enrages the water goblin. She tries to calm him down and pleads to be allowed ashore to visit her mother once. He gives in on three conditions: She is not to embrace a single soul, not even her mother; she has to leave the baby behind as a hostage; and she will return by the bells of the evening vespers. The reunion of mother and daughter is very emotional and they eventually hug despite daughter's promise. When evening falls the mother forbids her daughter to go even when the bells are ringing. The water goblin gets angry and thumps on the door, ordering the girl to go with him because his dinner has to be made. When the mother tells him to go away and eat whatever he has for dinner in his lair, he knocks again, saying his bed needs to be made. Again the mother tells him to leave them alone, after which the goblin says their child is hungry and crying. To this plea the mother tells him to bring the child to them. In a furious rage the goblin returns to the lake and through the shrieking storm screams that pierce the soul are heard. The storm ends with a loud crash that stirs up the mother and her daughter. When opening the door the mother finds a tiny head without a body and a tiny body without a head lying in their blood on the doorstep of her hut.

== Legacy ==
=== Toponyms ===
Studies suggest that characters of the tale named several geographic features, such as toponyms and hydronyms of northwestern Russia, Pskov region.

In the 19th century, Polish writer Aleksander Połujański published a study on the Augustów Governorate, and suggested that two places, a lake Jeglówek and a village Jegliniec (where a Lithuanian fortress was previously located), were connected to the name Egle.

=== Cultural references ===
Salomėja Nėris, a Lithuanian poet, wrote a poem called Eglė žalčių karalienė (1940), which is based on the motifs of the tale.

A bronze sculpture displaying Eglė and the Serpent by Robertas Antinis has been installed in Palanga Botanical Garden, Lithuania in 1960.

A ballet Eglė žalčių karalienė by Eduardas Balsys and numerous plays have been staged in various Lithuanian theaters, for the first time in 1960, directed by Juozas Gustaitis.

The story has also inspired the creation of literary tales.

The tale also inspired a literary work by Latvian author Jēkabs Jūsmiņš, in 1880, with the title Zalkša līgava.

A literary telling is attributed to Russian author Leo Tolstoy. In his tale, titled The Snake, the serpent lies on the smock of a girl named Masha. Masha marries the snake and returns from the sea to her mother's house with her two children. Masha's mother is the one to kill the snake husband with a hatchet. After seeing the dead husband, called Osip in the story, Masha curses her daughter to become a swallow, her son to be a nightingale and herself to be a cuckoo.

== See also ==
- Jūratė and Kastytis
- Therianthropy, Shapeshifting, Monstrous bridegroom
- Daphne
- Baucis and Philemon
- The Sea Tsar and Vasilisa the Wise
- The Frog Prince, about an amphibian paramour (ATU 440)
- King Lindworm, about a serpentine husband (ATU 433B)
- Tezin Nan Dlo
- The Lake Beetle as Groom
