= Jūratė and Kastytis =

Lithuanian legendary figures

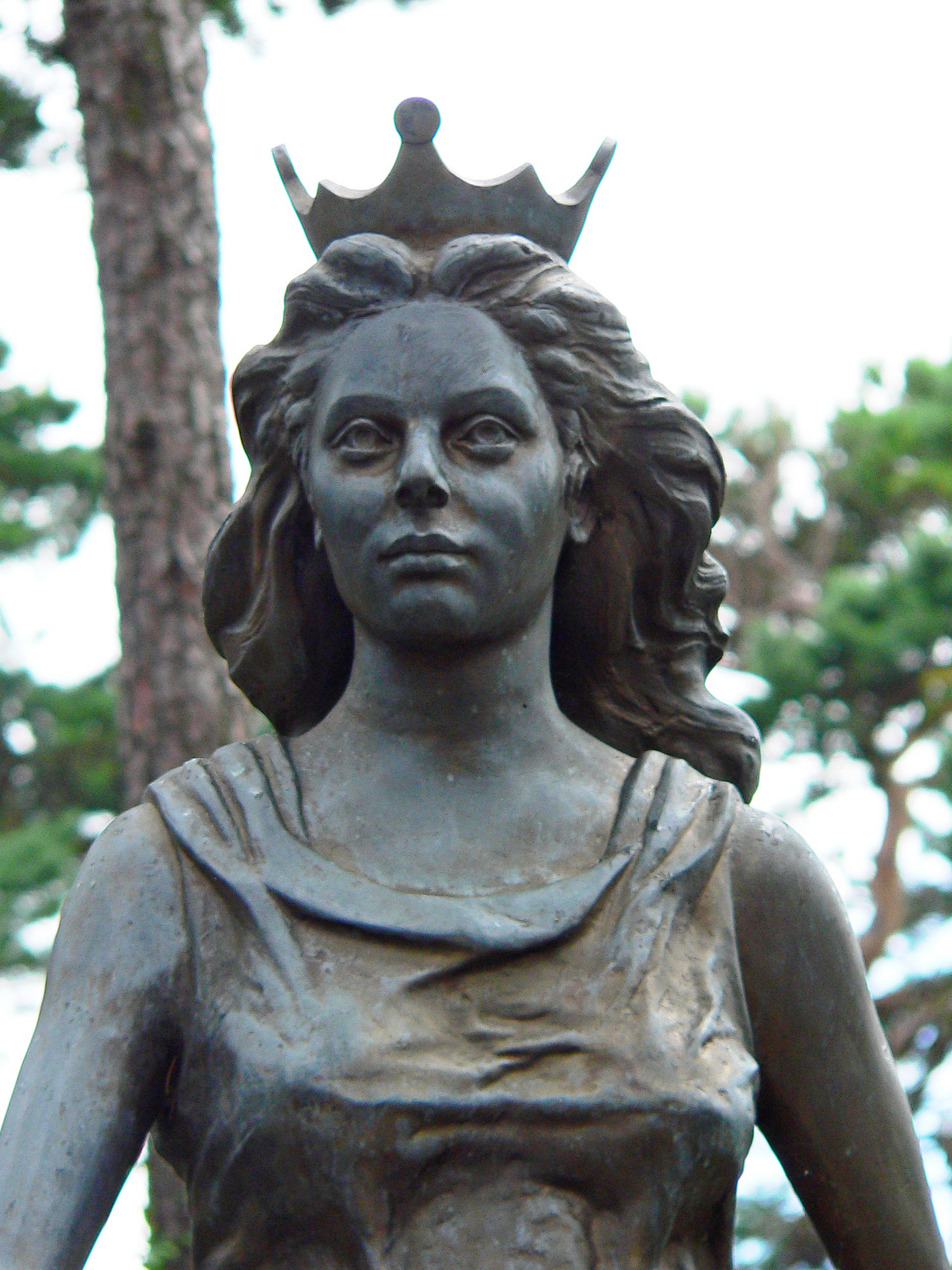
Jūratė - monument in Jurata (Poland)

Jūratė and Kastytis (Lithuanian: Jūratė ir Kastytis) is one of the most famous and popular Lithuanian legends and tales. The first time it was recorded was in 1842, in the writings of Liudvikas Adomas Jucevičius. Since then it has been adapted many times for modern poems, ballets, and even rock operas. Since the heroine does not appear in Lithuanian mythology, the tale is likely of literary-romantic origin.

== Etymology ==
The heroine's name, 'Jūratė', is related to words for 'sea' in Baltic languages, namely, Lithuanian jūra 'sea' and Latvian jũra, jũŗa 'sea, great mass of water'.

== Synopsis ==
The plot greatly varies between the different versions. However, the basic facts remain the same. The goddess (sometimes described as a mermaid or undine) Jūratė lived under the Baltic Sea in a beautiful amber castle. She fell in love with a handsome young fisherman named Kastytis fishing there. They spent happy times in the castle. When the thunder god, Perkūnas, learned that the goddess had fallen in love with a mortal man he became furious and struck the amber castle. It exploded into millions of pieces. According to legend, that is why pieces of amber wash ashore after storms on the Baltic Sea.

Jūratė rescued Kastytis from drowning in a storm. According to other variations, Kastytis was killed by Perkūnas and Jūratė mourns him to this day. Her tear drops are amber pieces washed ashore and one could hear her sad voice in a stormy sea. Sometimes it is said that Kastytis is from Šventoji, north of Palanga.

== Other tales ==
Other stories of the Baltic Sea region also show characters and locations associated with an underwater palace, a watery domain and the amber gemstone.

In a Latvian fairy tale, Bulbulis the Bird, three princes set out on a quest for the magical bird Bulbulis, but only the youngest succeeds. Seething with envy and jealousy, the older brothers cast the youngest into the sea and take the bird for themselves. However, the hero is saved by "the sea queen" and taken to her "amber castle".

In a Polish fairy tale, the water-dwelling maidens with amber-colored hair live with their father, the Amber King, in a palace at the bottom of the sea.

== Cultural significance ==
Lithuanians have numerous legends and tales. Arguably, Eglė, the Queen of Serpents and Jūratė and Kastytis are the best known. Even though Eglė's story is much more complicated and elaborate, both legends are love stories that involve elements of Lithuanian mythology and try to explain origins of certain objects. Both Eglė and Jūratė are popular Lithuanian female names.

Jūratė's crown and amber necklace in the coat of arms of Palanga

Palanga, the main resort in Lithuania, has a monument dedicated to Jūratė and Kastytis. It is located in a square right next to the main tourist attraction—a bridge that leads to sunset. The Palanga coat of arms was designed having the legend in mind. The amber beads represent the ancient business of amber processing. The silver crown represents the goddess Jūratė.

The legend has inspired a number of other artworks. In 1920, Maironis, one of the best known patriotic poets, wrote a ballad to honor the lovers. Much of legend's present popularity is attributed to this poet. Woodcut illustrations by Vaclovas Rataiskis-Ratas for the ballad won awards in an international exhibition in Paris in 1937. In 1933, a ballet was staged. In 1955 exiled composer Kazimieras Viktoras Banaitis finished an opera, premiered in 1972 in Chicago. A play was also written. In 2002, a rock opera was performed in Klaipėda to celebrate its 750th anniversary. A number of celebrities appeared in the opera and it was a success. It continues where the actual legend left off: the castle is destroyed and the lovers are separated. The rock opera is noted for taking a modern twist on old story.

Additionally, Jurata, a Polish sea side resort, popular especially among Varsovians and established during the interwar period is named after Jūratė, which is spelled Jurata in Polish.

== See also ==
- Sadko, a similar Russian legend
- The Little Mermaid
- Rusalka
