= The Lake Beetle as Groom =

Russian fairy tale

The Lake Beetle as Groom (Russian: Озерный жук — жених, romanized: Ozernyy zhuk - zhenikh; English: "The Bettle-Husband from the Lake") is a Russian fairy tale (skazka) collected by Russian philologist Dimitry M. Balashov. It deals with the marriage between a human maiden and a lake beetle that changes into a human named Osip. The heroine's mother murders her husband and the maiden curses her children to become birds at the end of the tale.

The tale is classified in the Aarne-Thompson-Uther Index as type ATU 425M, "The Snake as Bridegroom", a subtype related to the international cycle of the Animal as Bridegroom, in that a human maiden marries a man that can assume animal shape due to a curse or his enchanted nature. The tale is also connected to the Lithuanian and Baltic story of Eglė, the Queen of Serpents, with variants collected in other Slavic languages, like Russian, Belarusian and Ukrainian (East Slavic), and Polish.

== Source ==
The tale was originally collected by Russian philologist Dimitry M. Balashov from informant Elisaveta Ivanovna Sidorova, from Tersky region, in the White Sea, with the title "Озерный жук — жених" ("Lake Bettle - Groom"). Scholar Isidor Levin later translated the tale as Der Seekäfer als Bräutigam.

== Summary ==
An old woman has an only daughter. One day, the girl goes with other girls to bathe in the lake, and leave their clothes on the shore. When they return to fetch their clothes, a beetle appears on the maiden's dress and proposes to her. Her friends put on her clothes, save for her, who is convinced to accept the beetle's proposal. The girl accepts the animal's proposal and retrieves her dress, while the beetle jumps back into the lake. The girl returns home and keeps quiet about the incident.

However, on the same night, the girl and her mother hear some knocking on their house, the voices mentioning something about marriage, and the girl tells her mother about everything. The next night, the same voices knock on the woman's door and demand the bride. The third night, the woman decides to give into their demands, puts her daughter in a funeral dress and sings a funeral lament, as she delivers the girl to the voices, considering her dead since she is now living in the lake.

The story tells that the human maiden marries another "kidnapped" person that was living with the "lake people", named Osip Tsarevich. The girl and Osip have two children, a boy and a girl. One day, she mutters aloud she wishes she could visit her mother back on land. The lake people allow for her visit, and Osip teaches her a command: "Osip, Osip, take me", for her to use when she returns from her visit. The girl takes her children with her and goes to her mother's house. The woman rejoices in finding her daughter is alive and asks her how she lives down there. The girl herself tells her mother about the secret command that allows for her return, then goes to sleep.

While her daughter is asleep, the woman takes an axe and goes to the lake, then calls for Osip. Osip's head emerges from the lake and the woman chops off his head, then returns home to sleep. The next morning, the girl says goodbye to her mother and returns to the lake with her children. She repeats the secret command, but a storm rages on the lake, the water foams blood, and a head, Osip's, floats up to the surface, then floats back down. The maiden turns her son into a dove and her daughter into a hedge swallow (a goldcrest, in another translation), and bids then fly away, while she transforms herself into a cuckoo. The story states that the girl's mother thought that by killing Osip, she would stay on land, but the cuckoo is forever a widow.

== Analysis ==
=== Tale type ===
The tale is classified, in the East Slavic Folktale Classification (Russian: СУС, romanized: SUS), as tale type SUS 425M, "Жена ужа (змея, гада)" ("The Snake's Wife" or "The Grass Snake's Wife"). According to Russian scholarship, tale type 425M sometimes merges with ATU 703, "The Snow-Maiden" in many Russian variants.

The East Slavic type corresponds, in the international Aarne-Thompson-Uther Index, as tale type ATU 425M, "The Snake as Bridegroom" (previously, "Bathing Girl's Garments Kept"): the heroine goes for a swim in the lake, but when she goes to get her clothes a snake (or other animal) sits on her clothes in exchange for her agreeing to marry it; the heroine accepts, and later her animal husband goes to fetch her; the heroine and the animal husband, who becomes human, have children; she takes them to visit her human family and learns a secret song or command that allows for their return; the heroine's children eventually leak the secret to her human family and they kill her animal husband; the heroine and her children try to return to the animal husband, but discover he is dead; lastly, the heroine curses her children to become trees or birds.

=== Motifs ===
==== The heroine's secret code ====
Other variations lie in the secret code the wife learns from her snake husband, and in the fate of the heroine and their children (sometimes all girls; sometimes all boys): they are either transformed into trees or into birds and disappear forever.

==== The children's transformation ====
According to researcher Galina Kabakova, the fate of the children at the end of the tale is important to determine the origin of that particular variant (based on a geographical method): in the main Lithuanian versions, mother and children are transformed into trees, a motif that occurs in versions collected from the Belarus's border between Poland and Lithuania, and in Russian versions collected in Lithuania. On the other hand, if the tale ends with the transformation of the family into birds or reptiles, it is a tale from East Slavic origin. In Jan-Öjvind Swahn's monograph, he considered the bird transformation in other texts to be a "variation" on the motif of the tree transformation.

Galina Kabakova notes that, among the East Slavic populations, the tale type ATU 425M assumes the features of an etiological tale: as remarked by professor Natalie Kononenko, it shows the origins of the cuckoo, the lark and the nightingale. In this regard, the heroine "nearly always" becomes a cuckoo, while her son "almost always" becomes a nightingale, although the children may turn into different birds in other versions. Furthermore, in the Slavic variants, the mother-in-law is the one that kills the snake husband.

== Variants ==
Although it can be considered a tale type developed in the Baltic area, since most of the variants have been recorded there, (Note: A similar assessment was made by professor Jack V. Haney, to whom the tale type appears "only around the south Baltic coast".) variants are reported by scholar Leonardas Sauka to have been collected in nearby countries: 23 variants in Estonia (near Lake Peipus); 150 Lithuanian versions; 89 Latvian versions; 28 from Russia; 22 from Belarus; 6 in Ukraine; 3 from Poland; 2 from Bulgaria. Variants have also been found from Tatar (4 tales) and Kazakh (1 version) sources. Altogether, the variants collected outside Lithuania and Latvia, from 11 countries, amount to 106 versions. The tale is also said to be known in Germany, Finland and among the "Cheremis" (Mari people). Similarly, according to Russian folklorist Lev Barag, despite Stith Thompson's opinion that the tale type existed in Lithuania, it was also reported among East Slavs (in Ukraine, Russia and Belarus), in Poland, Bulgaria, and in Latvia and Estonia.

=== Eastern Europe ===
Professor Jack V. Haney stated that variants of type 425M appear "frequently recorded among the Russians", but "less frequently by Belarusians and Ukrainians".

In addition, another line of Russian scholarship states that the "etiological" tale of the snake husband is "common" ('распространенной', in the original) in Polesian tradition: a girl goes to bathe in the river, a snake sits on her clothes and asks her to marry him; they marry, she lives with him in his underwater palace and bears him a son and a daughter; later, she goes to visit her mother, who learns the secret command to summon the snake husband and kills him; upon discovering her dead husband, the girl turns into a cuckoo, her son into a nightingale, and her daughter into a swallow.

==== Russia ====
Researcher Varvara Dobrovolskaya states that variants in Russia were collected in Kursk, Bashkiria, Ryazan, Voronezh and in East Siberia by the Lena river.

British scholar William Ralston Shedden-Ralston translated a variant collected by A.A. Erlenwein from the Tula Government. In this tale, The Water Snake (or Ujak), an old woman's daughter went to bathe with other girls in the pond. When they finished bathing, a snake appeared and hid the maiden's shift in exchange for her hand in marriage. The girl, dismissing the snake's fanciful notion, agreed to anyway. Some time later, a "troop" of snakes came to the maiden's house to force her to fulfill her promise. The snakes escorted her out of the house and into her fiancée's underwater palace. Three years passed and she returned to her mother's house with two little children, a boy and a girl. When conversing with her mother, the maiden unwittingly revealed her husband's name (Osip) and the incantation to summon him. After she put her daughter and grandchildren to bed, the old woman uttered the incantation, drew forth the snake husband, in human form, out of the palace and decapitated him with an axe. The next morning, the maiden returned to the pond and, after realizing her mother's heinous act, condemned her daughter to become a wren, her son a nightingale and herself a cuckoo.

In a tale collected from a Karelian source with the title "Парень-гад" ("The Reptile Beloved"), twelve maidens go to bathe in the sea and leave their clothes on the shore. After they bathe and play in the water, the maidens return to fetch their clothes, when one of them notices there is a reptile lying on theirs. The reptile promises to return her clothes if she agrees to marry her, to which she answers yes so she can get her clothes back. The girl returns home that same evening and the reptile comes to take his bride. The girl and her mother board up the doors and windows and wait for a sudden storm to pass. This happens for the next two nights, until the girl agrees to go with the reptile. She marries the reptile, which lies on the rivers, and she has two children with him when he becomes human. Suddenly, the girl's mother asks her how she can summon her reptile husband, and the girl reveals the secret. The woman takes a scythe and goes to the river to summon the reptile husband to kill him. The girl rushes back to the lake and, seeing her dead husband, curses her two children to become white swans and herself a gray cuckoo.

In a Russian tale from Voronezh with the title "С ЧЕГО КУКУШКА У НАС ЗАВЕЛАСЬ" ("How the Cuckoo appeared to us"), a couple have a daughter. The man dies, and the widowed mother raises her daughter Masha alone, never letting her out of the house. One day, when the girl is old enough, she leaves with some girls to swim in the river. When she comes out of the water, she sees a snake on her garments. The animal agrees to return her clothes if she agrees to a marriage with it. Masha's friends return home, but the girl goes to live with the snake. The next year, Masha returns to the shore with a girl in her arms, and asks her husband how she can return home; the snake teaches her a command to summon him. The next year, Masha brings home her two children, a boy and the same girl, to visit their grandmother. Masha goes home and naïvely revels her mother the secret command to summon her husband. After the old woman puts her family to sleep, she takes an ax, goes to the shore, summons the snake and kills it. The next day, Masha goes alone to the shore and tries to summon her husband, the snake, but she finds him dead. She returns home, takes her children and brings them to the forest. They sit under an oak tree, Masha curses her daughter to be a little bird, her son a nightingale, and herself into a cuckoo. It happens thus, and they fly to different directions.

In another tale from Voronezh Oblast titled "Маша и Уж" ("Masha and the Snake"), a girl named Masha is invited by her friends to swim in the river, and asks if her mother allows it. The woman does and Masha joins the other girls in the water, leaving their clothes on the banks. While they come out of the water, the girls fetch their garments, by Masha sees a snake on hers. The snake asks if Masha will marry it. The girl agrees, if only to shoo out the snake and get her clothes back. She goes back home, and her mother scolds her for her decision. Years later, snakes come to her house and take her to their master in a pond. She lives underwater with the snake and bears him two children, then comes out of the pond to visit her mother. Masha brings her children to meet their grandmother, and she reveals her mother the secret command to summon her snake husband. Later, the woman goes to the pond with an ax, goes to the pond and summons the snake husband to kill him. The next day, Masha returns with her children to the edge of the pond and tries to summon the snake, but can only see blood at the surface. Realizing what happened, she curses her daughter to become a little bird, her son a nightingale, and herself into a cuckoo.

In a Russian tale titled "Южик" ("Yuzhik"), some girls go to take a bathe in the water, and when they leave, one of them finds a "yuzh" on her clothes, which offers the garments in return for marrying it. The girl agrees and goes home. Later, the "yuzh" goes to the girl's house to take her to his underwater kingdom. Two years later, the girl, now mother to a pair of children (a boy and a girl), wishes to return home to visit her mother. Her underwater husband agrees to her visit. The girl takes her children to visit their grandmother. The old woman goes to the edge of the pond and summons the animal husband, Yuzhenka, then kills him. After the killing, Yuzhenka's wife curses her daughter to become a nightingale to sing at dawn, her son to become a swallow and fly over the water, and herself into a cuckoo, to cry over her lost Yuzhenka.

Researcher Galina Kabakova published a tale collected from a 15-year-old source from Ponik, Baltay, Saratov Oblast. In this tale, titled Le mari couleuvre ("The snake husband"), six-year-old Anouchka goes to take a bath in the river with her friends, then goes to fetch her shirt, but finds a snake on it. The snake announces it wants to marry her and will return the garment if she agrees to marry him. Anouchka agrees. Years later, when she is eighteen, the snake himself goes to her house, then sends a cadre of snakes to fetch her and bring her underwater, where she gives birth to her and the snake's children. Some time later, Anouchka pays her mother a visit, and says her life is happy under the blue sea. Her mothers asks Anouchka how she can enter her husband's domains, and she reveals the secret spell to summon him. Her mother convinces her daughter to stay the night, and the woman seize the opportunity to go to the seashore, summon her snake son-in-law and kill him. The following morning, Anouchka takes her two children, a boy and a girl, and returns to the sea. She tries to summon her husband three times, until she sees the bloody water, then realizes her husband is dead. Thus, she curses her son to become a nightingale, to sing in the forests by dawn, her daughter a free bird to fly over the water that was her father's, and herself into a cuckoo, to fly over the forests and cry over her husband.

In a Russian tale collected in Kursk in the 1930s with the title "Уж" ("Snake"), some girls go to take a bath in the river, and when they go back they find a snake lying on the clothes of one of them. The girl's companions take their clothes and leave, while the girl remains. The snake asks the girl to marry him, and the girl agrees to the snake's terms. Three days later, a horde of snakes reach the girl's house to take her to their master, and the girl's mother asks the girl the meaning of the event. The girl tells her mother, and the woman locks up the doors and windows, but the snakes break into the house and take the girl with them. Three years pass, and the girl asks her snake husband to pay her human family a visit, which the snake allows. The girl takes her two children with her to visit their grandmother. The woman is happy to see her daughter alive, since she knows the girl was dragged to the bottom of the water, and asks her how is life. The girl says she is happy. The woman asks her daughter to spend the night in her old home, and asks how she can reach her snake husband. The girl says that she goes to the river margin and calls the snake with a command to come fetch her. That same night, while her daughter is asleep, the woman goes to the river margin, summons the snake and chops off his head with an axe, then returns home. The following morning, the girl takes her children to the river and tries to summon her snake husband, but finds his head on the margin. She then curses her daughter to become a swallow, her son a nightingale, and herself into a cuckoo.

In a tale from Bobrava, titled "Уж – Машенькин муж" ("Snake - Mashenka's Husband"), a couple have a daughter named Masha. After the father dies, the mother protects the girl and does not let her leave the house to work, nor to bathe in the river. One day, her friends invite her for a river bath and the joins them. When they leave the water to put on their clothes, Masha finds a snake on hers. She tries to shoo away the snake, but it hisses, so she promises to marry the animal and gains the clothes back. Masha returns home and tells her mother her bridegroom will come to her on Saturday. On the appointed date, Masha is combing her hair when she notices a cadre of snakes is coming to her house, so her mother lockes the doors and windows, but a snake breaks in through the window and they carry Masha away. After three years, Masha pays her mother a visit with two children in tow, her daughter and her son. Masha tells her mother she is married to the Water King. Her mother asks Masha how to summon the snake husband, and she reveals the secret command for Osip to come take her. At night, while Masha goes to the communal dance ("хоровод", in the original), the woman asks her granddaughter where the family lives, and the little girl answers that they live by the shore. Later, the woman dreams of killing the snake, so she wakes up, takes an axe and goes to the shore to summon Osip. The snake appears on the shore and she beheads him, then goes back home. Masha returns home from the dance and cannot sleep, for she senses something amiss, so she wakes up and decides to return to her husband, despite her mother insisting she stays a bit more. Masha takes her children to the shore and tries to summon Osip, but he cannot answer. She finds his hacked up remains on the shore, so she curses her son to become a falcon ("сокол", in the original) to remember his father, her daughter to become a swallow to remember her father, and herself into a cuckoo to remember her husband.

Russian scholarship states that a tradition in Pskov holds that the daughter of the snake husband turns into a frog.

Another Russian variant of tale type ATU 425M was collected in Tver with the title "Уженька и Маша" ("Uzhenka and Masha").

==== Romani-Kelderari ====
In a Romani-Kelderari tale from Russia, titled "Змей и дочери богатыря" ("The Zmei and the rich man's daughters"; "The Serpent and the rich man's daughters"), collected in 1986, from seventy-five teller informant named Krizhma Vinogradova, in Peri station, in Leningrad Oblast, a rich man has three beautiful daughters. One day, the girls go to swim in a lake. They remove their clothes and jump in the water. When they return, they find a serpent on the youngest's garments. Despite some fear, the elder girls take some sticks to shoo away the snake and fetch their garments. The youngest girl cannot remove her clothes, when the snake proposes to the girl. She declines, since her parents do not know it and thinking of the people's mockery. The snake asks her to marry it three times more, and, when she insists to refuse the animal, it threatens to kill her. The girl then agrees to marry the animal. She retrieves her clothes and returns home in tears to wait for the snake husband. On the appointed day, the snake appears and takes the girl on a carriage to his house. There, the girl bears four children, three boys and a girl. The snake forbids the girl from visiting her family for ten years. After ten years, the snake allows her to leave, if she fulfills three riddles. The girl cannot answer them. Near the couple a wizard lives whom she consults about the riddles. The wizard advises her to take the words the snake taught her and throw them in the fire to burn them, so that her husband forgets about it. It happens thus, and the snake allows his wife to take their children to their grandparents, provided that the children lie that their father is an ordinary man, not a snake; if they reveal the truth, misfortune will befall them. The girl then takes her grandchildren to her parents, and the couple ask them about their father, although they already know the answer. However, people keep mocking the children for their snake father, and they admit the truth. The girl takes the children home, and their snake father flails its tail, turning their daughter into a birch tree and the boys into pine trees. The girl asks about their children, and the snake points to the trees. The tale ends.

==== Ukraine ====
Researcher Galina Kabakova translated and published a variant from Ukraine titled Les coucous, les alouettes et les reptiles. In this tale, the heroine curses her daughter to become a skylark, her son a snake, and herself into a cuckoo. She also cited variants wherein the daughter becomes an ortie (nettle) or a cuckoo, and the son becomes a basilisk or a nightingale.

English scholar A. H. Wratislaw collected the tale Transformation into a Nightingale and a Cuckoo (Russian: Prevrastenye v Solovya i kukushku) from "Little Russia" in his Sixty Folk-Tales from Exclusively Slavonic Sources. In this tale, a human maiden falls in love with a snake and they both live in an underground palace made of crystal. She becomes the mother of twins (a girl and a boy). Her old mother seizes a sickle and "rushed into the country". The maiden "saw she had manifest death before her" and, by her command, orders her children to become birds: the boy a nightingale and the girl a cuckoo, and it is implied that a dead nettle is what remained of her.

==== Poland ====
A variant from Poland has been translated into English with the title Egle and Zaltis.

According to scholarship, variants collected in northern Poland, in the ancient territories of the Yotvingians (Jatvings), show the Égle's twelve brothers are eventually punished by Baltic thunder god Perkūnas.

Bronisław Sokalski published another Polish variant with the title Król wężów ("The Serpent King"). In this tale, three sisters are bathing in the water. The two elders leave, while the youngest, named Lilla, tries to find her dress and sees a snake on it. The animal makes her promise to marry him in exchange for the dress. The next day, two snakes come to her house to fetch her to their master. (Note: Philologist and folklorist Julian Krzyżanowski (pl), establisher of the Polish Folktale Catalogue according to the international index, classified similar Polish tales under his own type T 458, Małżeństwo z wężem (Persefona) ("The Woman Marrying a Snake - Persephone)".)

In a version sourced from Suwałki and published by Zygmunt Filipowicz, a girl marries serpent Zaltis and bears him two boys and a girl. Down the water, Egle is happy with her life, but asks her husband Zaltis to pay her family a visit. Zaltis relents and allows her to go to the surface. However, since her parents are dead, Egle's brothers welcome her and let their nephews and niece in. They force the little girl to reveal the secret command, go to the sea and summon Zaltis to kill him. After her visit, Egle takes her children to the seashore and tries to summon her husband Zaltis with the spell, but only blood foams at the surface. Egle falls into despair at realizing her husband is dead. The gods, pitying her pain, turn her into a spruce, her two sons into an oak and an ash, and her daughter into a quaking aspen.

In a Polish tale translated as Jegle and the King of the Lakes, a fisherman has two sons and goes to fish in the lake, when, suddenly, a storm begins to rage on the lake, threatening to drown the man. However, he is rescued by a mysterious man with greenish hair who introduces himself as Zaltis, the King of the Lakes. The fisherman is thankful for the rescue and asks what he can offer in return; Zaltis says he wants the fisherman's most valuable thing, and promises to grant him fish for his whole life. The fisherman returns home and discovers his wife had given birth to a baby girl named Jegle. Years pass, the fisherman's wife dies and Jegle runs the house while her father and brothers are away. She likes to spend her days dipping her feet in water, and a large green fish plays between her feet. Later, an old woman pays a visit to Jegle in search of her, and she turns into a woman, saying she brings news from Jegle's bridegroom, Zaltis, and bids the girl meets him by the edge of the lake the following day. Jegle goes to the lake to meet Zaltis, who is in human form, and takes her to his underwater palace. They live happily for a time, until the day Jegle begins to miss her father and wishes to visit him. Zaltis agrees to let her visit his father-in-law, and he brings her to the surface world. Jegle is happy to visit her father, but her brothers secretly decide to take her back from the King of the Lakes. After her visit, Jegle goes to the edge of the lake to wait for her husband; her brothers follow her and wait for Zaltis to come out of the lake. As soon as the lacustrine king emerges, his brothers-in-law try to grab him, but his magic turns them into stones. Zaltis takes Jegle back to their palace, and explains her brothers will be restored to normal after a while.

==== Belarus ====
According to scholarship, only one Belarusian variant of the tale contains the daughter's transformation into a frog.

== Bibliography ==
- ДОБРОВОЛЬСКАЯ, В. Е. (2015). "ИСТОРИЯ ФИКСАЦИИ СКАЗКИ «ЖЕНА УЖА» (425 М) У РУССКИХ" [HISTORY OF RECORDING OF FOLKTALE “GRASS-SNAKE AS A HUSBAND (BATHING GIRL’S GARMENT KEPT UNTIL PROMISE OF MARRIAGE)” (425 M) AMONG RUSSIANS]. Традиционная Культура [Traditional Culture] (in Russian). 16 (4 (60)): 90–98.
- Каяниди, Леонид Геннадьевич (2019). "СКАЗКИ ТИПА 425M «ЖЕНА УЖА» ИЗ СМОЛЕНСКОЙ И БРЕСТСКОЙ ОБЛАСТЕЙ". Живая Старина (in Russian). 2 (102): 34–37. ISSN 0204-3432.
- Kayanidi, L.G. (2020). "Структурно-семантическая типология метаморфозно-орнитологического сюжета восточнославянской сказки (СУС 425М)" [Structural and semantic typology of the metamorphic ornithological plot of an East Slavic tale (SUS 425М)]. Фольклор: Структура, Типология, Семиотика [Folklore: Structure, Typology, Semiotics] (in Russian). 3 (1): 56–93. doi:10.28995/2658-5294-2020-3-1-56-93 (inactive 8 April 2026).
