= Bobrava =

Bobrava Бобрава
- Selo
- Location within Belgorod Oblast Location within Russia
- Coordinates: 50°56′N 35°46′E
- Country: Russia
- Region: Belgorod Oblast
- District: Rakityansky District
- Time zone: UTC+3:00

Bobrava (Russian: Бобрава) is a rural locality (a selo) and the administrative center of Bobravskoye Rural Settlement, Rakityansky District, Belgorod Oblast, Russia. The population was 1,419 as of 2010. There are 10 streets.

== Geography ==
Bobrava is located 17 km north of Rakitnoye (the district's administrative centre) by road. Novozakharovka is the nearest rural locality.
