= RAM (band) =

Haitian band

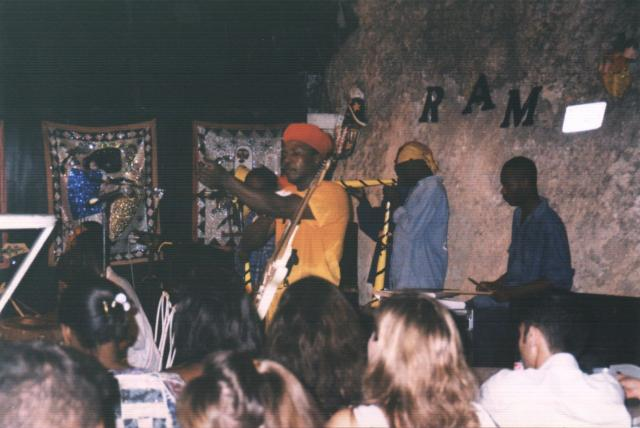
- Live performance at the Hotel Oloffson, June, 1998.

Background information
- Origin: Port-au-Prince, Haiti
- Genre: Mizik rasin
- Years active: 1990–present
- Labels: Cave Wall Records; Margaritaville Records; Willibelle; Delta Records
- Members: Richard A. Morse, Lead Singer; Lunise Morse, Lead Singer; Wilson Theluse, Drummer; Jean Mary Brignol, Drummer; Robert Wood Romain, Drummer; Jose Mondelus, Bass; Onito Parfait, Guitar; Jean Emmanuel Marcelin, Keyboards; Yonel Justin, Roland Octapad; Sylvain Jean, Chorus; Patou Lindor, Chorus; Jonas Jean, Horn; Pierre Jules, Horn
- Past members: Milo Pierre, Drummer; Andre Thelus, Drummer; Sergo Pierre, Drummer; Wilda Leblanc, Chorus; Mikerline Louis Charles, Chorus; Darling Delice, Chorus; Rosna Marcelin, Chorus; Gerald Georges, Chorus

RAM is a mizik rasin band based in the city of Port-au-Prince, Haiti. The band derives its name from the initials of its founder, songwriter, and lead male vocalist, Richard A. Morse. The band's music has been described by Morse as "Vodou rock 'n' roots", and has been one of the prominent bands in the mizik rasin musical movement in Haiti. RAM began performing together in 1990, and recorded their first album in 1996. The band's music incorporates traditional Vodou lyrics and instruments, such as rara horns and petro drums, into modern rock and roll. The band's songs include lyrics in Haitian Creole, French, and English.

RAM is famous for its regular Thursday night performances at the Hotel Oloffson in downtown Port-au-Prince, attended by hotel guests and a wide spectrum of the country's political and racial groups. During the years of the military junta of Raoul Cédras, one of the band's singles, "Fèy", was banned nationwide by the military authorities who perceived it to be a song of support for the exiled President Jean-Bertrand Aristide. The band continued to play weekly concerts in defiance of death threats from the regime until Morse only narrowly escaped a kidnapping from the hotel in 1994. The band began recording albums in 1996, after United States military intervention restored Aristide to power. In 1998, the band clashed with the newly elected mayor of Port-au-Prince, a supporter of Aristide, and survived an assassination attempt during their Carnival performance. Through its song lyrics, RAM continues to provoke the antagonism of both the supporters of Aristide and former military regimes.

== History ==
=== Background and early years ===
RAM was formally created in 1990 by Richard A. Morse, his wife Lunise, and a group of folkloric musicians and dancers in Port-au-Prince, Haiti. Richard would become the songwriter and lead male vocalist. Lunise became the lead female vocalist. The other band members were all recruited from Port-au-Prince, including some of the poorest neighborhoods in the city. The name of band, RAM, comes from Morse's initials.

Morse was born in Puerto Rico, but grew up in the town of Woodbridge, Connecticut in the United States. His father, Richard M. Morse, was an American academic sociologist and author, and his mother was a famous Haitian singer, Emerante de Pradine. Morse graduated from Princeton University in 1979 with a degree in anthropology. He joined a band in New York City, called The Groceries, that played new wave and punk rock music with Caribbean musical style elements.

1985 was a turning point in Morse's life. He was dating a woman whose father strongly disapproved of his daughter dating a musician, and he had a falling out with his fellow band members over musical differences. A conversation with a French record producer persuaded Morse to start over and move to Port-au-Prince to better explore Haitian and Caribbean music. In 1987, he signed a 15-year lease to manage the Hotel Oloffson, then in near ruins and the inspiration for the fictional Hotel Trianon in Graham Greene's famous 1966 novel The Comedians. In restoring the hotel business, Morse hired a local folkloric dance troupe and slowly converted it into a band.

Morse and the band began experimenting with the new sounds of rasin music. One of the most important musical movements that swept Haiti in the years following the exile of dictator Jean-Claude Duvalier, mizik rasin, or simply rasin, combines elements of traditional Vodou ceremonial and folkloric music with rock and roll. The ancient drum rhythms of former African slaves combined with the beat of American rock and roll was a perfect combination for the musical background of Morse. The Hotel Olofsson was also a perfect venue for rehearsals and performances. When not on tour elsewhere in the country, RAM began playing a regular performance every Thursday night at the hotel.

=== The Junta Years: 1991–1994 ===
Many times during its history, the band has become intimately involved in Haitian politics. During the years of the military junta led by Raoul Cédras from 1991 to 1994, provocative music and art thought to have hidden messages of support for Jean-Bertrand Aristide and his political party, Lavalas, frequently met with persecution from the regime. During Carnival in Port-au-Prince in 1992, RAM was ordered by the regime to perform on the Champs du Mars, a large open park in the center of the city. The regime was determined to have a rasin band playing during Carnival to lend an air of normalcy to the event. Before a crowd of over 10,000 people, the band sang an old folk ballad with the refrain "Kote moun yo? Pa wè moun yo." ("Where are the people? We do not see them.") When they realized the song was a parable about the exiled president-elect Aristide, uniformed soldiers cut off electricity to the stage. The junta hesitated to arrest or physically harm the band, however, as RAM's existence was useful for presenting an appearance of legitimacy to the outside world, and because Morse was a United States citizen.

First performed during that same Carnival concert in 1992, RAM began regularly playing a song entitled "Fèy", the Creole word for "leaf". The lyrics for the song were of Vodou folkloric origins, adapted to rasin music. Despite no overt references to the political situation, it was widely played on the radio and immediately taken up throughout the country as an unofficial anthem of support for Aristide. By the summer of 1992, playing or singing the song was banned under military authority, and Morse was subjected to death threats from the regime. In one particular instance, Morse was summoned before Evans François, the brother of Colonel Michel François, who told Morse that any number of assassins would be willing to kill him for as little as fifty cents in payment. Nevertheless, the band continued to play "Fèy" live at their weekly concerts at the Oloffson. The band would later document the François death threat in the mixed-language ballad "Gran Bwa", released in 1997 on their second album, Puritan Vodou.

The band first made the world scene in 1993, when one of its most popular singles, "Ibo Lele (Dreams Come True)", a song with both English and Creole lyrics, was included in the soundtrack for the major motion picture Philadelphia, next to famous musicians including Bruce Springsteen and Neil Young. The song was later re-released on RAM's first album, Aïbobo, in 1996. This new-found success overseas did not, however, translate to security at home. By April 1994, the band had to finish rehearsals before dark so that band members heading home could cross an open area in the city center known as "The Frontier" without too much risk of random violence.

One of the most dangerous moments for the band and for Morse personally occurred on September 8, 1994. RAM was performing their regular Thursday night concert at the Hotel Oloffson. One of the audience members was a military officer who had attended several other RAM performances, including one at a club called The Garage in Pétion-Ville at which he explicitly permitted the band to play "Fèy". During the September 8 concert, however, when the band began to play "Fèy", this officer decided to enforce the ban on the song and ordered RAM to stop playing it. While the band played on, Morse was physically being carried out of the hotel by armed men. Using a wireless microphone, he sang in a verse in Creole that was not in the song, "Kadja bosou a ye ma prale" - a prayer to the Vodou loa to grant him safe passage. His kidnappers released him and took another captive instead. Concerned about the safety of their fans, the band ceased performing for several weeks.

Throughout the political upheaval of Haiti in the 1990s, RAM's regular Thursday evening performance at the Hotel Oloffson was one of the few regular social events in Port-au-Prince in which individuals of various political positions and allegiances could congregate. Regular attendees of the performances included foreign guests at the hotel, members of the military, paramilitary attachés and former Tonton Macoutes, members of the press, diplomats, foreign aid workers, artists, and businessmen. Attendees included both black Haitians and members of the nation's less populous racial groups. Until September 19, 1994, when U.S. military troops arrived to oust the Cédras regime, the performances at the Oloffson offered a unique situation for all parties involved and helped sustain the band, despite its confrontations with the junta, in a period when many other artists either fled the country, were persecuted, or killed.

=== After the Regime: 1994–2004 ===
Although the band supported Aristide and Lavalas during the years of the Cédras regime, like many other Haitians, Morse began to grow disillusioned with the nation's president and his new political party, Fanmi Lavalas. Aristide aides approached the band to first request songs favorable to the government and later threaten the band when Morse refused. In 1998, Manno Charlemagne, the newly elected Fanmi Lavalas mayor of Port-au-Prince and himself an accomplished professional musician who had lived in exile during the Cédras junta, sent armed men to the Oloffson. They dismantled the float on which RAM was scheduled to perform in the upcoming annual Carnival on February 24. The mayor had taken offense to the lyrics of one of the band's songs, which he interpreted as an accusation of corruption. After the destruction of the float, the band was told they would be allowed to perform on a flatbed truck. However, the brakes on the truck were sabotaged and during the Carnival procession, the truck swerved into the crowd, killing eight and forcing the members of the band to flee for their lives. In 2000, Morse stated in an interview that "The precedent has been set that if you want to be involved in politics in this country, you've got to get your guns together... Nothing's changed, the teams have changed but not the modus operandi."

When not touring elsewhere in Haiti or abroad, RAM continued to play its regular weekly concerts at the Hotel Oloffson throughout the 2000s. In 2002, the band released a third album, Kite Yo Pale, whose title translates to "Let Them Talk" in English. A 2003 release, MadiGra, was a "greatest hits" compilation of songs from the three previous albums. A fifth album, with a French language title, Le Jardin ("The Garden" in English), also released in 2003, contains mostly new material, some of which is considered critical of Jean-Bertrand Aristide and Fanmi Lavalas. Aristide departed the country on February 29, 2004, after months of protest and political violence. Despite Morse's comments to the press and the band's famous rivalry with Manno Charlemagne, RAM was nevertheless still associated with its past support for Aristide and Lavalas and its opposition to the previous military junta. On November 4, 2004, three members of the band were illegally detained by uniformed Haitian police during RAM's weekly Thursday night performance. The three band members all lived in a Port-au-Prince neighborhood where support for Aristide was reportedly strong. Caught in the middle, RAM continues to draw the ire of both Aristide supporters and the supporters of past military governments.

RAM was expected to release a sixth album in the summer of 2006, which was reported to include a single entitled "Jamaican Vacation", a song about Jean-Bertrand Aristide's 2004 exile from Haiti that included a stop in Jamaica.

== Musical style ==
Richard Morse describes the band's musical style as "Vodou rock and roots". The mizik rasin movement began soon after the exile of dictator Jean-Claude Duvalier in 1987. Under the regimes of Jean-Claude and his father, François Duvalier, the government appropriated for itself the authority of the Vodou religious traditions and made extensive use of religious leaders and traditions to assert its brutal authority and impose order over the population. When Jean-Claude Duvalier fled the country, a widespread dechoukaj uprooted the most oppressive elements of the former regime and liberated the Vodou religion from its entanglements with the government. Unable to do so under the Duvaliers, musicians were eager to adopt traditional Vodou folk music rhythms, lyrics, and instrumentation into a new sound that incorporated elements of rock and roll and American pop music. This style of modern music reaching back to the roots of Vodou tradition came to be called mizik rasin in Creole or musique racine in French.

The Hotel Oloffson was one of the early concert venues for rasin bands and performers beginning in 1987. Rasin bands incorporated not only traditional Vodou folk music lyrics and rhythms into modern musical style, but included petwo drums and rara horns, instruments used in Vodou religious ceremonies. When Morse gathered together dancers and musicians to create RAM in 1990, the rasin style was popular in Port-au-Prince and gaining popularity in the rest of the country. "Ke'm Pa Sote" by Boukman Eksperyans, whose song title translates to "I Am Not Afraid" in English, was the most popular song at the 1990 Carnival in Port-au-Prince. It was widely understood to be a criticism of the corrupt military government of General Prosper Avril. RAM adopted a similar format and together with Boukman Eksperyans and other rasin bands developed the style and genre of protest music grounded in Vodou musical tradition. Eventually, Richard Morse became so involved in the Vodou religion through his music that he was initiated as a houngan, or Vodou priest, in 2002. Describing a RAM concert, Morse explains, "Yes, you might see our dancers go into a trance. Some get possessed by the loas, to the rhythm of the drums, but it's a natural state when it happens. You can't fake it."

The musical style of RAM combines Vodou rhythms with rock and roll, but also includes influences from the blues, funk music, and occasional riffs from The Clash. Elements of other Haitian and Caribbean musical traditions, such as kompa, find their way into the music as well. The lyrics are a mixture of English, Creole, and French, and many of the songs are narratives of the personal experiences of the band, or social commentary on current events in Haiti. "Boat People Blues" on the album Puritan Vodou, for example, offers a lament for the refugees who fled Haiti following the 1991 coup d'état. On the same album, "Ayizan", describes the final conversation between Morse and his friend, the artist Stevenson Magloire, the day before Magloire was stoned to death in the street by paramilitary attachés. The band's popularity in Haiti stems in part from this challenge to authority, known as "voye pwen" or "sending a point." As one Port-au-Prince resident has said of Morse and the band, "I love his music. He tells what's real, what's going on, like Bob Marley."

== Albums ==
- Aïbobo (1993)
- Puritan Vodou (1997)
- Kite Yo Pale (2002)
- MadiGra (2003)
- Le Jardin (2003)
- Manmanm Se Ginen (2016)

== In popular culture ==
The song "Ibo Lele (Dreams Come True)", was featured in the 1993 film Philadelphia, and was included on its soundtrack.

== See also ==
- Erzulie (song)
