= Music of Haiti =

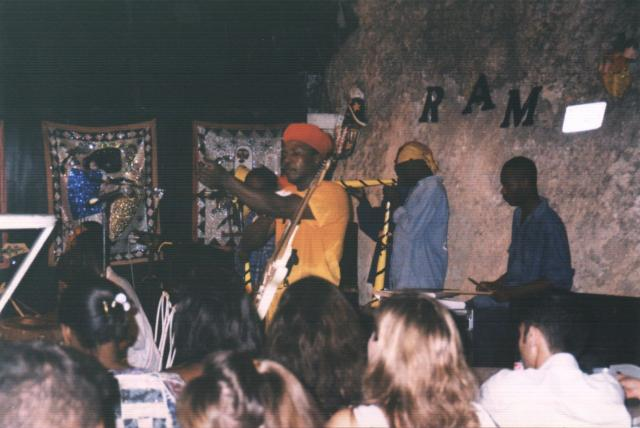
Haitian band RAM playing at the Hotel Oloffson in Port-au-Prince

The Music of Haiti combines a wide range of influences drawn from the diverse population that has settled on this Caribbean island. It often has hints of French, African rhythms, Spanish elements and others who have inhabited the island of Hispaniola and minor native Taino influences. Styles of music unique to the nation of Haiti include music derived from rara parading music, twoubadou ballads, mini-jazz rock bands, rasin movement, hip hop Creole, the wildly popular compas, and méringue as its basic rhythm. Haitian music is influenced mostly by European colonial ties and African migration (through slavery). In the case of European colonization, musical influence has derived primarily from the French.

One of Haiti's musical traditions is known to outsiders simply as compas. But in the former non-standardized Haitian Creole, Haitians identify it variously as compa, conpa, and konpa-dirèk. Regardless of its various spellings, compas refers to a complex, ever-changing music genre that fuses African rhythms, European ballroom dancing, and Haitian bourgeois aesthetics. The word may have derived from the Spanish compás, which relates to the musical rhythm of the "beat" or "pulse." One of the most distinctive features of Haitian compas music is its steady, pulsing drumbeat, which makes it easy to dance to.

Haïti Chérie is a traditional patriotic and most recognizable song of Haiti that was written and composed by Dr. Othello Bayard de Cayes and was initially called Souvenir d'Haïti. It represents the pride Haitian people feel for their country and culture. Within the Haitian community, at home and abroad, it is widely considered as a second national anthem to La Dessalinienne and the song has recorded several different versions.

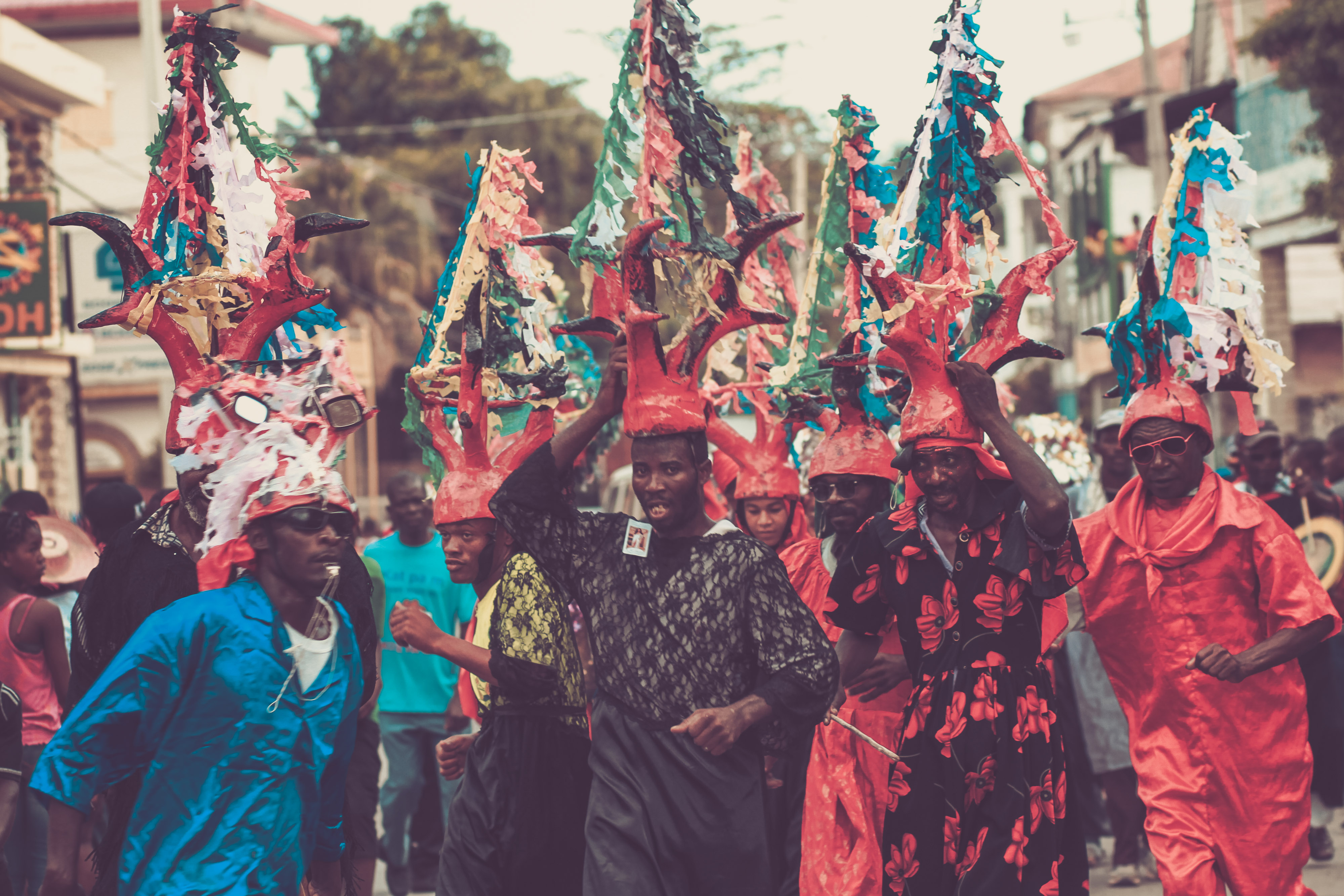

Haiti did not have recorded music until 1937 when Jazz Guignard was recorded non-commercially. One of the most current popular Haitian artists is Wyclef Jean. His music is somewhat hip hop mixed with worldbeat. Haitian music has risen on TikTok such as konpa as it has been used in many videos with millions sharing videos of it dancing.

== Folk dance music ==
=== Carabinier ===
Carabinier (or Karabinye) is a Haitian traditional dance style that is said to be created by Euphémie Daguilh, one of Dessalines' mistresses. The dance is said to be created for the Haitian soldiers during the Haitian Revolution, and meant to be danced with their carabine strap to their back, hence the name. Dessalines himself was an excellent karabinye dancer according to oral and written tradition. Karabinye is named after carabine straps which Haitian soldiers used during the Haitian revolution.

=== Méringue ===
Méringue is a guitar-based style historically connected to merengue but without the use of the accordion. The blend of African and European cultures has created popular dance music, music played on simple acoustic instruments. Méringue has lost popularity to kompa.

=== Rara ===
Rara music is a Lenten processional music with strong ties to the Vodou religious tradition. It has often been confused with Haitian Carnival, since both celebrations involve large groups of dancing revelers in the streets. Rara is performed between Ash Wednesday (the day after Carnival ends) until Easter Sunday (or Easter Monday in some parts of Haiti.) Rara bands roam the streets performing religious ceremonies as part of their ritual obligations to the lwa. Gede, a spirit associated with death and sexuality, is an important spiritual presence in Rara celebrations and often possesses a houngan (male Vodou priest) or mambo (female Vodou priest) before the band begins its procession, blessing the participants and wishing them safe travels for their nightly sojourns.

=== Twoubadou ===
Twoubadou is a form of music played by peripatetic troubadours playing some combination of acoustic, guitar, beat box and accordion instruments singing ballads of Haitian, French or Caribbean origin. It is in some ways similar to Son Cubano from Cuba as a result of Haitian migrant laborers who went to work on Cuban sugar plantations at the turn of the 20th century. Musicians perform at the Port-au-Prince International Airport and also at bars and restaurants in Pétion-Ville.

== Popular music ==
=== Compas / Konpa ===
Compas, short for compas direct, is the modern méringue (mereng in creole) that was popularized in the mid-1950s by the sax and guitar player Nemours Jean-Baptiste. His méringue soon became popular throughout the Antilles, especially in Martinique and Guadeloupe. Webert Sicot and Nemours Jean-Baptiste became the two leaders in the group. Sicot then left and formed a new group and an intense rivalry developed, though they remained good friends. To differentiate himself from Nemours, Sicot called his modern méringue, cadence rampa.

In Creole, it is spelled as konpa dirèk or simply konpa. It is commonly spelled as it is pronounced as kompa.

=== Mini-jazz ===
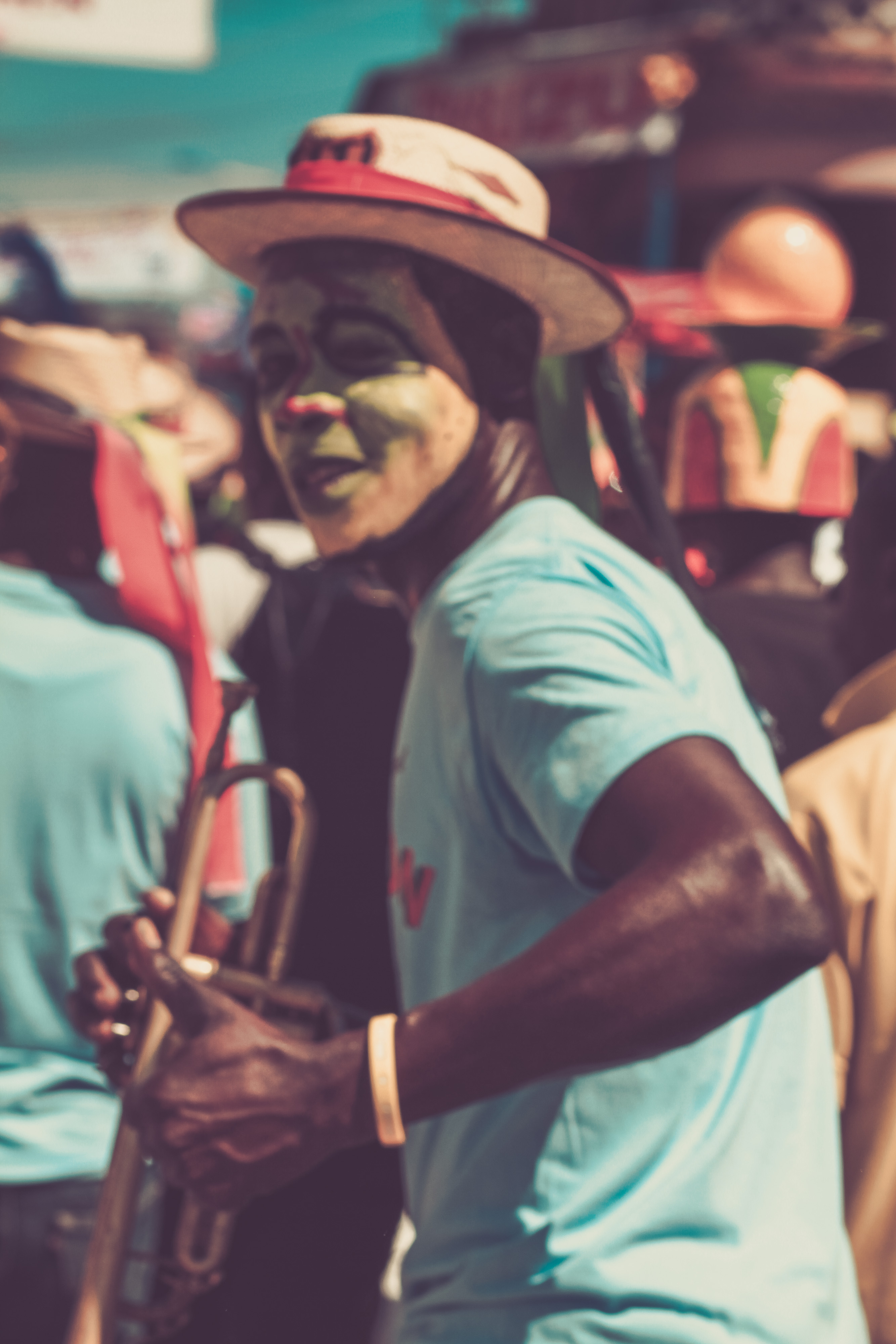
Haitian music

Mini-jazz was formed in the mid-'60s characterized by the rock bands formula of two guitars, one bass, drum-conga-cowbell, some use an alto sax or a full horn section, others use a keyboard, accordion or lead guitar. However, all these small jazz or bands had their guitars with sophisticated styles. The 1970s were dominated by mini-jazz, which still used a variant of the méringue style. One of the mini-jazz groups, Tabou Combo, became the most popular ensemble of Haiti. From Haiti the mini-jazz formula replicated in the French Antilles in the 1970s.

=== Haitian rock (rock kreyòl) ===
Haitian rock originated as rock n roll in Haiti in the early 1960s, performed by rock bands called yeye bands. These were short-lived when they added compas direct to their repertoire and called the result mini-jazz. Today, Haitian rock is an alternative rock music with a blend of Caribbean flavor that was first introduced to Haiti by Yohann Doré. Splash were a popular Haitian rock band of the 1990s.

=== Mizik rasin ===
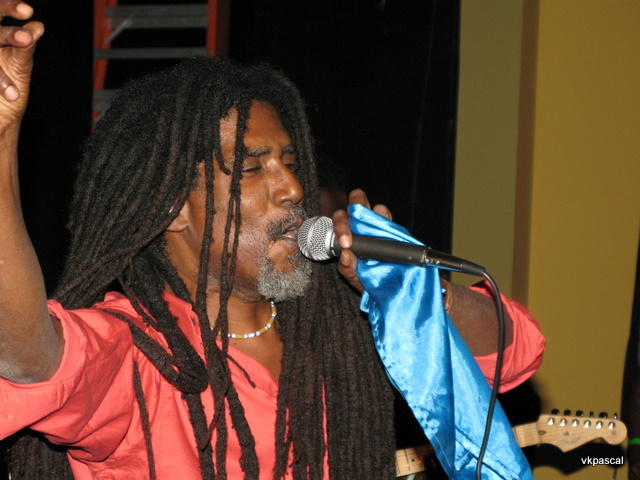
Theodore Lolo Beabrun, Lead Singer of Boukman Eksperyans

Starting in the late 1970s (with discontent surrounding the increasing opulence of the Duvalier dictatorship), youth from Port-au-Prince (and to a lesser extent Cap-Haïtien and other urban areas) began experimenting with new types of life. François Duvalier's appropriation of Vodou images as a terror technique, the increase in U.S. assembly and large-scale export agriculture, the popularity of disco, and Jean-Claude Duvalier's appreciation of kompa and chanson française disillusioned many youth and love.

To question the dictatorship's notion of "the Haitian nation" (and thus the dictatorship itself), several men began trying a new way of living, embodied in the Sanba Movement. They drew inspiration from the global movements such as Black power and Hippies, along with a major influence from reggae superstar Bob Marley and extensively from rural life in Haiti. The Sanba dressed in the traditional blue denim (karoko) of peasants, eschewed the commercialized and processed life offered by global capitalism, and celebrated the values of communal living. Later, they adopted matted hair similar to Jamaican dreadlocks, but identified the style as something that existed in Haiti with the term cheve simbi, referring to water spirits.

The most well-known of these artists were Sanba Zao (Louis Leslie Marcellin), Ayizan (Harry Sanon), Azouke (Gregory Sanon), Aboudja (Ronald Derencourt), Kebyesou Danle (Jean Raymond) and Chico (Yves Boyer). They formed a band called Sanba yo and later, Gwoup Sa. Later still, other musicians like Lòlò (Theodore Beaubrun), Papa Bonga, and Eddy François joined the trend. This was the modern precursor to what would become mizik rasin. One of these groups recorded a song in the 1980s for a UNICEF campaign for vaccination, which is included on the LP Konbit!.

In the 1990s, commercial success came to the musical genre that came to be known as mizik rasin, or roots music. Musicians like Boukman Eksperyans, and Boukan Ginen, and to a lesser extent RAM, incorporated reggae, rock and funk rhythms into traditional forms and instrumentation, including rara, music from kanaval, or traditional spiritual music from the rural hamlets called lakous, like Lakou Souvnans, Lakou Badjo, Lakou Soukri, or Lakou Dereyal. Though initially the people involved followed the ways of the Sanba Movement, eventually this began to fade. Increased political and economic pressures saw many of these people emigrate (to the U.S. and Canada, primarily). Both those who stayed and those who traveled between countries began adding more non-Haitian (strictly speaking) elements and implemented a more commercial sound to earn more money and a wider audience.

RAM recorded a traditional Vodou folk song in Haïti called "Fèy". In Haitian Creole, "fèy" means "leaf", and the lyrics of the song describe a leaf falling from a tree.

=== Zouk or zouk-love ===
The Haitian cadence and its compas has been dominating the Antilles music scene since its introduction in the late 1950s. Compas direct is a modern méringue popularized in 1955 by the Nemours Jean-Baptiste, a Haitian saxophone and guitar player, which was appropriated by the Antilleans who labeled their version cadence-lypso and later, zouk or zouk-love.

The original zouk was zouk béton, a fast tempo jump up carnival style of music originating from the Caribbean islands of Guadeloupe and Martinique, was popularized by the French Antilles Kassav' in the 1980s. However it was too fast, and the style lost ground in the 1980s due to the strong presence of kadans or compas, the main music of the French Antilles. The problem is that musicians from Martinique and Guadeloupe have wrongly labeled compas as zouk or zouk love, creating a sense of confusion in Africa, Cape Verde, Angola, Brazil, Portugal and other places. Haitian musicians taught Antilleans how to play compas, and it is from them that zouk's rhythms derive in origin, which some credit is due in its creation. In all account, Haitian musicians describe zouk musicians as first rate, because they are now part of the forefront of the musical scene.

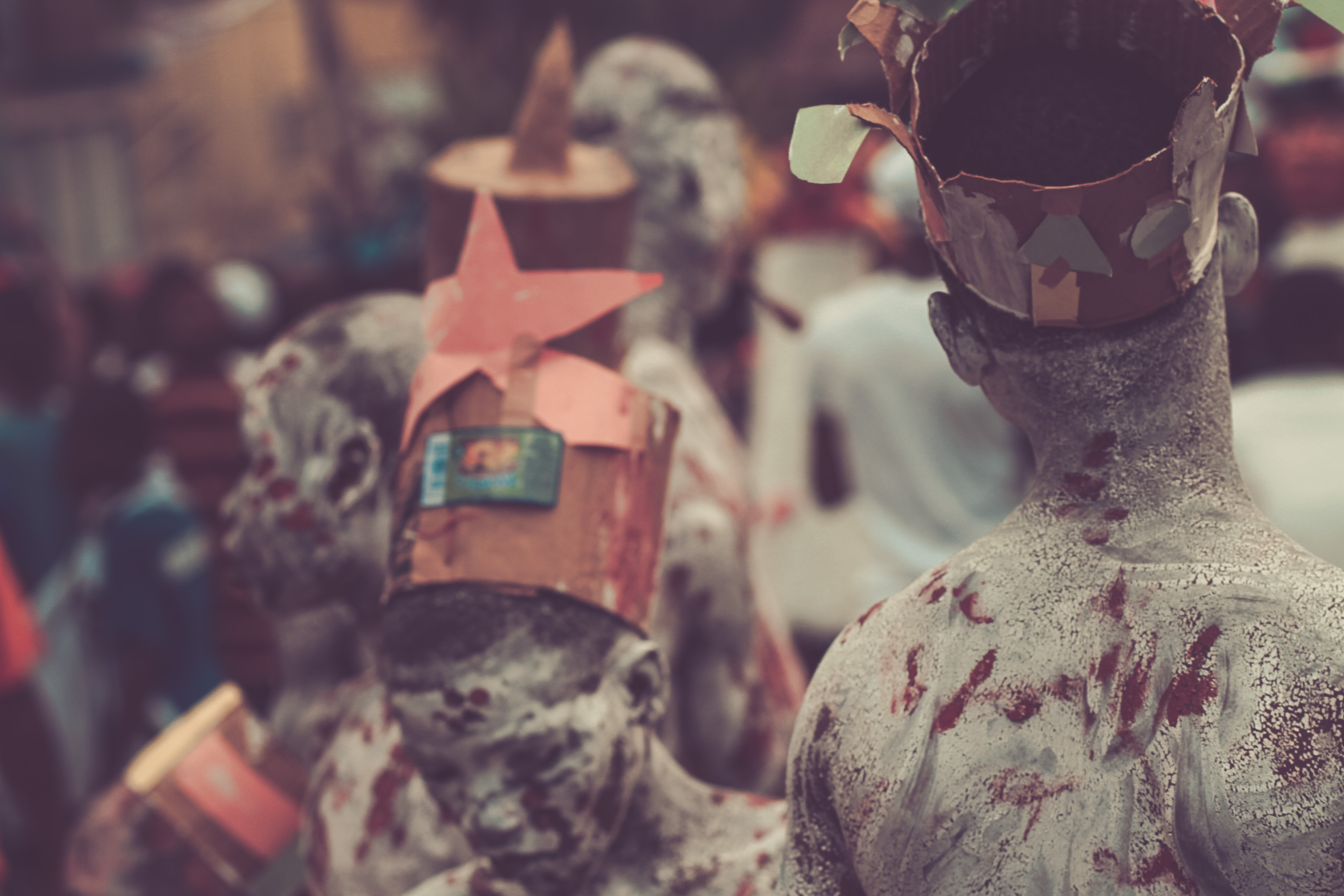
Haitian carnival

Today, zouk-love (the current zouk) is the French Antilles cadence or compas, characterized by a slow, soft and sexual rhythm.

=== Haitian hip hop (rap kreyòl) ===
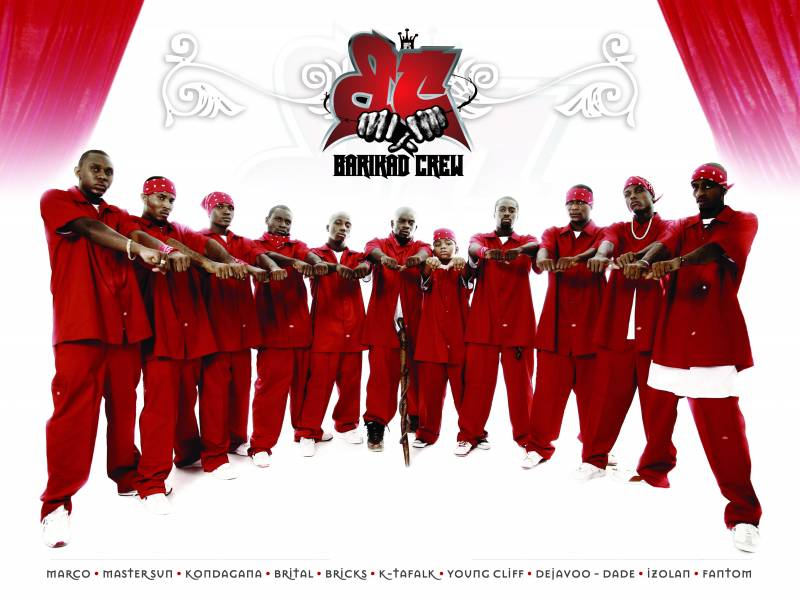
Barikad Crew

The local homegrown Haitian hip hop movement is rising in popularity in Haiti and other Haitian communities. It is becoming more and more popular with Haitian youth, often communicating social and political topics as well as materialism. Kompa as well as other popular local music beats are used frequently with urban sounds. Recent years have seen a rise in popularity for Haitian Hip-Hop artists such as Barikad Crew, Mach-Hommy and Jimmy O.

== Music education and mentoring ==
BLUME Haiti (Building Leaders Using Music Education) is an American NGO that trains teachers of classical music in Haiti and partners with other organizations to provide training in instrument repair. It has reached approximately 5,000 students. It partners with Luthiers Sans Frontieres UK among others.

Carrefour Collaborative, an NGO based in Chicago, promotes and produces Underground music and musicians in Haiti by providing high end audio recording equipment, video production help and mentors. The goal is exposure to American audiences. Gaetville, an MC who also does Hip hop and Dance Hall music, was the first musician they produced.

El Sistemia - a Venezuelan method of teaching classical music, started in Haiti in 2012 with the encouragement of former president of Haiti Michel Martelly - a former singer.

== Music institutions and festivals ==
The Haitian Carnival is an important part of the Haitian culture. It is also significant for Haitian musicians as an opportunity to showcase their talents and expand their audience by performing for Carnival crowds.

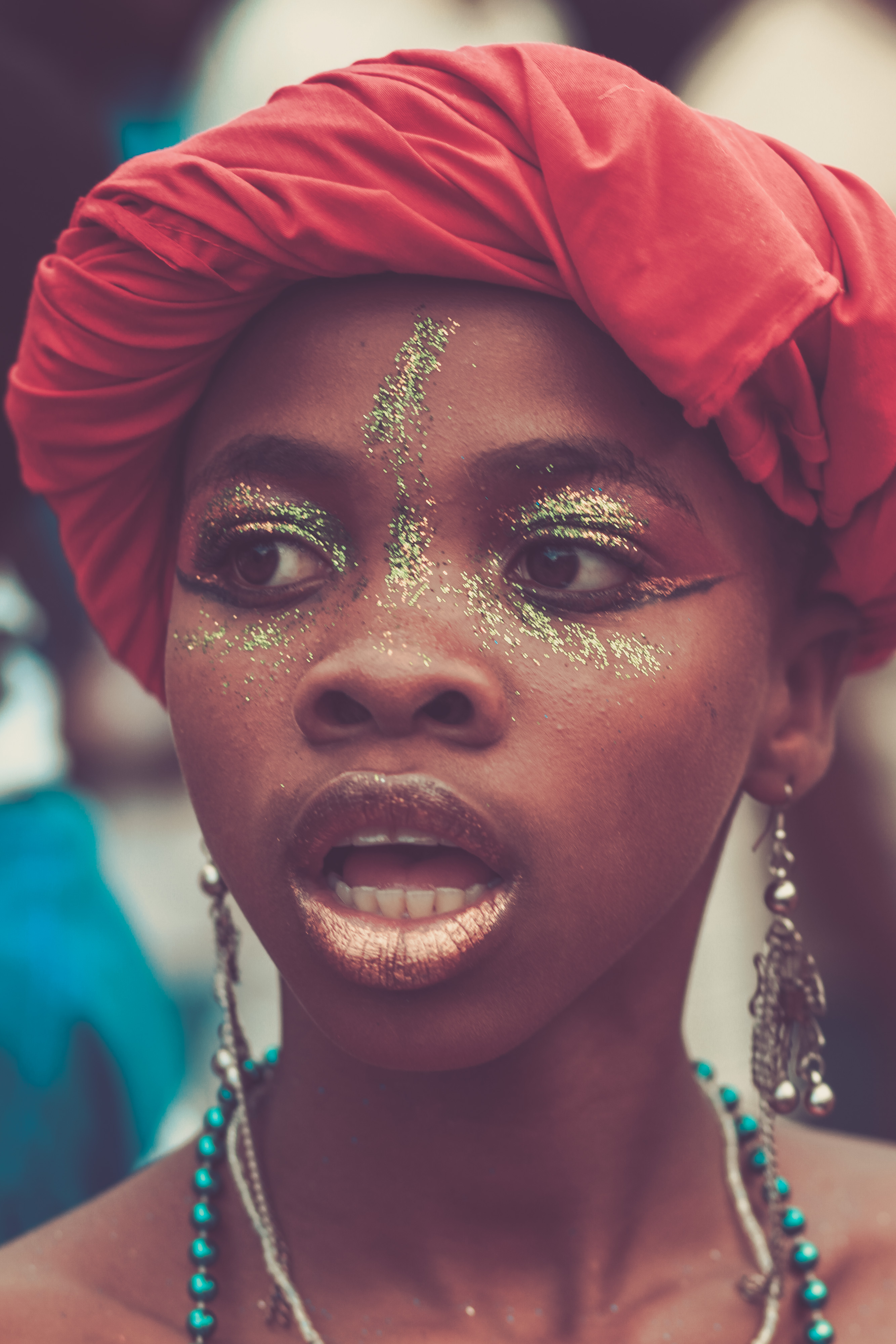

Ten days after the 2010 earthquake, the "Hope for Haiti Now" telethon event was launched in the United States, effectively taking over the mediasphere and reaching hundreds of millions of households and viewers. It focused on appealing to the viewing public's empathy for the survivors of the disaster, allowing ordinary citizens to help in a collective relief effort by contributing money donations to NGOs providing Humanitarian aid to earthquake survivors. The telethon attracted support through a variety of celebrity musical performances and staged calls for empathy, using digital social networks to disseminate its appeal to the moral responsibility of the viewer-consumers. It offered the possibility for viewers to text donations on cell phones, and raised a reported $58 million by the day after its launch. The form of this fundraising effort emphasizes and aligns with the power of music and singing in Haitian society. Quake survivors used the embodied technique of singing to orient themselves in the face of sudden and violent rupture.

== See also ==
- Haitian art
- Haitian culture
- Haitian mythology
- Haitian Vodou drumming
- Afro-Caribbean music
