= Richard Morse =

Richard Morse may refer to:

- Richard Auguste Morse (born 1957), Haitian-American musician and manager
- Richard McGee Morse (1922–2001), scholar and professor at Columbia University
- Richard S. Morse (1911–1988), scientist and inventor of Minute Maid orange juice
- Richard E. Morse (1809–1864), American physician, politician, and diplomat
