= Haitian Carnival =

Annual celebrations in Haiti

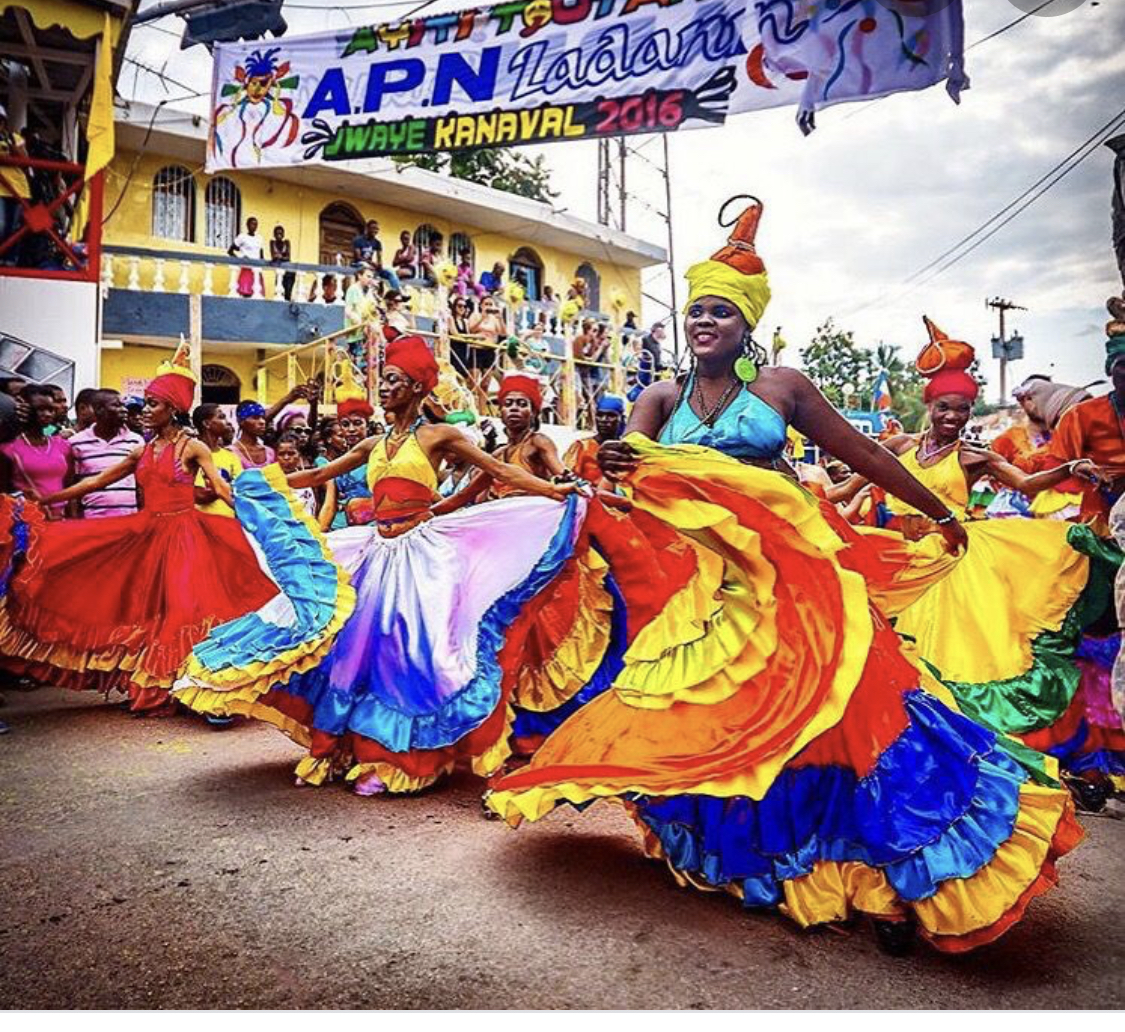
Haitian Carnival (Kanaval)

Haitian Carnival (Haitian Creole: Kanaval, French: Carnaval) is a celebration held over several weeks each year leading up to Mardi Gras. Haitian Defile Kanaval is the Haitian Creole name of the main annual Mardi Gras carnival held in Port-au-Prince, Haiti.

The parade is known as "Kye Marn". Haiti's largest carnival is held in the capital and largest city, Port-au-Prince, with smaller celebrations taking part simultaneously in Jacmel, Aux Cayes, and other locations in Haiti. The annual carnival celebrations coincide with other Mardi Gras carnivals around the world.

Haiti also has smaller carnival celebrations during the year that are separate from the main carnival. These include Rara, a series of processions taking place during the Catholic Lent season, that has bands and parades like the larger main carnival, and also an annual Carnaval des Fleurs, that takes place on 7 July.

== Carnival ==
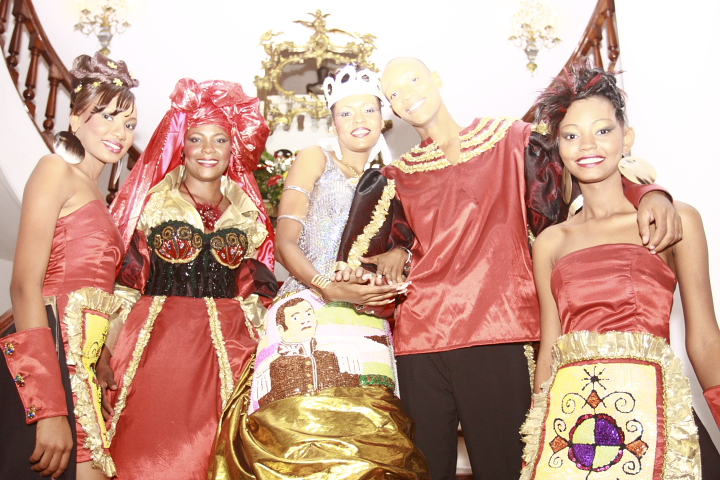
Carnival 'Royalty' in Port-au-Prince

Port-au-Prince's annual carnival is one of the largest Mardi Gras carnivals in the Caribbean and North America. The celebrations are funded by the government, businesses and wealthy Haitian families. Haiti's version of carnival season always starts in January, known as Pre-Kanaval, and the main carnival begins in February each year. Carnival celebrations end on Mardi Gras, which is French for Fat Tuesday, also known as Shrove Tuesday. Mardi Gras is the Tuesday before the Roman Catholic holiday known as Ash Wednesday. Ash Wednesday marks the beginning of the Lenten season, a somber period of fasting and penance that precedes Easter for Catholics.

The first Mardi Gras celebrations in Europe were a carnivalesque opportunity for people to indulge themselves, celebrate, and even subvert authority in a permissible way, as part of the party. Mardi Gras enabled people to enjoy the pleasures of life before the beginning of the Catholic Lent season, a period of 40 days and nights of fasting and penance leading up to Easter. The Catholic festival was imported to Haiti and elsewhere in the Americas during European settlement. In Haiti, carnival is also heavily influenced by local customs, such as Vodou religious rituals, and Haitian music.

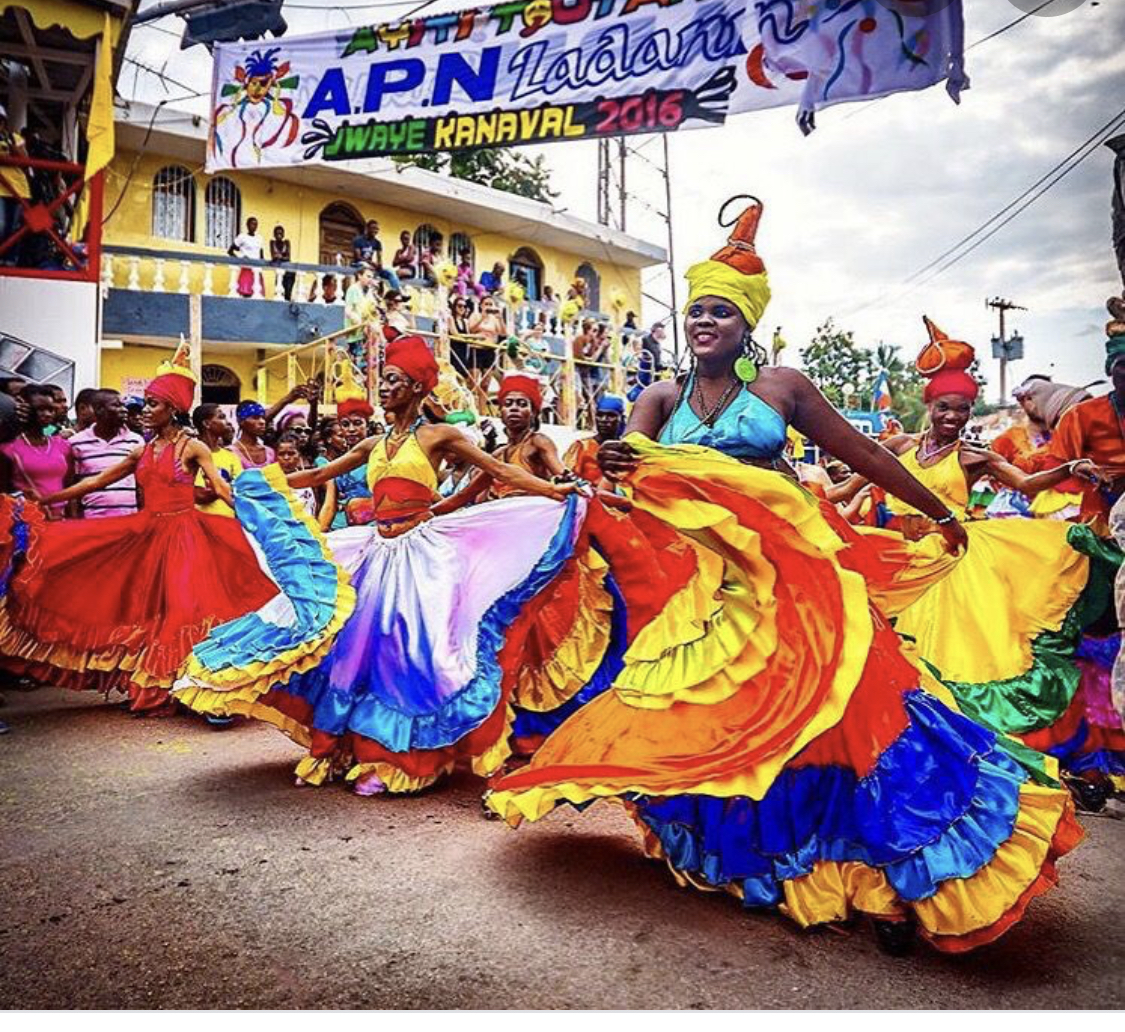
Haitian Carnival (Kanaval)

The carnival is celebrated with music, bands and parades. Parades have floats, sometimes with children participating in the celebrations. The floats typically have sound systems set up on trucks to play music to the crowds. Food stands selling barbecued treats and rum are a popular part of celebrations. There are also comedy plays put on by the carnival participants, often satirizing political topics. Revelers wear masks and costumes, as they do at other carnival celebrations in the Caribbean, North America, and Central and South America. The parades makes their way through the streets of Port-au-Prince and end with celebrations at the large plaza, Champ de Mars, located across from the Palais national (National Palace), the former residence of Haiti's president.

Music is central to Haiti's carnival. Musicians perform zouk, rap kreyòl (rap), konpa (Compas), and mizik rasin. The carnival is the largest annual event where bands can gain more public exposure and it provides the opportunity to perform at large concerts. Popular kompa bands participate in the carnival, such as T-Vice, Djakout No. 1, Sweet Micky also known as Michel Martelly, Kreyòl La, D.P. Express, Mizik Mizik, Ram, T-Micky, Team Lòbèy, Carimi, and Scorpio Fever who perform for dancers in the streets of Champ de Mars. In Haiti there are also competitions between some bands, like T-Vice, Djakout No. 1, Kreyòl La, Team Lòbèy, and Krezi Mizik.

Every year, tourists travel to Haiti's carnival to enjoy it.

== History ==
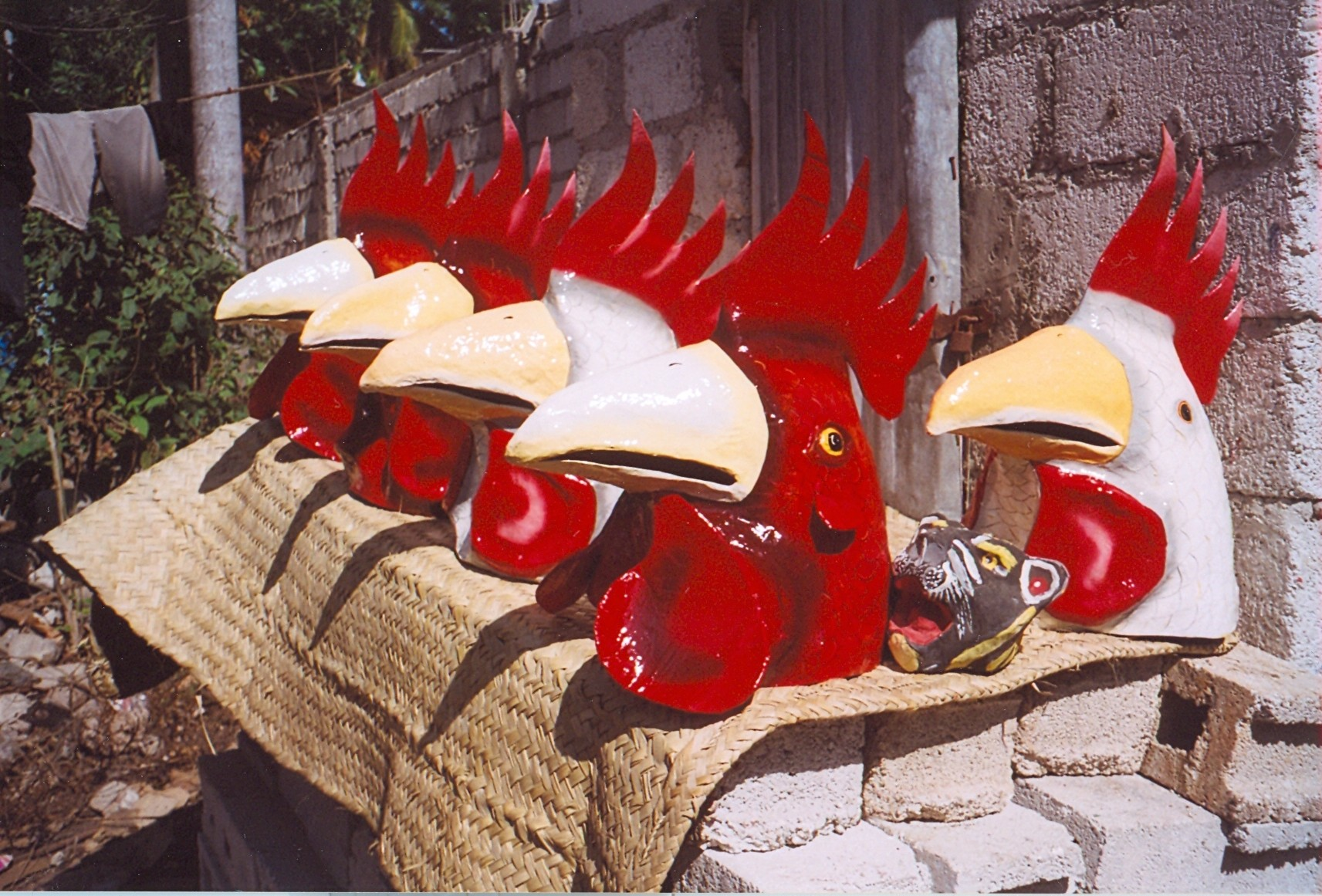
Carnival masks made of papier-mâché being prepared in Jacmel, 2002.

The large official public celebration of carnival in Haiti started in 1804 in the capital of Haiti, Port-au-Prince.

Carnival celebrations were traditionally considered "sinful" to Protestant Haitians, who were advised by their ministers not to participate. The celebrations were criticized for condoning sexually-suggestive dancing, profanity-filled plays, music lyrics mocking authority, and Vodou and kompa music rhythms.

In 1998, during first and second day of the Carnival, Manno Charlemagne, the newly elected Fanmi Lavalas mayor of Port-au-Prince, sent armed men to the Oloffson to dismantle the float on which RAM was scheduled to perform in the annual Carnival 1998, which was known to be the best Carnival organized since 1985. The mayor had taken offense to the lyrics of one of the band's songs, which he interpreted as an accusation of corruption. In a compromise, the band was allowed to perform on a flatbed truck. However, the brakes on the truck were sabotaged and during the procession, the truck swerved into the crowd, killing eight and forcing the members of the band to flee for their lives.

Celebrations were greatly curtailed by the 2010 Haiti earthquake, although they still took place on a much-reduced scale, with only one quarter of the usual budget. There was disagreement among Haitians about whether or not it was appropriate to have the carnival at all in early 2011. The 2011 carnival featured many costumed performers satirizing darker themes than usual, such as the post-earthquake cholera epidemic and the need for humanitarian relief. In 2012, the carnival was held on a larger scale and was a success.

In 2015, celebrations were cancelled nationwide after the second day due to an accident during the defile that claimed the lives of 18 people and injured 78 more.

== Creole carnival expressions ==
Haitian Creole, largely based on the French vocabulary, with influences from African, Spanish, Portuguese and Carib languages, has a variety of expressions associated with its carnival celebrations. Its celebrations give revelers an opportunity to throw away their inhibitions, and the expressions encourage this:

- lage kò w: "let go of yourself"
- mete men n anlè: "put your hands in the air"
- balanse: "sway"
- bobinen: "spin"
- souke: "shake"
- sote: "jump up"
- gouye: "grind your hips"
- vole: "jump up"

Musicians from the Haitian diaspora in New York City and elsewhere often return to Haiti to perform at the carnival.

There are also one-on-one fights between young men during the festivities. These are called gagann. Combatants are surrounded by a semi-circle of supporters.

== Rara ==
Haiti has a unique traditional carnival, Rara, that is separate from the main pre-Lent carnival celebrations. Rara processions take place during the day and sometimes at night during Lent, then culminate in a week-long celebration that takes place at the end of Lent, during the Catholic "Holy Week", which includes the Easter holiday. Rara has its roots in Haiti's an deyò areas, the rural areas around Port-au-Prince. It is based on peasant Easter celebration customs. Rara celebrations include parades with musicians playing drums, tin trumpets, bamboo horns called vaksens, and other instruments, and their style of music is likewise called rara music. Parades also include dancers and costumed characters such as Queens (called rèn), Presidents, Colonels, and other representatives of a complex rara band hierarchy, similar to the krewe organization of New Orleans Mardi Gras bands.

Rara is called "Vodou taken on the road" by Haitians. Processions of female dancers follow male Vodou religious leaders, accompanied by drummers and vaksen bands, stopping at crossroads, cemeteries, and the homes of community leaders. Rara rituals are public acknowledgements of the power of local "big men" in the communities. Money is given to the leaders of rara organizations and communities during processions. The incorporation of military costumes and dance steps in rara processions is also an acknowledgement of the community hierarchy, and the folk belief that Vodou rituals, including rara, supported the success of the Haitian Revolution, and the continued well-being of Haiti. Rara band members believe that they have made a contract with spirits, and must perform for 18 years. If not, the sprits grow upset with them, and they will suffer a really slow, painful death.

== Carnaval des Fleurs ==
Michel Martelly organized another carnival 29–31 July 2012 called Carnaval des Fleurs (Flower Carnival). This event included popular local konpa bands. This event supposedly originated in earlier times, but no such Carnival celebration had been held since (at least) the transition to democracy in 1986.

== Koudyay ==
Koudyay is a type of spontaneous celebration in Haiti, similar to a carnival celebration. During Haiti's years under the dictatorship of Papa Doc Duvalier, the government sponsored koudyaye festivities as a means to distract the people of Haiti from economic and political problems, and to give a limited, sanctioned way for people to release frustrations and avert rioting.

== Kompa carnival bands ==
Carnival is an important commercial event for Haitian musicians. Musicians have an opportunity to expand their audience by performing for crowds during the 3 days prior to Ash Wednesday. While Carnival bands can integrate many styles of music, compas is a common form used. In Haitian Creole, it is spelled konpa.

== See also ==
- Carnival
- Carnivalesque
- Compas
- Haitian Vodou drumming
- Labor Day Carnival
- Mardi Gras
- Music of Haiti
- Vodou
