= Twoubadou =

Haitian music genre

- Stylistic origins: Méringue combined with Cuban guajiro traditions
- Cultural origins: Early 20th Century, Haiti
- Typical instruments: Guitar; accordion; tanbou; maracas; lamellophone; bass; banza; graj; beatboxing

Regional scenes
- North America (esp. Haiti, French West Indies and Dominica); France

Twoubadou (Haitian Creole pronunciation: [twubadu]; French: Troubadour) music is a popular genre of guitar-based music from Haiti that has a long and important place in Haitian culture. The word comes from troubadour, a medieval poet-musician who wrote and sang songs about courtly love. Like the troubadours of old, the Haitian twoubadou is a singer-composer who accompanies himself on songs that tell about the bitterness and humor of love, often using risqué or suggestive lyrics.

== History ==
Twoubadou was developed in the early 20th century. It combined music derived from the guajiro traditions of Cuba, (which is related to the jibaro musical tradition of Puerto Rico) with a Haitian musical style called méringue. Twoubadou was brought back by Haitian migrant laborers who went to work as cutters on sugar plantations in Cuba who traveled back and forth to harvest the seasonal crop at the turn of the century. The instruments in the ensemble are portable, since most twoubadou had to carry all of their possessions back and forth between Haiti and the sugarcane fields abroad. It is characterized by the use of the following acoustic instruments such as an acoustic guitar or two, an accordion, and percussion instruments. It also features a pair of maracas or a graj (scraper), a tanbou (barrel drum), and a large lamellophone, with three to five keys called manibula, maniba, or malimba, (depending on the geographic region) that provides the sound of a bass guitar. True to the original Spanish troubadours, the music and its lyrics usually conjured up images of true love and lasting relationships.

Haitians have been part of a network of migrant labor since the late eighteenth century, when Haitian workers routinely to Cuba to participate in the sugarcane harvest which was most successful in the Caribbean after the independence of Haiti of 1804 (formerly known as Saint-Domingue) when its production topped the world. Haitian migrants have also shaped the musical styles in the areas where they worked. Tumba francesa is the Cuban term for Haitian-derived recreational drumming and dancing; the style is still practiced among expatriate Haitian cane cutters.

== Origins ==
The structure of the twoubadou song is a simple two-part, verse–chorus form. In Haiti, twoubadou is beloved by the people as their national music, but it is nearly unknown in the rest of the world.

The type of performer designated by the term twobadou changed over time. Gage Averill has described the singer Auguste de Pradines (1879–1947), widely known by the name Kandjo, as an archetype of the meaning of the term as it evolved in the twentieth century:

Kandjo fashioned a career that mixed bitter social satire ("Pa fe m sa"), patriotism, and tender local themes ("Erzulie") on a musical platform that combined French chanson, Haitian mereng, and Haitian traditional-style melodies. With his knack for capturing popular sentiments, he won for himself a devoted audience that spanned urban and rural environments (he sang at many rural fèt chanpèts) and all social classes. Although the term twoubadou was used at the time only for itinerant singers and small bands that played for hand outs, it later came to be applied to the type of populist singer of topical merengs personified by Kandjo... Kandjo largely created this archetype of the Haitian troubadour.

== Popular culture ==
Mizik twoubadou (troubadour music) has always had a following in Haiti, especially in small nightclubs where combos of two guitars, maracas, tanbou, and a pair of vocalists serenade dancers with Haitian and Cuban music. Perhaps the most famous contemporary component of the twoubadou style among popular entertainers in the latter twentieth century was Jean-Gesner Henry, better known as Coupé Cloué was renowned for his sexually suggestive lyrics. Recently, commercial artists have embraced the twoubadou sound, releasing several albums in recent years that foreground the guitar and the rhythms of Cuban music. One of the most successful releases is Haitiando, a three-CD series of Cuban music translated into Kreyòl and sung to the music of the two-guitar ensemble. The Haitiando series makes the often forgotten connection between Haitian and Cuban music explicit with their translations of popular Cuban songs in Kreyòl.

Although more popular during times past, today it is sometimes considered passé (old-fashion) or only for the old folks. Although more recently, it has begun being eclipsed by more popular forms of rasin and kompa music, it is making a comeback even among groups like Mizik Mizik. The song "Blakawout" from their album of in 1999 has made this a popular form of music among the younger crowds. Troubadours perform in small ensembles and can be found in larger restaurants, playing requests for patrons for small donations, or performing outdoors for celebrations.

Some renowned compas bands and musicians have incorporated twoubadou into some of their songs. The 56th President of Haiti, Michel Martelly's (known by his stage name Sweet Micky) Pa Manyen Fanm Nan, Alan Cavé's Ma Rose, Mikaben's Ou Pati, and T-Vice's Tu Me Touches, were all hits.

Twoubadou groups can be heard in Haiti at fèt patwonal (patron’s day feasts), during Carnival, at private parties, and in hotels and restaurants frequented by tourists.

== See also ==
- Charanga
- Danzón
- Habanera
- Haitian Creole
- Haitian Vodou drumming
- Mambo
- Music of Cuba
- Tumba francesa
- Salsa music
- Son Cubano
- Sugar plantations
