= Stevenson Magloire =

Haitian painter

Stevenson Magloire (August 16, 1963 – October 9, 1994) was a painter born in Pétion-Ville, Haiti. He is the son of artist Louisiane Saint Fleurant, a founder of the School of Soleil art movement. Magloire's paintings are bold and expressionistic, frequently incorporating people, birds, and Vodou and Christian symbolism.

== Background ==
Magloire was named after Adlai Stevenson, a politician in the United States. Uncommon in Haiti, his given name was so frequently misspelled as "Stivenson" by registration clerks and school officials, that he eventually used that spelling himself. Magloire was the son of another famous Haitian artist, Louisiane Saint Fleurant, and his brother, Ramphis, also chose art as an avocation. Already a collectable artist by the mid-1990s, Magloire was assassinated on October 9, 1994. He was stoned to death by paramilitary attachés of the Raoul Cédras military junta while walking on the street in Port-au-Prince. His death was memorialized by his friend, Richard A. Morse, in the ballad Ayizan, released by the rasin band RAM on their second album, Puritan Vodou, in 1997.
