= Beken =

Beken is a surname. Notable people with the surname include:

- Münir Nurettin Beken (born 1964), US-based Turkish ethnomusicologist
- Olive Beken (1897–1982), New Zealand landscape painter
