= Aubelin Jolicoeur =

Haitian journalist and columnist

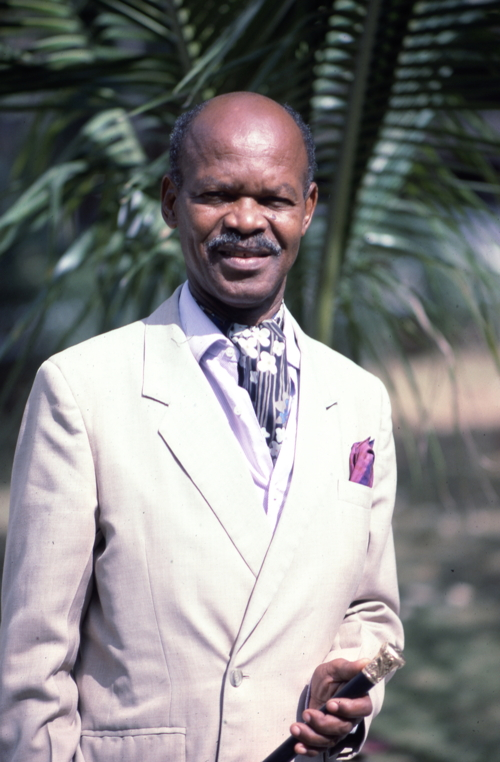
Aubelin Jolicoeur's Portrait

Aubelin Jolicoeur (30 April 1924 – 14 February 2005) was a Haitian journalist and columnist for Haiti's main newspaper Le Nouvelliste. Known as "Mr. Haiti", he was a dandy, art collector, and director of tourism. He was portrayed by Graham Greene in a novel, and mingled with celebrities who visited Haiti's landmark Hotel Oloffson. His heyday was the 1950s to 70s, and was a local institution into old age.

== Biography ==
Aubelin Jolicoeur was born on 30 April 1924 in Jacmel, to a French father and a Haitian mother. There were rumors that his mother went into labor at midnight while walking past a cemetery, where she gave birth. At age 19 he moved to the capital with no money or prospects, yet determined to "put Haiti on the map".

Jolicoeur began in the 1940s as a journalist and columnist for Le Nouvelliste, Haiti's largest newspaper. He wrote the column "Choses et gens" ("Things and People") that focused on the Haitian jet set, the lives of foreign celebrities passing through Haiti, and on Hatian society.

Jolicoeur frequented Port-au-Prince's landmark Hotel Oloffson for over 40 years. Described as the hotel's "palace gadfly", he was a "diminutive, squeaky-voiced, cane-twirling gossip columnist dandy". According to historian Georges Corvington, "the hotel can't be separated from the personality of Aubelin Jolicoeur. He animated the place. He cultivated a lot of acquaintances and was the center of the hotel. Foreign artists and celebrities came to see him. He was a celebrity in his own right." He wore white linen suits, paisley ascots, and carried a gold tipped cane. He wrote articles in Le Nouvelliste about the comings and goings of celebrity guests at the hotel. He would greet guests at the airport introducing himself as "Mr. Haiti".

He was the inspiration for the character Petit Pierre in Graham Greene's 1966 novel The Comedians, that also had the hotel as a central setting. After the novel's publication, Jolicoeur gained literary notoriety and he would mingle with journalists and other visitors at the hotel bar. In his obituary of Greene for the Guardian, Jolicoeur wrote: "I was grateful to Graham to have enhanced my legend to such an extent that some fans kneel at my feet or kiss my hand in meeting a man living his own legend." Michel Beaulieu, a confidant of Greene's, later said that "Graham Greene made Aubelin more famous than he was."

Jolicoeur was appointed by Duvalier as the director of the Haitian Tourist Office. He was also the director of the Ministry of Information under the government of General Henri Namphy (1986–1987).

Jolicoeur was a collector of Haitian paintings. The Haitian writer, Jean Métellus, recalled that French novelist André Malraux compared Aubelin Jolicoeur's art gallery to a museum.

Jolicoeur died in 2005, possibly of either Alzheimer's or Parkinson's disease, in a Port-au-Prince rooming house. He is buried in Jacmel, at the same cemetery where he was purportedly born, coming into life and going to death at the same place.
