= The Comedians (1967 film) =

1967 film by Peter Glenville based on the 1966 novel

- Film poster
- Directed by: Peter Glenville
- Written by: Graham Greene
- Based on: The Comedians; 1966 novel by Graham Greene
- Produced by: Peter Glenville
- Starring: Richard Burton; Elizabeth Taylor; Alec Guinness; Peter Ustinov; Paul Ford; Lillian Gish
- Cinematography: Henri Decaë
- Edited by: Aram Avakian
- Music by: Laurence Rosenthal
- Production companies: Metro-Goldwyn-Mayer; Maximillian Productions; Trianon Productions
- Distributed by: Metro-Goldwyn-Mayer
- Release dates: October 31, 1967 (NYC); November 1, 1967 (US)
- Running time: 160 minutes
- Country: United States
- Language: English
- Box office: $5,200,000 $2,600,000 (rentals)

The Comedians is a 1967 American political drama film based on a book by Graham Greene. It was directed and produced by British filmmaker Peter Glenville. Graham Greene wrote the screenplay. The stars were Richard Burton, Elizabeth Taylor, Peter Ustinov, and Alec Guinness. Paul Ford and Lillian Gish had supporting roles as a presidential candidate and wife, as did James Earl Jones as an island doctor.

Set in Haiti during the regime of François "Papa Doc" Duvalier, it was filmed in Dahomey (Benin since 1975). The film tells the story of a sardonic British hotel owner and his encroaching fatalism as he watches Haiti sink into barbarism and squalor under Duvalier.

== Plot ==
In Port-au-Prince, Haiti, Mr. Brown owns a hotel which he inherited from his mother. Returning from New York, where he tried unsuccessfully to sell the floundering business, Brown finds some clientele among his shipmates: Major Jones of England and Mr. and Mrs. Smith of the United States.

Jones has come to sell arms to the government, run by François "Papa Doc" Duvalier, but his contact has fallen out of favour so Jones is arrested, beaten, and jailed by Captain Concasseur. The Smiths have come to promote vegetarianism but their contact, the Minister of Public Welfare, has also run afoul of the regime and has killed himself at Brown's hotel to avoid being tortured by the Tontons Macoute, Duvalier's secret police.

At the centre of the story is Brown's ongoing affair with Martha Pineda, the wife of a South American ambassador to Haiti.

Brown tries to help his guests navigate the treacherous regime, and introduces the Smiths to the new minister, who becomes interested when he learns how much money they are willing to invest. But after the Smiths witness several atrocities of the Tontons, they become disenchanted and leave Haiti.

Major Jones is able to interest the government in his arms deal and he is released from jail. When it becomes apparent that he can't deliver on his promises, he has to go into hiding. Brown smuggles him into the Pinedas' embassy for refuge, outwitting the ever-watchful Tontons. Over several weeks, Jones establishes himself as an entertaining houseguest, raising the ire of the jealous Brown, who suspects Jones and Mrs. Pineda of starting an affair.

Captain Concasseur offers Brown money to drive Jones to the airport under safe conduct. Knowing of Brown's affair with Martha, he threatens the expulsion of the Pinedas unless Brown cooperates. Realizing Jones would be killed, Brown refuses.

Though Brown professes no interest in politics, he knows some of the people who are keen to overthrow Duvalier, including Henri Philipot, the nephew of the suicide minister, and Dr. Magiot. Philipot has a tiny army of would-be revolutionaries and Magiot wants Major Jones to train them. Martha helps smuggle Jones out of the embassy, but as Magiot has been killed by the Tontons it is Brown who drives Jones into the mountains to meet up with the rebels.

During the journey, Brown's suspicions about Jones and Martha seem to be confirmed by the boasts and innuendo of the inebriated Jones, but while they are waiting at the rendezvous Jones confesses to lying, not only about Martha but also his military service.

Captain Concasseur arrives and kills Jones. Brown is about to be shot but is saved by Philipot. For the sake of his men's morale, Philipot convinces Brown to take the place of Jones and join the rebels.

Because they aided Jones, the Pinedas must leave the country. Having heard reports of rebel casualties, Martha doesn't know if Brown is alive as she flies home with her husband.

== Cast ==
- Richard Burton as Brown
- Elizabeth Taylor as Martha Pineda
- Alec Guinness as Major Jones
- Peter Ustinov as Ambassador Pineda
- Georg Stanford Brown as Henri Philipot
- Roscoe Lee Browne as Petit Pierre
- Paul Ford as Mr. Smith
- Gloria Foster as Mrs. Philipot
- Lillian Gish as Mrs. Smith
- James Earl Jones as Dr. Magiot
- Zakes Mokae as Michel
- Douta Seck as Joseph
- Raymond St. Jacques as Captain Concasseur
- Cicely Tyson as Marie Therese

== Production ==
Because political conditions in Haiti made filming there impossible, location shooting took place in Dahomey (now Benin). Filming also took place on the Côte d'Azur in France. A short promotional documentary titled The Comedians in Africa was released in 1967, which chronicled the difficulties encountered by the on-location crew and cast.

The film featured a group of black American actors who would become famous into the 1970s: Raymond St. Jacques, James Earl Jones, and Cicely Tyson. Of these stars, both Tyson and Jones would be nominated for Academy Awards for other performances. Other black stars in the film included Zakes Mokae, Roscoe Lee Browne, Gloria Foster, and Georg Stanford Brown.

This was the final film directed by Glenville. Three years earlier he had directed Burton in an award-winning production of Becket. Glenville previously directed the premier of Graham Greene's first play, The Living Room, at Wyndham's Theatre in April 1953.

Several of the characters were based on historic people. The newspaper columnist Petit Pierre, for instance, was based on Aubelin Jolicoeur.

== Reception ==
The film was poorly received, despite the all-star cast. On Rotten Tomatoes it has an approval rating of 27% based on reviews from 11 critics.

Variety described the film as "plodding, low-key, and eventually tedious". Roger Ebert wrote in the Chicago Sun-Times that "the movie tries to be serious and politically significant, and succeeds only in being tedious and pompous", and denounced the "long, very wordy discussions". He said that "the atmosphere of the Caribbean is invoked convincingly". Leslie Halliwell called it "Clumsy and heavy-going ... Neither entertaining nor instructive, but bits of acting please." He also quoted part of a review by critic Stanley Kaufmann: " 'It's pleasant to spend two hours again in Greenland, still well-stocked with bilious minor crucifixions, furtive fornication, cynical politics, and reluctant hope.' " Bosley Crowther of The New York Times gave the film a mixed review, praising the atmosphere and some individual scenes, but writing:

"Mr. Greene's characteristic story of white men carrying their burdens cheerlessly and with an undisguised readiness to dump them as soon as they can get away from this God-forsaken place is no great shakes of a drama. It is conventional and obvious, indeed, and is rendered no better or more beguiling by some rather superfluous additions of amorous scenes".

The film received some recognition from several critics' circles. Lillian Gish received a Golden Globe nomination for Best Supporting Actress. Paul Ford won the 1967 National Board of Review Award for Best Supporting Actor for his role as Smith. Alec Guinness in his role as Jones tied with Robert Shaw in A Man for All Seasons for the 1968 Kansas City Film Critics Circle Award for Best Supporting Actor.

The film was not successful financially.

== See also ==
- List of American films of 1967
