= Atis Indepandan =

- Origin: Haiti
- Genres: Twoubadou
- Years active: 1975-
- Labels: Paredon Records, Folkways Records

Atis Indepandan (English: Independent Artists) is a New York–based music group that plays in a traditional Haitian troubadour style with influences from contemporary American folk music and Brazilian tropicália. They released two albums of Haitian protest songs: Haiti: Ki Sa Pou-N Fe? What is to Be Done? in 1975 and Haiti: Canti Di Lotta E Di Ribellione / Songs Of Struggle And Rebellion in 1976, during the repressive reign of Jean-Claude (“Baby Doc”) Duvalier. Their lyrics bear a strong socialist message, becoming a landmark in Haitian revolutionary music and reference during the struggle against the Duvalier dictatorship.

Atis Independan was founded from a first group called Vaksin-n (named after a bamboo flute). Throughout the 1960s, François Duvalier used the music of the time, inspired by English rock and French yéyé, to carry out propaganda that described Haiti as a paradise island with peaceful beaches while the country was dying of hunger and children no longer had access to school. Against this disinformation, Atis Independan gathered popular songs and music more attached to traditional forms, such as voodoo, rara, and biguine.

Haitian-American classical/folk musician Leyla McCalla covered the song "Dodinin (Rocking)" for her 2022 album Breaking the Thermometer.
