= Rabòday =

Music genre

- Stylistic origins: Rasin
- Cultural origins: Mid-2000s, Haiti
- Typical instruments: Tanbou, drums, modular synthesizer, percussion, personal computer

Haiti

Rabòday (pronounced [ɣabɔdaj]) is a rhythm of traditional dance music played to the drum and is arranged to electronic music.

== Etymology ==
First mentioned with Pouchon Duverger, the lead singer of Djakout in late 2000s. When Djakout music is performed in live events. Djakout music always plays short Raboday rhythm, with the help T Pouch, the keyboardist and T Reggie, the guitarist together they help created the sound of the Raboday. Pouchon Duverger always say ‘Men Raboday la’ each times you hear the keyboard or the guitar sound play. Pouchon Duverger is the creator of Raboday.

== Origins ==
Rabòday emerged in the mid-2000s and was inspired by Rasin music, which is the mixture of traditional Haitian rhythms and with pop-rock music since the 1980s. As in Rasin, Rabòday talks about society's problems. A high-octane mélange of electronic sounds, live syncopated rhythms and politically charged lyrics, Raboday music was spearheaded by Fresh La, Haitian pop singer and leader of the band Vwadèzil. It has become the defining sound of a generation of young Haitians recovering from a major natural disaster: the devastating 2010 earthquake.

== Rhythm ==
Rabòday has a 4/4 dance rhythm.
