= Magloire (disambiguation) =

Magloire is a Breton saint.

Magloire may also refer to:

- Magloire (surname), a surname
- Magloire Ambroise (1774–1807), Haitian rebel slave
- Saint-Magloire, Quebec, a town in Canada formerly known as Saint-Magloire-de-Bellechasse
