= Magloire (surname) =

Magloire is a surname. Notable people with the surname include:

- Jamaal Magloire (born 1978), Canadian professional basketball player
- Paul Magloire (1907–2001), President of Haiti
- Réjane Magloire (21st century), American singer
- Stevenson Magloire (1963–1994), Haitian artist
