= Hotel Oloffson =

Hotel in Port-au-Prince, Haiti

Coordinates: 18°31′46″N 72°20′15″W

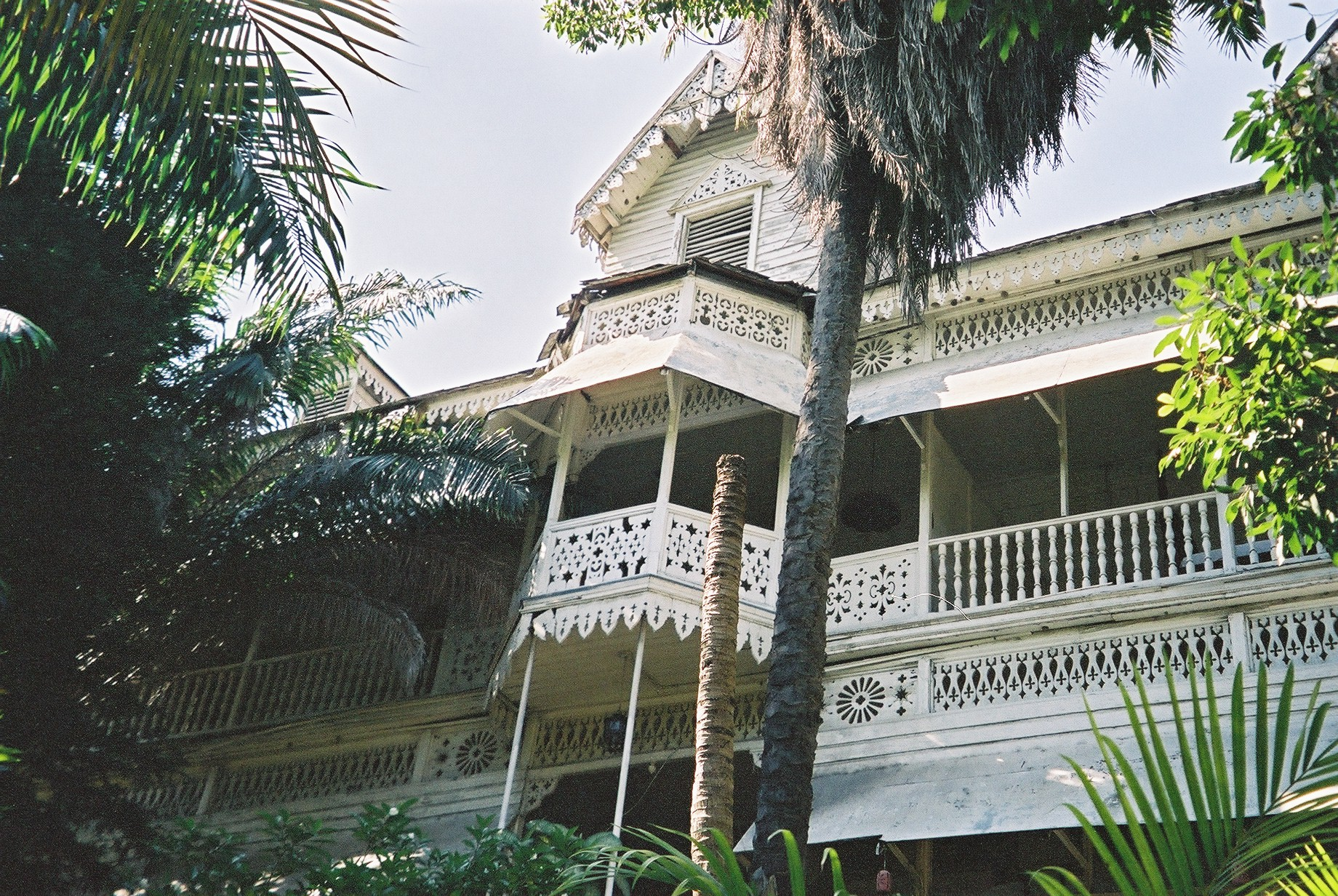

General information
- Location: 60 Avenue Christophe; Port-au-Prince, Haiti
- Opened: 1935
- Closed: 2025
- Owner: Richard A. Morse

Website
- www.hoteloloffson.com

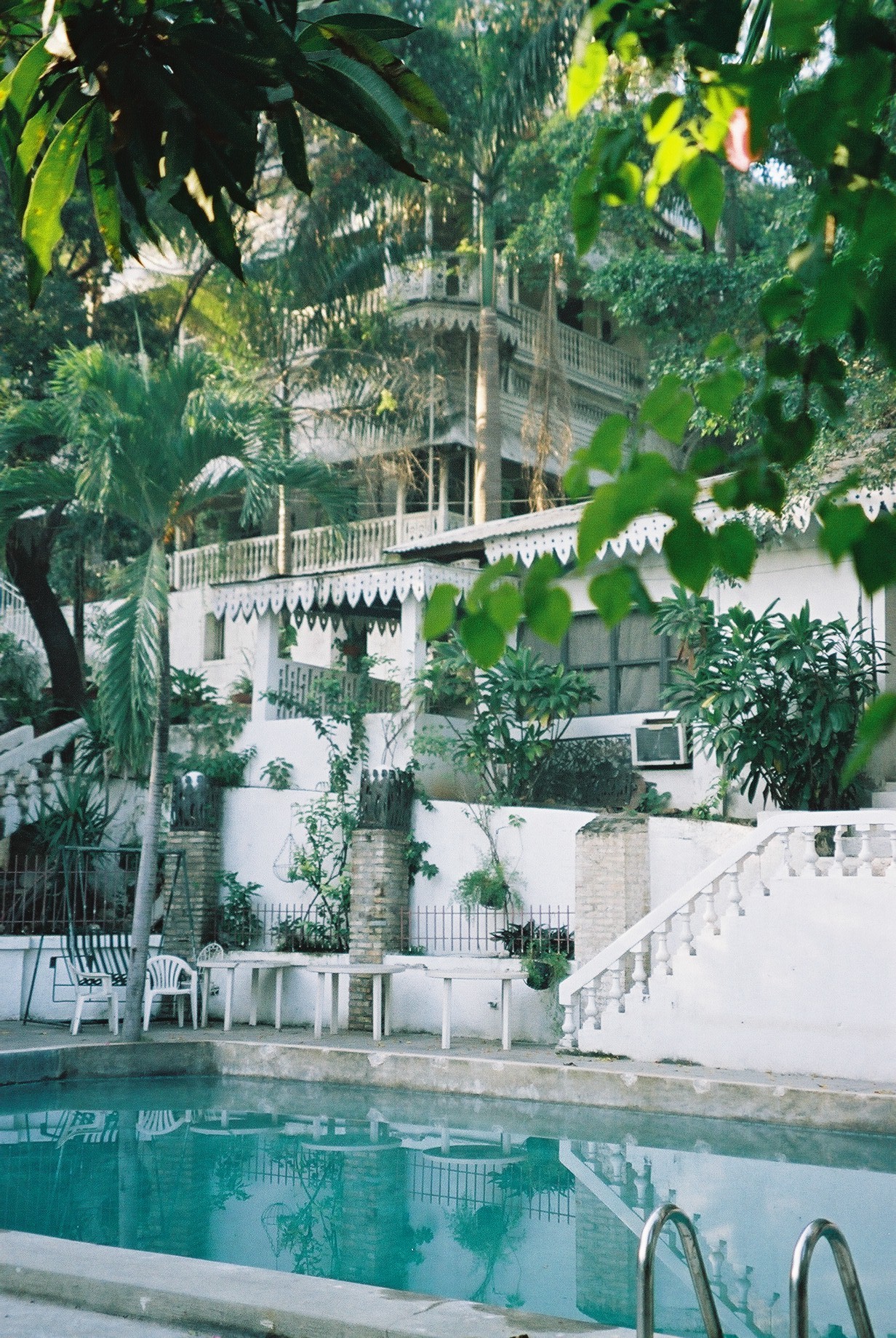
Poolside

The Hotel Oloffson was a hotel in central Port-au-Prince, Haiti. Originally a private mansion in the late 19th century, it was later made into a hotel; during its heyday it was known as the "Greenwich Village of the Tropics", hosting celebrity actors, writers, and artists, including Ernest Hemingway and Mick Jagger. The architecture was late-19th century tropical gingerbread house, a French-origin tropical mansion design. The hotel was the real-life inspiration for the hotel in Graham Greene's 1966 novel The Comedians.

On 6 July 2025, during a prolonged period of intense lawlessness and gang violence in Haiti, the hotel was incinerated by assailants from the Viv Ansanm gang coalition in an arson attack.

== Architecture ==
The main structure was a Haitian-style gingerbread house with wooden latticework, turrets and spires, set in a lush tropical garden. The style originated in the 1880s as an adaptation of a French resort style, suitable to Haiti's "hot climate ... with ornamental patterns adorning eaves and doors, decorative tile work on wide porches, and high ceilings and windows to allow for cross breezes." Graham Greene once wrote: "With its towers and balconies and wooden fretwork decorations it had the air at night of a Charles Addams house in a number of The New Yorker." Construction of gingerbread houses stopped in 1925 when wooden houses were banned in the city to reduce fires.

The hotel was surrounded by streets crowded with poor merchants and beggars, creating a contrast between wealth and privilege and the reality of Haiti. As of 2015, there were only 200 Haitian gingerbread houses still remaining in Port-au-Prince, with Hotel Oloffson the best-known example. They continue to be lost to natural disaster, neglect and malfeasance.

== History ==
=== Beginning ===
The building was constructed in 1887 as a private mansion, based on plans by a French architect named Lefèvre. It was built for the prestigious Sam family of Port-au-Prince, headed by Tirésias Simon Sam who was president of Haiti from 1896 to 1902. The mansion was commissioned by Tirésias's son, Demosthenes Simon Sam. The Sams lived in the mansion until 1915, when their cousin Vilbrun Guillaume Sam was selected to assume the post of president, the fifth president in five years. Guillaume would be president for a scant five months before he was executed by an angry mob. In the resulting power vacuum, U.S. President Woodrow Wilson – concerned about a Haitian coup by Rosalvo Bobo who was thought to be sympathetic to the Germans – ordered the United States Marine Corps to seize Port-au-Prince. The occupation would eventually extend to the entire nation of Haiti. The mansion was leased by the Sam family to the Marine Corp as a military hospital for the duration of the occupation from 1915 to 1934.

=== Hotel Oloffson ===
In 1935, when the occupation ended, the mansion was leased to Werner Gustav Oloffson, a Swedish sea captain from Germany, who converted the property into a hotel with his wife Margot and two sons Olaf and Egon. In the 1950s, Roger Coster, a French photographer, assumed the lease on the hotel and ran it with his Haitian wife, Laura. The hotel came to be known as the "Greenwich Village of the Tropics", attracting actors, writers, and artists. Some of the suites in the hotel were named after the artists and writers who frequented the hotel, including Graham Greene, James Jones, Charles Addams, and Sir John Gielgud.

An American Al Seitz acquired the hotel lease in 1960. During the 1970s and early 1980s, the hotel enjoyed a brief period of fame and good fortune. Celebrities such as Jacqueline Kennedy Onassis, Elizabeth Taylor and Mick Jagger were regular guests, and like Coster before him, Seitz named favorite rooms at the hotel after the celebrity guests. After Al Seitz died in 1982, his widow, the former Suzanne Laury, continued to operate it. As the grip of Jean-Claude Duvalier closed over the country however, the foreign tourist trade dried up. The hotel survived by serving as the desired residence for foreign reporters and foreign aid workers who needed secure lodging in the center of town.

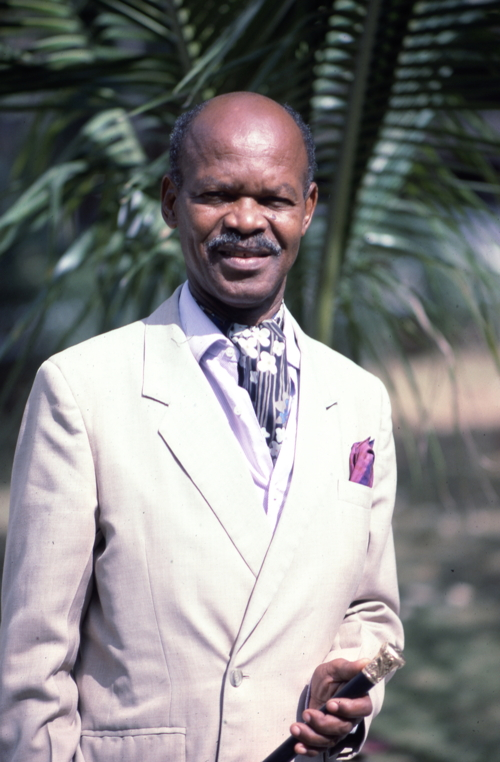
"The hotel can't be separated from the personality of Aubelin Jolicoeur. He animated the place." (quote by Georges Corvington)

In 1987, with the help of his half-brother Jean Max Sam, Richard A. Morse signed a 15-year lease to manage the Hotel Oloffson, then in near-ruins after the final years of Duvalierism. In restoring the business, Morse hired a local folkloric dance troupe and slowly converted it into a mizik rasin band. Richard Morse would become the songwriter and lead male vocalist and the name of the band, RAM, comes from his initials. The band became famous for their protest music during the Raoul Cédras military dictatorship from 1991 to 1994. Throughout the political upheaval of Haiti in the 1990s, RAM's regular Thursday evening performance at the hotel became one of the few regular social events in Port-au-Prince in which individuals of various political positions and allegiances could congregate. Regular attendees of the performances included foreign guests at the hotel, members of the military, paramilitary attachés and former Tonton Macoutes, members of the press, diplomats, foreign aid workers, artists, and businessmen.

The hotel was the frequent haunt of Aubelin Jolicoeur (1924-2005). Described as the hotel "palace gadfly", he was a "diminutive, squeaky-voiced, cane-twirling gossip columnist dandy". He wore white linen suits and carried a gold tipped cane. According to Port-au-Prince historian Georges Corvington, "the hotel can't be separated from the personality of Aubelin Jolicoeur. He animated the place. He cultivated a lot of acquaintances and was the center of the hotel. Foreign artists and celebrities came to see him." His heyday was the 1950s through 70s when he wrote articles about the comings and goings of celebrity guests, later becoming something of a local institution who met guests at the airport.

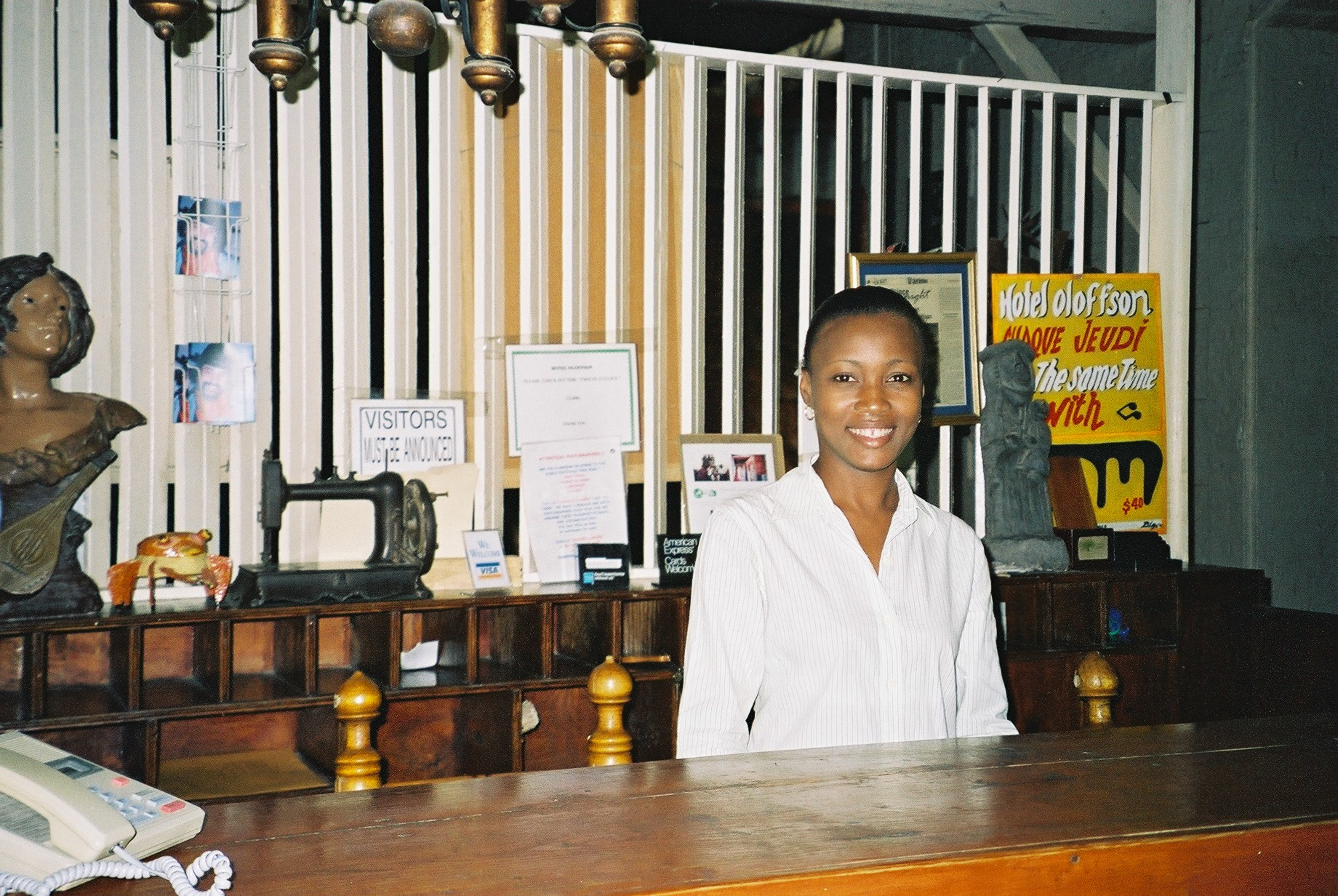
The hotel front desk in 2007.

During the 12 January 2010, earthquake, the Hotel Oloffson was damaged. US photographer Tequila Minsky who was also staying in the Oloffson, told the New York Times that a wall at the front of the Hotel Oloffson had fallen, killing a passer-by, and that several neighboring buildings had collapsed. Richard Morse, using the social networking site Twitter, was a major source of news coming out of the disaster area in the early hours. In a Twitter post from 12 January, he states "Our guests are sitting out in the driveway.. no serious damage here at the Oloffson but many large buildings nearby have collapsed." The hotel was one of Port-au-Prince's only hotels left standing and the worldwide media subsequently decamped to the hotel and its grounds because it had a functioning Wi-Fi hotspot.

=== Decline and destruction ===
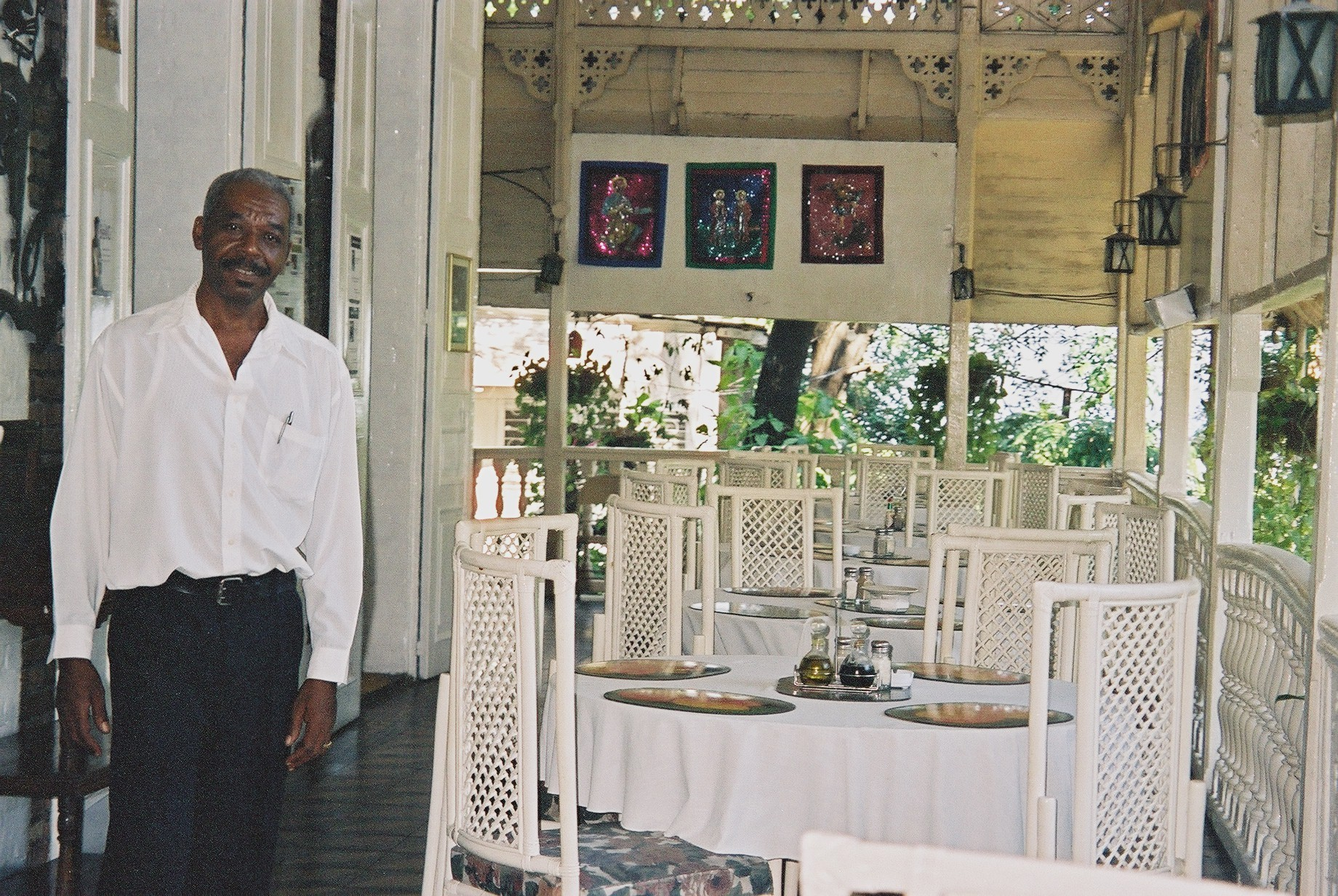
Everything in the building, including antique furniture such as this was destroyed

By 2018, the hotel's domain name hoteloloffson.com had stopped working. The continued deterioration of government security in Port-au-Prince amid the gang war, and a move to the United States by owner Richard A. Morse in October 2022, left the hotel in a vulnerable position. It stopped accepting guests around July 2024 out of concerns for safety. In March 2025, gangs breached the hotel's interior courtyard; police and a neighborhood self-defense brigade temporarily pushed them back. The remaining skeleton staff of three was soon forced to flee. On 6 July 2025, the now abandoned hotel was completely destroyed in a devastating arson attack. The details of who was responsible and why are unknown, however the city at the time was under the control of warring Haitian gangs.

== Cultural influences ==
The Hotel Oloffson was the inspiration for the fictional Hotel Trianon in Graham Greene's 1966 novel about Duvalierist Haiti, The Comedians. The New Yorker cartoonist Charles Addams, reportedly modeled his trademark haunted houses cartoons on "the Oloffson’s tropo-Gothic gingerbread façade." The Hotel Oloffson is featured in Max Hardberger's auto-biography SEIZED! A Sea Captain's Adventures Battling Scoundrels and Pirates While Recovering Stolen Ships in the World's Most Troubled Waters. In 2011, the Hotel Oloffson was featured prominently in an episode of Anthony Bourdain's travel television show Anthony Bourdain: No Reservations. The Hotel Oloffson is in the Kurt Vonnegut novel Deadeye Dick. The hotel appears throughout Bob Shacochis's novel The Woman Who Lost Her Soul.
