= Fèy =

"Fèy" is a traditional Vodou folk song in Haiti. In Haitian Creole, "fèy" means "leaf", and the lyrics of the song describe a leaf falling from a tree. Like many traditional songs in Vodou folklore, the lyrics of "Fèy" can hold many meanings, both religious and political. At least two mizik rasin bands in the 1990s sang adaptations of the traditional song. A version first performed by RAM in 1992 was banned throughout Haiti during the remaining years of the Raoul Cédras military junta.

In 1991, a military junta headed by Raoul Cédras seized power in a coup d'etat, overthrowing the elected president, Jean-Bertrand Aristide. RAM, a rasin band in Port-au-Prince, which had run afoul of military authorities before, first performed "Fèy" at the 1992 Carnival in Port-au-Prince, and then began to perform the song during their weekly concerts at the Hotel Oloffson. Despite no overt references to the political situation, a recording of the song was widely played on the radio and immediately taken up throughout the country as an unofficial anthem of support for Aristide. Playing or singing the song was soon banned under military authority, and RAM's leader, Richard A. Morse, was subjected to death threats from the regime. In September, 1994, U.S. military troops arrived to oust the Cédras regime and restore Aristide to his presidency. "Fèy" was released on RAM's first album, Aïbobo, in 1996.

== Lyrics ==
"Fèy" is a traditional Haitian vodou folklore song, and as such the lyrics are in the public domain. The Creole lyrics are as printed in the liner notes of RAM's first album, Aïbobo, and the English language translation is by Bob Shacochis.

Fèy yo gade mwen nan branch mwen,
yon move tan pase li voye'm jete.
Fèy yo gade mwen nan branch mwen,
yon move tan pase li voye'm jete.
Jou ou wè'm tonbe a, se pa jou a m'koule,
jou ou wè'm tonbe a, se pa jou a m'koule.
papa, le ya bezwen mwen
kote ya jwenn mwen.
Papa Bondye wo St. Nikola we,
Papa Bondye wo St. Nikola we,
yon sèl pitit gason m nan
yo fè'l kite peyi a l'ale...

I'm a leaf.
Look at me on my branch.
A terrible storm came and knocked me off.
The day you see me fall is not the day I die.
And when they need me, where are they going to find me?
The good Lord, and St. Nicola,
I only have one son
And they made him leave the country.

== Audio samples ==
Year	Band	Song Title	Album	Notes
1996	RAM	"Fèy"	Aïbobo	Censored by Haitian military, 1992-1994
