= Haitian rock =

Music genre

Haitian rock, or rock kreyòl, started as rock n roll in Haiti in the early 1960s. It was played by rock bands called yeye bands. The name yeye derives from the Beatles lyrical verse, "yeah, yeah, yeah", which took off in the United States and was listened to by upper class Haitian families who had access to the radio. Young Haitians formed small electric guitar-based bands. These yeye rock bands were short-lived, as the addition of compas to their repertoires resulted in a sound was called mini-jazz, or mini-djaz in Haitian Creole.

Today, Rock Kreyòl is an alternative rock music with a blend of Caribbean flavor that was first introduced to Haiti by Yohann Doré. Although there has been a rock influence in the modern Haitian genre mizik rasin, which fuses Vodou elements with traditional rock n roll, rock kreyòl maintains the rock form with subtle native elements from Haiti.

== See also ==
- Compas
- Mini-jazz
- Mizik rasin
