= Richard Auguste Morse =

Haitian-American musician

Richard Auguste Morse (born 1957) is a Puerto-Rican-born Haitian-American musician and owner of the Hotel Oloffson in Port-au-Prince, which burned down in 2025. He resides in Maine. Morse is the founder of a mizik rasin band, RAM, named after his initials. Morse is married to the band's lead female vocalist, Lunise Morse, and has two children. Morse and his band are famous in Haiti for their political songs and performances critical of the Raoul Cédras military junta from 1991 to 1994. In the early 2000s, Morse has also criticized Jean-Bertrand Aristide and Fanmi Lavalas through his music. Morse is a United States citizen. His cousin Michel Martelly is a musician, right-wing Haitian politician and former President of Haiti. Richard Morse repeatedly expressed support for Martelly in the 2010 presidential elections in Haiti. By the end of 2012, he had distanced himself from the Martelly government.

== Early life ==
Richard Auguste Morse was born in Puerto Rico in 1957. His father, Richard M. Morse, was an American academic sociologist and writer, and his mother, Emerante de Pradines (1918-2018), was a famous Haitian singer, as was his maternal grandfather, Auguste de Pradines. The family did not stay in Puerto Rico for long, and Richard grew up in the town of Woodbridge, Connecticut in the United States. Morse graduated from Princeton University in 1979 with a degree in anthropology. While at Princeton Morse sang with a band, "The Groceries," which became sufficiently successful to play-off-campus. They played new wave and punk rock music with certain Caribbean musical style elements.

== Move to Haiti ==
In 1985, Morse was dating a woman whose father strongly disapproved of his daughter dating a musician. Morse also had a falling out with his fellow band members in The Groceries over musical differences, and was struggling with the direction his life should take. A conversation with a French record producer persuaded Morse to start over and move to Port-au-Prince to better explore Haitian and Caribbean music. In 1987, he signed a 15-year lease to manage the Hotel Oloffson, then dilapidated and the inspiration for the fictional Hotel Trianon in Graham Greene's famous 1966 novel The Comedians. While restoring the hotel, Morse hired a local folkloric dance troupe and slowly converted it into a band. Morse fell in love with one of the performers, Lunise, whom he married.

RAM was formally created in 1990. Morse would become the songwriter and lead male vocalist, Lunise became the lead female vocalist, and the name of band, RAM, comes from Richard's initials. RAM was a rasin band. One of the most important musical movements that swept Haiti in the years following the exile of dictator Jean-Claude Duvalier, mizik rasin combines elements of traditional vodou ceremonial and folkloric music with rock and roll. The ancient drum rhythms of former African slaves combined with the beat of American rock and roll was a perfect combination for the musical background of Morse. The Hotel Oloffson was also a perfect venue for rehearsals and performances. When not on tour elsewhere in the country, RAM began playing a regular performance every Thursday night at the hotel.

The Hotel Olofsson was incinerated in July 2025 by Hatian gangs in an arson attack, the details of who and why are unknown. Morse left Haiti in 2022 due to the violence, and the hotel stopped taking guests in 2024. By 2025 the three skeleton staff of caretakers were forced to abandon the old hotel, a few months later arsonists burned it to the ground.

== Political protest through music ==
Jean-Bertrand Aristide, the first elected president of Haiti after the exile of dictator Jean-Claude Duvalier, was overthrown in a coup d'état in 1991. RAM and other rasin bands were strongly identified with Aristide and his political party, Lavalas. When other performers, such as Boukman Eksperyans and Manno Charlemagne, left the country in exile, Morse and his band chose to stay in Port-au-Prince. The music that Morse wrote and RAM performed was often laced with political messages critical of the military junta led by Raoul Cédras. Richard, Lunise, and other members of the band were threatened or harassed. In 1992, Morse adapted a traditional vodou folk song, "Fèy", to a rasin rhythm and instrumentation. Despite no overt references to the political situation, it was widely played on the radio and immediately taken up throughout the country as an unofficial anthem of support for Aristide. By the summer of 1992, playing or singing the song was banned under military authority, and Morse was subjected to death threats from the regime. In one particular instance, Morse was summoned before Evans François, the brother of Colonel Michel François, who told Morse that any number of assassins would be willing to kill him for as little as fifty cents in payment.

In September 1994, U.S. military troops arrived to oust the Cédras regime, and Morse and his band were finally able to release some of their music in their own albums. Over time, Morse, like many other Haitians, had become disillusioned with Aristide and his new political party, Fanmi Lavalas. In 1998, Manno Charlemagne, the newly elected Fanmi Lavalas mayor of Port-au-Prince, sent armed men to the Oloffson to dismantle the float on which RAM was scheduled to perform in the upcoming annual Carnival. The mayor had taken offense to the lyrics of one of the band's songs, which he interpreted as an accusation of corruption. In a compromise, the band was allowed to perform on a flatbed truck. However, the brakes on the truck were sabotaged [evidence?] and during the procession, the truck swerved into the crowd, killing eight and forcing the members of the band to flee for their lives.

== Vodou ==
Since moving to Haiti in 1985, Morse has been involved in the vodou community. The music he writes and performs is inspired by traditional vodou folk music, and incorporates the petwo drums and rara horns used in vodou ceremonies. Eventually, Richard Morse became so involved in the vodou religion through his music that he was initiated as a houngan, or vodou priest, in 2002. Describing a RAM concert, Morse explains, "Yes, you might see our dancers go into a trance. Some get possessed by the loas, to the rhythm of the drums, but it's a natural state when it happens. You can't fake it."
