= Rasin =

Haitian music genre

- Stylistic origins: Rada rhythms, petro rhythms, rock and roll, Hard rock
- Cultural origins: 1977, Haiti
- Typical instruments: Rada and petro drums, tanbou, rara horns, electronic keyboards, electronic drums, electric guitars, electric bass

Subgenres
- Rabòday

Regional scenes
- Haiti, French West Indies, Dominica, France, North America

Rasin, also known as Haitian roots music, is a Haitian musical style that began in the 1970s, when musicians began combining elements of traditional Haitian Vodou ceremonial and folkloric music with various musical styles. The late 20th century style of this music links to the roots of Vodou tradition, where it came to be known as mizik rasin later in Haitian Creole. Modern-day, the movement is often referred to simply as "rasin" or "racine" (in French).

== Characteristics ==
Rasin bands combine the Vodou ceremonial and folk music traditions with various musical styles. The Haitian Vodou musical tradition includes "cool" rada rhythms often associated with Africa and the "hot" petro rhythms that speak of a New World, and rasin bands incorporate both styles in their music, although rarely in the same song. On top of the basic horn and drum rhythms, melodies are layered that include structure from rock and roll and jazz. Rasin instrumentation can include a variety of drums (including distinct rada and petro styles), rara horns, electronic keyboards, electronic drums, electric guitars, an electric bass, one or more vocalists, and other percussionists.

Most rasin song lyrics are written in Creole and often incorporate traditional Vodou ceremonial lyrics or poetry. Songs can speak to traditional Vodou themes such as spying and betraying, feeling lost or estranged, the need for judgement and justice, or the urge to reconnect with an ancestral homeland. Some rasin songs are based on prayers directed to particular loa, or gods, while others may be ballads relating to Haitian mythology. Many songs contain multiple layers of meaning, and can be interpreted as social or political commentary. Songs often emphasize spiritual messages of tolerance, faith, justice, and universal love. The music is upbeat and rhythmic and, like Vodou ceremonial music, intended for dancing.

== History ==
Under the regimes of François Duvalier, and his son Jean-Claude Duvalier, the government appropriated for itself the authority of the Vodou religious traditions and made extensive use of religious leaders and traditions to assert its brutal authority and impose order. When Jean-Claude Duvalier fled the country, a widespread dechoukaj uprooted the most oppressive elements of the former regime and attempted to separate the Vodou religion from its entanglements with the government. Unable to do so beyond a limited extent under the Duvaliers, musicians adopted traditional Vodou folk music rhythms, lyrics, and instrumentation into a new sound that incorporated elements of rock and roll and jazz. The movement also attracted Haitian American artists and members of the Haitian diaspora who returned to the country following the downfall of the Duvaliers.

Rasin bands often write and perform songs that contained political messages, either implicitly or explicitly. Sanba yo wrote a song "Vaksine" as a part of a UN vaccination campaign. "Ke'm Pa Sote" by Boukman Eksperyans, whose song title translates to "I Am Not Afraid" in English, was the most popular song at the 1990 Carnival in Port-au-Prince and was widely understood to be a criticism of the corrupt military government of General Prosper Avril. First performed during the 1992 Carnival in Port-au-Prince, just months after the presidency of Jean-Bertrand Aristide was overthrown by a military coup d'etat, RAM began regularly playing a song entitled "Fèy", the Creole word for "leaf". The song lyrics were of folkloric Vodou origins. Despite no overt references to the political situation, it was widely played on the radio and immediately taken up throughout the country as an unofficial anthem of support for Aristide. By the summer of 1992, playing or singing the song was banned under military authority, and band founder Richard Morse was subjected to death threats from the regime.

== Rasin musicians ==
A

- Ayibobo
- Azor

B

- Beken
- Belo
- Bob Bovano
- Boukan Ginen
- Boukman Eksperyans
- Buvu Ambroise
- Bwa Kayiman

C

- Carole Demesmin
- Chandel

D

- Djakata

E

- Eddy Francois
- Emeline Michel
- Eritaj
- Erol Josue

G

- Gwoup Sa (early rasin)

J

- Jacques Schwarz-Bart
- James Germain
- John Steve Brunache

K

- Kalfou Lakay
- Kanpech
- King Wawa
- Koudjay

L

- Lakou Mizik
- Lina Mathon Blanchet
- Lumane Casimir

M

- Malou Beauvoir
- Manno Charlemagne
- Martha Jean-Claude
- Melanie J-B Charles
- Moonlight Benjamin

N

- Naïka
- Netty

P

- Papa Bonga

R

- Racine Figuier
- RAM
- Rasin Kanga
- Riva Nyri Precil

S

- Sanba yo (early rasin)
- Sanba Zao (Louis Lesly Marcelin)
- Simbi
- So Anne

T

- Tokay
- Toto Bissainthe

W

- Wawa
- Weena
- Wesli

Z

- Zekle
- Zing Experience
- Zobop

== Audio samples ==
Year	Band	Song Title	Album	Notes
1996	RAM	"Fèy"	Aïbobo	Censored by Haitian military, 1992–1994
1997	RAM	"Zanj"	Puritan Vodou	Rara horn and petro drum instrumentation

== See also ==
- Haitian hip hop
- Haitian Vodou
- Haitian Vodou drumming
- Rock and roll
