= Münir Nurettin Beken =

Turkish academic

Münir Nurettin Beken (born 12 April 1964) is associate professor of ethnomusicology at the UCLA Herb Alpert School of Music. He is one of the founding members of the State Turkish Music Ensemble and the leading ud performer of his generation in Turkey. He performs ud recitals in a variety of venues throughout the U.S. and Turkey, and lectures on classical Turkish music.

== Life ==
Born in Istanbul, Münir Nurettin Beken was named after the famous Turkish singer and composer Münir Nurettin Selçuk. He joined the State Conservatory of Istanbul at the age of 11, and studied oud with Mutlu Torun. After graduating in 1986, he spent three years conducting the Conservatory Orchestra and also recorded many television programs for TRT, the Turkish state radio and television network. Beken earned his master's degree from the State Conservatory of Turkish Classical Music in 1988. The following year he enrolled at UMBC to study for a Ph.D. in ethnomusicology, which was awarded in 1998.
