= Olive Beken =

New Zealand landscape painter

- Born: Olive Harriet Meek; 1897
- Died: December 4, 1982 (aged 84–85)
- Known for: landscape paintings
- Spouse: Arthur Charles Beken
- Children: 2

Olive Beken (née Meek) was a New Zealand landscape painter based in Canterbury.

== Biography ==
Olive Harriet Meek was born in 1897. On 10 November 1920, Meek married Albert C. Beken. They had a son and a daughter.

Beken painted landscapes in oil and watercolour. Beken exhibited widely, notably at the Auckland Society of Arts, the Canterbury Society of Arts (1921-1980), the New Zealand Academy of Fine Arts (1927-1968), and the Otago Art Society. She also exhibited at the Nelson Suter Art Society in 1960. She competed in the Hays Art Competition in 1963.

In her first exhibition with the Canterbury Society of Arts, she exhibited five artworks, including The Farmhouse and Homeward, and generally exhibited at least one landscape painting from 1921 to 1980. She was described as a "well known Christchurch painter" in a report of the 1964 Canterbury Society of Arts annual exhibition. Several of her artworks sold during her lifetime, including Long Point Beach and At Woodend from the Otago Art Society Annual exhibition in 1946, and one from the 1947 Canterbury Society of Arts annual exhibition. In 1966, a Dallas based oil operator, Mr F. W. Burford bought one of her paintings, Mt Arthur from Rae Road, for 25 guineas.

Beken died on 4 December 1982.
