= Richard E. Morse =

American physician, politician, and diplomat

Member of the Michigan House of Representatives from the Washtenaw County district
- In office November 2, 1835 – January 1, 1837

United States Commercial Agent in Curaçao
- In office 1861–1863
- Preceded by: Moses Jerusun
- Succeeded by: Promoted to consul

United States Consul to Curaçao
- In office 1863–1864
- Preceded by: Promoted from commercial agent
- Succeeded by: James Faxon

Personal details
- Born: 1809 Otsego County, New York
- Died: April 22, 1864 (aged 54–55) Curaçao
- Party: Democratic (before 1861); Republican (from 1861)

Richard E. Morse (1809 – April 22, 1864) was an American medical doctor, politician, and diplomat. He served one term in the Michigan House of Representatives and was later appointed as the United States consul to Curaçao. He was briefly married to the successful detective novelist Metta Victoria Fuller Victor.

== Biography ==
Richard Morse was born in Otsego County, New York, in 1809. He moved to Ypsilanti, Michigan, in 1833, and began practicing as a medical doctor. He served as a surgeon with the Michigan militia during the Toledo War, a mostly-bloodless dispute with Ohio over a strip of land along their border that delayed Michigan's statehood until it was resolved in 1836.

In the first elections under the new state constitution in 1835, he was elected as a Democrat to the Michigan House of Representatives and served for one term. Afterwards, he was the postmaster of Ypsilanti from 1837 to 1841. He served as the secretary of the state's Democratic Central Committee.

Morse changed his political allegiance from the Democrats to the Republicans in 1861. By then he had moved to Iowa. Upon receiving word in August 1861 that the CSS Sumter had been allowed to conduct repairs on the island of Curaçao, Secretary of State William H. Seward removed the U.S. consul there, Moses Jesurun, and appointed Morse in his place. From 1861 to 1863 he served as the U.S. commercial agent in Curaçao, and from 1863 to 1864 as consul. He was buried in Curaçao following his death there on April 22, 1864.

=== Family and personal life ===
On November 19, 1850, Morse married writer Metta Victoria Fuller. She was over 20 years his junior, and they divorced within a few years; she remarried in 1856, went on to have a successful career writing detective novels, and is credited with pioneering the form of the dime novel.
