= Dechoukaj =

Dechoukaj is a Haitian Creole term that literally means "uprooting". It is used primarily to refer to the political upheaval in Haiti following the exile of dictator Jean-Claude Duvalier on February 7, 1986. During the dechoukaj many ordinary Haitian peasants and city dwellers exacted revenge on their oppressors, including members of the Tonton Macoutes. The dechoukaj especially affected the institution of the Haitian Vodou religion, whose principals and traditions had been strongly and directly tied to the dictators and used to exert control over the population.

== See also ==
- History of Haiti
