= Richard McGee Morse =

Latin Americanist scholar (1922–2001)

Richard McGee Morse, Ph.D. (June 26, 1922 – April 17, 2001) was an American Latin Americanist scholar and professor at Columbia University, University of Puerto Rico, Yale University and Stanford University before finishing his career at the Wilson Center in Washington, D.C.

Morse was born in Summit, New Jersey, United States, but moved with his family at a young age to Greenwich, Connecticut. After graduating from the Hotchkiss School, Morse enrolled at Princeton University in 1939, where he studied literature with Allen Tate and R. P. Blackmur. As a student, Morse studied in Cuba, Mexico, Chile, Argentina, and Brazil, and graduated magna cum laude in 1943 with a major in the School of Public and International Affairs.

Following World War II, Morse continued his studies at Columbia University, earning an M.A. (1947) and Ph.D. (1952). Morse was chairman of Latin American Studies at Yale University before moving to Stanford University in the late 1970s. In 1984 he moved to Washington, D.C., with his wife Emerante, when he became Secretary of Latin American Affairs at the Woodrow Wilson Center, a "think tank" associated with the Smithsonian Institution. Morse was one of the first academics in the United States to offer a nontraditional analysis of Latin America by suggesting, often to the dismay of contemporaries in other fields, that English-speaking North America had much to learn from the cultures of Castilian-, Portuguese- and French-speaking countries of the South.

His most influential work was perhaps Prospero's Mirror, published in Spanish in 1982 and in Portuguese in 1988, but never entirely in English. In that book, Morse passionately defends that cultural and social originality of Latin America, particularly that of Brazil and Mexico, could be the source of new ideas, thoughts and solutions for the world. In 1993, Morse was awarded the Order of the Southern Cross (Ordem do Cruzeiro do Sul) for contributions to Brazilian culture, the nation's highest honor for non-Brazilians.

He married Emerante de Pradine, a Haitian singer, in 1954 and had two children, Richard Auguste Morse and Marise Morse Mahos.

Morse died due to Alzheimer's disease on April 17, 2001, at his home in Pétion-Ville, Haiti.
