= Tanbou =

Type of barrel drum

A tanbou (Haitian Creole pronunciation: [tãbu]) is the national musical instrument and type of barrel drum from Haiti. The drum is used in many music genres of Haiti and has been influential in the rest of the Caribbean and Latin American world.

== Origins ==
The lineage of this Haitian drum is complex, originating in West African Vodun systems. A Tanbou needs to be carefully crafted in order to get the best sound. The drum is no longer used in Nigeria, but the banda rhythm that has been kept alive by Haitian drummers, such as "Bonga" (Gaston Jean-Baptiste). "Tanbou" is derived from the French word tambour, which means drum.

== Description ==
A tanbou produces an organic, versatile sound that can be used for dance, professional recording, and supposedly healing and merry making. The drum has survived centuries and some of the oldest are from old temples in Haiti. The older the drum, the better the sound according to the drummers.

The tanbou is made with a stick like a vessel; a hardwood – tronpèt, bwachen, gomye – and covered with a piece of animal skin or a material capable of awe as the skins in a corner are made goat or cow. These drums can be used like regular congas. It is very difficult to get drums from Haiti into the United States because crafting them is equally challenging due to finding the right wood and particularly the skins which must be procured under the exact conditions.
