= Georges Corvington =

Georges Corvington, Jr. (6 November 1926 - 3 April 2013) was a Haitian historian. He is best known for his seven-volume work on the history of Haiti's capital city, Port-au-Prince, entitled Port-au-Prince au Cours des Ans (Port-au-Prince Over The Years) (1743-1950). The book was published from 1970 to 1992.
