= Manno Charlemagne =

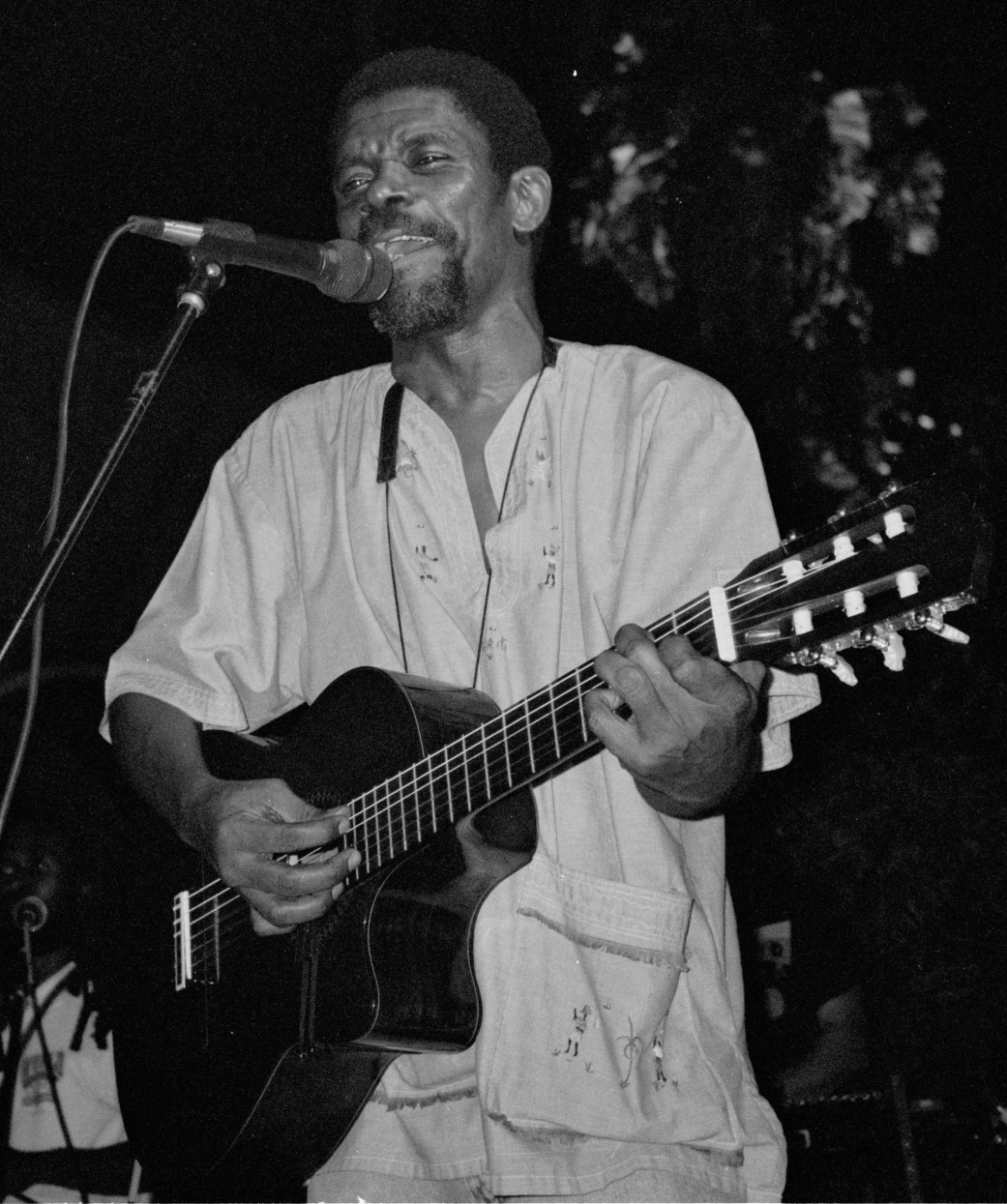
- Manno Charlemagne
- Born: Joseph Emmanuel Charlemagne; April 14, 1948; Port-au-Prince, Haiti
- Died: December 10, 2017 (aged 69); Miami Beach, Florida, U.S.
- Occupations: Singer, songwriter, acoustic guitarist, activist, politician

Joseph Emmanuel "Manno" Charlemagne (April 14, 1948 – December 10, 2017) was a Haitian political folk singer, songwriter and acoustic guitarist, political activist and politician. He recorded his political chansons in both French and in Creole. He lived abroad in exile twice, both during the 1980s and again during the years 1991–1994, when the country was ruled by a military junta led by Raoul Cédras.

== Early life ==
Charlemagne grew up in Carrefour, to the south of the capital of Port-au-Prince, where he was influenced as much by the songs of the peasants who moved into the area in search of a livelihood, as by his Catholic school choir. Raised by his aunt, he did not know who his father was until he was 37 years old.

== Political career ==
In 1986, after the fall of the Duvalier dictatorship, Charlemagne organized a youth group and choir in his old neighborhood, Carrefour. For a brief time following Jean-Bertrand Aristide's landslide victory on 16 December 1990, Charlemagne found himself in the role of a government booster. He served as an unofficial minister in the Aristide cabinet, an assignment that ended abruptly nine months later, when a military junta overthrew Haiti's first freely elected president.

On 11 October, a truckload of troops pulled up to his home, roughed him up in front of his family, and hauled him off to jail. His wife, Chantel, went into hiding with the couple's baby son, Ti-Manno, and later fled to the island of Guadeloupe.

Charlemagne was elected mayor of Port-au-Prince in June 1995. He remained in office until 1999.

== Music ==
Charlemagne took up guitar and singing at the age of 16. By 1968, he had formed a band named Les Remarquables. He later started a twoubadou band named Les Trouvères with Marco Jeanty.

== Death ==
Charlemagne died in Miami Beach, Florida on December 10, 2017, aged 69, after a struggle of several months with lung cancer which had metastasized to his brain.

== Discography ==
- 1978, Manno et Marco, Marc Records
- 1984, Konviksyon
- 1988, Òganizasyon mondyal
- 1988, Fini les colonies
- 1993, La Fimen

== Sources ==
- Averill, Gage (1997). A Day for the Hunter, a Day for the Prey: Popular Music and Power in Haiti. Chicago: University of Chicago Press. pp. 126–27. ISBN 0-226-03292-2.
- Gates, Henry Louis; Appiah, Anthony (1999). Africana: The Encyclopedia of the African and African American Experience. New York: Basic Civitas Books. p. 411. ISBN 0-465-00071-1.
