= The Comedians (novel) =

1965 novel by Graham Greene

- First edition cover
- Author: Graham Greene
- Language: English
- Publisher: Bodley Head
- Publication date: 28 January 1965 (USA); 1966 (UK)
- Publication place: United Kingdom
- Media type: Print (hardback and paperback)
- OCLC: 365953
- Preceded by: A Burnt-Out Case
- Followed by: Travels with My Aunt

The Comedians (1965) is a novel by Graham Greene. It is set in Haiti during the regime of François "Papa Doc" Duvalier and his secret police, the Tonton Macoute. The novel explores political repression and terrorism through the figure of an English hotel owner, Brown.

It was released first in the United States on 28 January 1965, and in 1966 in the United Kingdom.

The story begins as three men, Brown, Smith, and Jones, meet on a ship bound for Haiti. The three men are the "comedians" of Greene's title. Complications include Brown's friendship with a rebel leader, hotel guests who are politically active, and an affair with Martha Pineda, the wife of a South American ambassador. The fictional Hotel Trianon, the setting for much of the novel, was inspired by the Hotel Oloffson in central Port-au-Prince.

The novel was adapted as a feature film of the same name, released in 1967 and starring Richard Burton, Elizabeth Taylor, Alec Guinness, Peter Ustinov, James Earl Jones, Cicely Tyson, Paul Ford and Lillian Gish.

== Plot summary ==
The main characters travel to Haiti on the Medea, a Dutch ship serving the capital Port-au-Prince and the Dominican Republic. The narrator is Mr. Brown, returning from an unsuccessful trip to the United States to sell his hotel, which is located in the capital. Other figures are Mr. Smith, a US presidential candidate who ran on the vegetarian ticket in the 1948 United States presidential election; he and Mrs. Smith plan to build and operate a vegetarian centre in Haiti. "Major" Jones, an Anglo-Indian businessman, is personable and has many war stories that are not quite believable.

Brown returns to his hotel, where he finds that government minister Philipot has committed suicide in his pool. He had apparently become a target of the government. Brown has to dispose of the body to avoid being implicated. Meanwhile, Jones is arrested as soon as he sets foot on Haitian soil. Brown convinces Mr. Smith to use his 'political weight' to help Jones get out of prison. Jones makes connections in the Haitian government.

The body of Secretary Philipot is found and his family tries to hold a funeral. The president's death squad, the Tontons Macoutes, ambush the procession and steal the body. Philipot's nephew decides to join the rebel forces. First he is required to take part in a traditional voodoo initiation ceremony.

Brown reunites with his lover, Martha Pineda, wife of the Uruguayan ambassador. She is unwilling to leave her husband and child. Realizing they can't pursue their dream in Haiti, Mr. and Mrs. Smith leave for the nearby Dominican Republic.

Jones has been declared an enemy of the state, and Brown tries to get him out of the country. Believing Jones threatens his relationship with Martha, Brown persuades him to join the rebels in the north. Jones' lack of military sense is soon revealed and he is killed in action, while the rebellion fails. Duvalier consolidates his power and Brown, unable to return to his hotel, goes to Santo Domingo. There he works as a mortician.

== Characters ==
- Mr. Brown, the protagonist and narrator. Owns a hotel in Haiti.
- Major Jones, arrives on the Medea with Brown and the Smiths.
- Mr. and Mrs. Smith, arrive on the Medea; hope to establish a vegetarian centre in Haiti.
- Martha Pineda, Brown's lover and the wife of the Uruguayan ambassador.

== Critical reception ==
The New York Times noted that Greene writes about dark places, and this novel explores Haiti under Duvalier and his paramilitary, known as the Tontons Macoutes. Greene explores "despair at evil triumphant, sustained by dollar-aid from the U.S.A." He expresses "despair at the death of the good Communist doctor and the would-be-good confidence trickster, Major Jones." The reviewer recognised Greene's studies of persons who were failures, as "grey" was uppermost in his literary world. He notes,

"Nevertheless he [Jones] is the novel's hero. He can die- he can succeed in that- and he dies heroically, covering the retreat of the rest, since his flat feet would only delay the whole party if he were to try to escape with his men."

He also says that Greene writes with "much liveliness and skill, and with such a will and ability to please and carry us along" that we want to visit his lands.

In The New York Review of Books, Sybille Bedford described this tenth novel by Greene as "a work of strength and freshness, and in its core there lies the steel coil of compulsion." She describes the novel as a "very good story, as we have come to expect." In describing the characters, she notes that Brown goes to Haiti as "the only place on earth where he might be said to have a stake, a love affair, and a piece of property."

== Duvalier's reaction ==
In his Ways of Escape, Greene wrote that the book "touched him [Duvalier] on the raw." Duvalier attacked The Comedians in the press. His Ministry of Foreign Affairs issued a brochure entitled, "Graham Greene Demasqué" (Finally Exposed). It described Greene as "A liar, a cretin, a stool-pigeon... unbalanced, sadistic, perverted... a perfect ignoramus... lying to his heart's content... the shame of proud and noble England... a spy... a drug addict... a torturer." ("The last epithet has always a little puzzled me," Greene confessed.)

== Adaptations ==
The novel was filmed in 1967 as The Comedians, with the screenplay by Graham Greene. It was directed and produced by Peter Glenville, and starred Richard Burton, Elizabeth Taylor, Alec Guinness, and Peter Ustinov.
