= Haitian Vodou drumming =

Music genre related to Haitian Vodou religion and culture

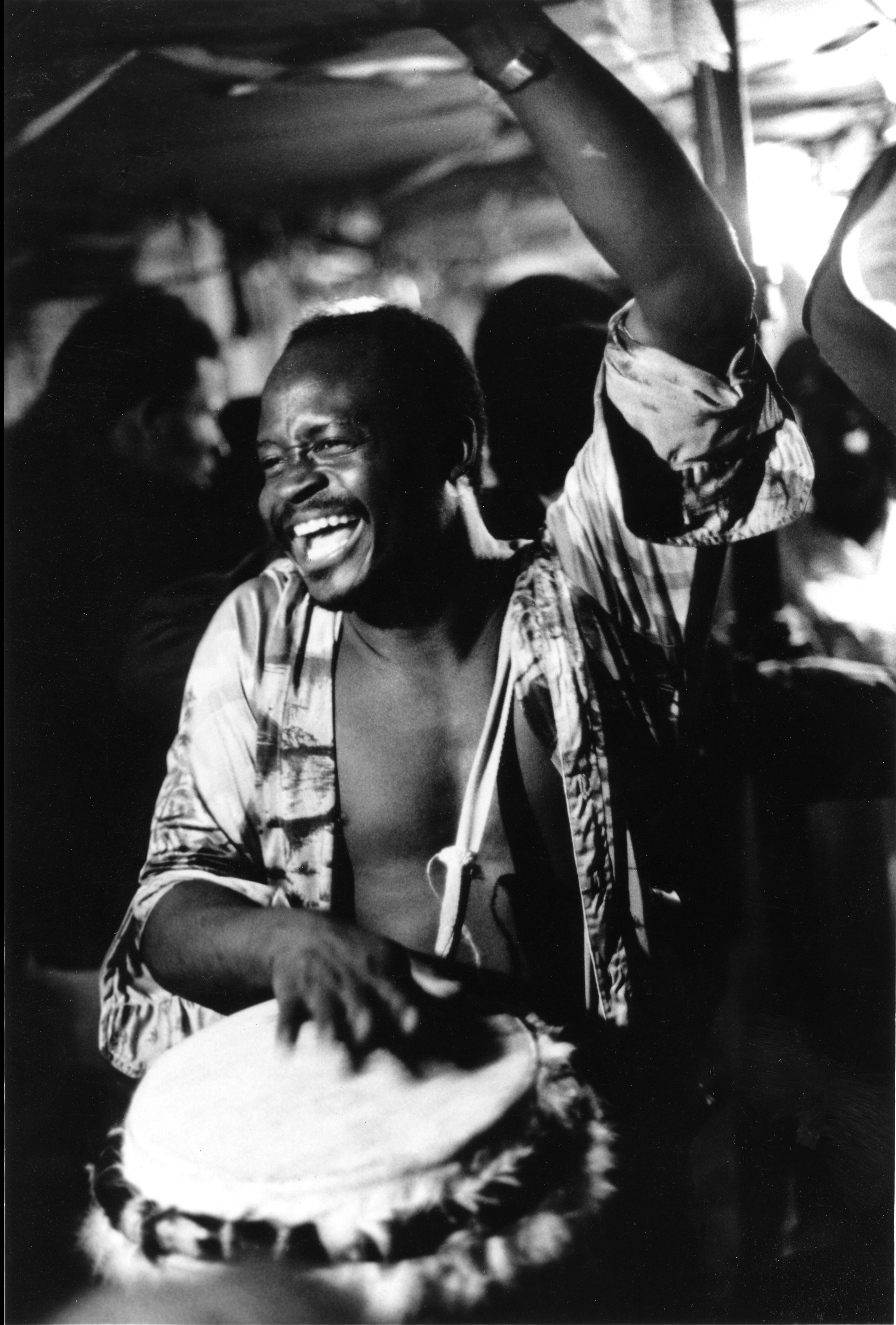
Frisner Augustin drums for a Vodou dance in Brooklyn, early 1980s

Vodou drumming and associated ceremonies are folk ritual faith system of henotheistic religion of Haitian Vodou originated and inextricable part of Haitian culture. Drummers are called houn'tôrguiers. Vodou drumming is widely practiced in urban centres in Haiti and some cities in North America (especially New Orleans). The ritualistic faith system that involves ceremonies that consist of singing, drumming and dancing.

The Vodou drumming rituals call upon abstract ancestral spirits, called Loas (or Lwas), for their aid, instruction, special powers and strengths as embodiment of certain principles or characteristics. While certain aspects of this religion may share the same roots, it is completely contrary to the stereotype of black magic, witch doctors, pins in dolls, and zombies portrayed by New Orleans style Voodoo (a variation of the name).

== Religious and cultural history and context ==
Through the involuntary mass dispersion of slavery, the traditional West African Vodun religions went through the process of Religious syncretism between Roman Catholicism. Due to mass dispersion of the West African population from its indigenous territories, the colonial plantation system created and influenced the Haitian Vodou's ecotheological perspective. The relationship of Vodou's belief system lies heavily on ecological systems. The interest in ecotheological ethics are the base of beliefs in Vodou religion, these ethics are ancestor worship, nature spirits, and natural processes such as birth, death, weather, and fertility. With the globalization of Yoruba religions through African diaspora, many Eurocentric religions denounce Yoruba religions and practices. This is because of the negative misconception where it is believed that religions like Haitian Vodou, have a devotion to witchcraft, sorcery, and demon worship. The demonization of Yoruba religions can be contributed to the blatant racism caused by colonization. In April 2003 Haitian president Jean-Bertrand Aristide officially recognized Vodou as a religion in Haiti. Due to the negative stigma that surrounds the Haitian Vodou, The Haitian government has had a history of previously persecuting those who practiced the religion. Vodou in Haiti was often used as a scapegoat for the country’s issues. This misunderstanding and negative stigma can be noted back to the nation's founding. The dispute over the validity of the religion, was both beyond and within Haiti.

== Drumming in Ritual ==
In Vodou ritual, drummers are called tambouriers, and becoming one requires a lengthy apprenticeship. The drumming style, choice of rhythm, and composition of the orchestra differs depending on which nation of lwa are being invoked. The drum rhythms typically generate a kase ("break"), which the master drummer will initiate to oppose the main rhythm being played by the rest of the drummers. This is seen as having a destabilizing effect on the dancers and helping to facilitate their possession.

The drumming is typically accompanied by singing, usually in Haitian Creole. These songs are often structured around a call and response, with a soloist singing a line and the chorus responding with either the same line or an abbreviated version. The soloist is the hungenikon, who maintains the rhythm with a rattle. Lyrically simple and repetitive, these songs are invocations to summon a lwa. As well as drumming, dancing plays a major role in ritual, with the drumming providing the rhythm for the dance. The dances are simple, lacking complex choreography, and usually involve the dancers moving counterclockwise around the poto mitan. Specific dance movements can indicate the lwa or their nation being summoned; dances for Agwé for instance imitate swimming motions. Vodouists believe that the lwa renew themselves through the vitality of the dancers.

== See also ==
- Music of Haiti
- Arará — Cuba's Rada variation.
