= Personal anthem =

Ceremonial music for a particular office

The 191st Army Band performs three Ruffles and Flourishes which is followed by the "General's March" as honors are rendered to General Robert W. Cone at Fort Hood.

The anthem for a person, office or rank is music played on formal or ceremonial occasions in the presence of the person, office-holder, or rank-holder, especially by a military band. The head of state in many countries is honored with a prescribed piece of music; in some countries the national anthem serves this purpose, while others have a separate royal, presidential, or, historically, imperial anthem. Other officials may also have anthems, such as the vice-regal salute in several Commonwealth realms for the Governor-General, Governor, or Lieutenant Governor. Ruffles and flourishes may be played instead of, or preceding, such an anthem.

== Examples ==
Countries where the national anthem is also the head of state's personal anthem include Barbados, Jamaica, Japan, Malaysia, and the Netherlands.

Other examples include the following:

Country	Office/rank	Music	Notes
Argentina	President	"Marcha de Ituzaingó"	Presidential March
Australia	Monarch	"God Save the King"	
Australia	Governor-General, Governors	Vice-regal salute	The first and last four bars of "Advance Australia Fair", the national anthem. Before 1984, the royal salute was the first six bars of God Save the King.
Brazil	President	"Continências ao Presidente da República"	Introduction and final chords of the Brazilian National Anthem. Only applicable at military ceremonies.
Canada	Monarch, consort	"God Save the King"	
Canada	Other Royal Family members	The first six bars of "God Save the King"	
Canada	Governor General, Lieutenant Governors	"Salute to the Governor General/Lieutenant Governor", commonly called the Vice Regal Salute	The first six bars of "God Save the King" immediately followed by the first four and last four bars of "O Canada", the national anthem. For a pipe band, a combination of "Mallorca" and "O Canada" is played instead.
Czech Republic	President	"Fanfáry z Libuše"	Fanfares from overture of the opera Libuše.
Denmark	Monarch	"Kong Christian stod ved højen mast"	Also one of two national anthems, the other being "Der er et yndigt land".
Ecuador	President	"Honores al Presidente de la Republica" (Presidential Salute) "Marcha Presidential" (Presidential March)	1. In the Army, Air Force and Police, a bugle fanfare followed by the chorus of "Salve, Oh Patria"; 2. In the Navy, four long blasts of the boatswain's call then the rest as above 3. Played at the arrival of the president in military events, once the arrival honors have been received.
Estonia	President	"Pidulik marss" ("Solemn March", or Presidential March)	In 1922, "Pidulik marss" won the contest for Estonian-composed state march. On 27 January 1923, it was adopted by the then-Minister of War Jaan Soots as the honorary march of the State Elder of Estonia (later known as the president of the Republic of Estonia), thus replacing the "Porilaste marss" which was previously used in its place.
Estonia	Commander of the Estonian Defence Forces and Commander-in-Chief of the Estonian Defence Forces	"Porilaste marss" was the honorary march of the State Elder of Estonia until 27 January 1923 when it was replaced by the "Pidulik marss".	"March of the Pori Regiment"/"March of the Björneborgers". The tune was first publicly performed in Estonia at the 7th Estonian Song Festival in 1910, a handful of years before the declaration of independence.
France	President	"Chant du départ"	Adopted by then-president Valéry Giscard d'Estaing in 1974 as the personal anthem of the president of France.
Haiti	President	"Quand nos Aïeux brisèrent leurs entraves" (Chant Nationale)	"When Our Fathers Broke Their Chains" (also known as the National Hymn). Poem by Oswald Durand, set to music by Occide Jeanty in 1893 to serve as a national anthem; replaced by "La Dessalinienne" in 1904.
Ireland	President	"Presidential Salute"	The first four and last five bars of "Amhrán na bhFiann", the national anthem.
Ireland	Taoiseach	"Mór Chluana" / "Amhrán Dóchais"	"Mór Chluana" ("More of Cloyne") is a traditional air collected by Patrick Weston Joyce in 1873. "Amhrán Dóchais" ("Song of Hope") is a poem written by Osborn Bergin in 1913 and set to the air. John A. Costello chose the air as his salute. Though the salute is often called "Amhrán Dóchais", Brian Ó Cuív argues "Mór Chluana" is the correct title.
Italy	President	"S'hymnu sardu nationale" ("Inno Sardo Nazionale")	First adopted in 1991.
Korea (Republic of)	President	"Phoenix Hymn"	Modified version of Star March, played during military parades or events attended by the President.
Malaysia	Raja Permaisuri Agong; Yang di-Pertua Negeri	Abridged version of the National Anthem	Consisting of first and last sections. Played before the relevant state's anthem if the salute is for the Yang di-Pertua Negeri.
Malaysia	State monarchs	Short version of "Negaraku" (the national anthem)	Consisting of last section. Played after the relevant state's anthem. Only may be played if the state monarch is present representing the King.
Malaysia	Crown Prince of Perlis	Dirgahayu Tuanku Raja Muda (Long Life to the Crown Prince)	Played as vice-regal salute in ceremonies presided by the Crown Prince of Perlis in his state.
Netherlands	Members of the Royal House; Governor of Aruba; Governor of Curaçao and Governor of Sint Maarten	"Het Wilhelmus"	The national anthem.
Netherlands	Various officials not entitled to "Het Wilhelmus" (Note: Cabinet members of the constituent countries of the Netherlands; senior Dutch military officers; Secretaries General of NATO, of the UN, and of the EU Council; EU foreign and security High Representative. (In the absence of persons entitled to the anthem))	"De Jonge Prins van Friesland"	Ministers used the national anthem until Queen Beatrix objected in 1986.
New Zealand	Monarch	"God Save the King"	Also one of two national anthems, the other being "God Defend New Zealand".
New Zealand	Governor-General	"Salute to the Governor-General"	The first six bars of "God Save the King". The anthem may also be played in full.
Norway	Monarch	"Kongesangen"	
Papua New Guinea	Monarch	"God Save the King"	
Philippines	President	"We Say Mabuhay"	The word mabuhay means "long live". The song, with music by Tirso Cruz, Sr and English lyrics by American James King Steele, was written c. 1935–40. Played to announce the arrival of the President during major events, minus the four ruffles and flourishes.
Poland	President	"Sygnał prezydencki"	Played in the presence of the President when the Presidential Ensign is raised in major events.
Romania	President	"Marș triumfal"	Played in the presence of the president in state events and during state visits by foreign high officials.
Singapore	President	"Majulah Singapura"	For the purposes of singing, the anthem is played in full. A version without the repeat of section B is used for a Salute to the President. An abridged version is used for Singapore Armed Forces Dining In and after the playing of the visiting dignitary’s National Anthem during a Welcome Ceremony at the Istana.
Thailand	Monarch	"Sansoen Phra Barami"	"The song of glorifying His Majesty's prestige". Former national anthem, still played before shows in cinemas and theatres and during all major events when the King and Queen are present.
Thailand	Monarch	"Sadudee Jom Racha"	"Hymn to the Righteous King". Used for ceremonies related to King Vajiralongkorn and Queen Suthida.
Thailand	Other members of the royal family	"Maha Chai"	"Grand Victory". Also used for regents and military officers who held the rank of Field Marshal, Admiral of the Fleet and/or Marshal of the Royal Thai Air Force.
Thailand	Other situations	"Maha Roek"	"Grand Auspice". Mainly used for the arrival of senior government officials and for inaugurations. It is also used as the General Salute Music of the Royal Thai Armed Forces.
United States	President	"Hail to the Chief"	
United States	Vice President	"Hail Columbia"	First 8 and last 4 bars
United States	Various officials (Note: State governors, chief justice, Speaker of the United States House of Representatives, President pro tempore of the United States Senate, chairmen of committees of Congress, Cabinet members, Department of Defense officials ranked assistant secretary or higher, senior diplomats, brigadier generals)	"Honors March 1"	32-bar medley of "Stars and Stripes Forever"
United States	Army, Air Force, and Space Force general officers	"General's March"	Also listed in AR 600-25 as "Honors March 2"
United States	Navy flag officers	"Admiral's March"	Also listed in AR 600-25 as "Honors March 3"
United States	Navy and Coast Guard admirals and Marine Corps generals	"Flag Officer's March"	Also listed in AR 600-25 as "Honors March 4"

== See also ==
- Fanfare
