= National symbols of Haiti =

This is a gallery list of official National symbols of Haiti

Flag:
The Bicolor

Coat of Arms:
The Palmiste

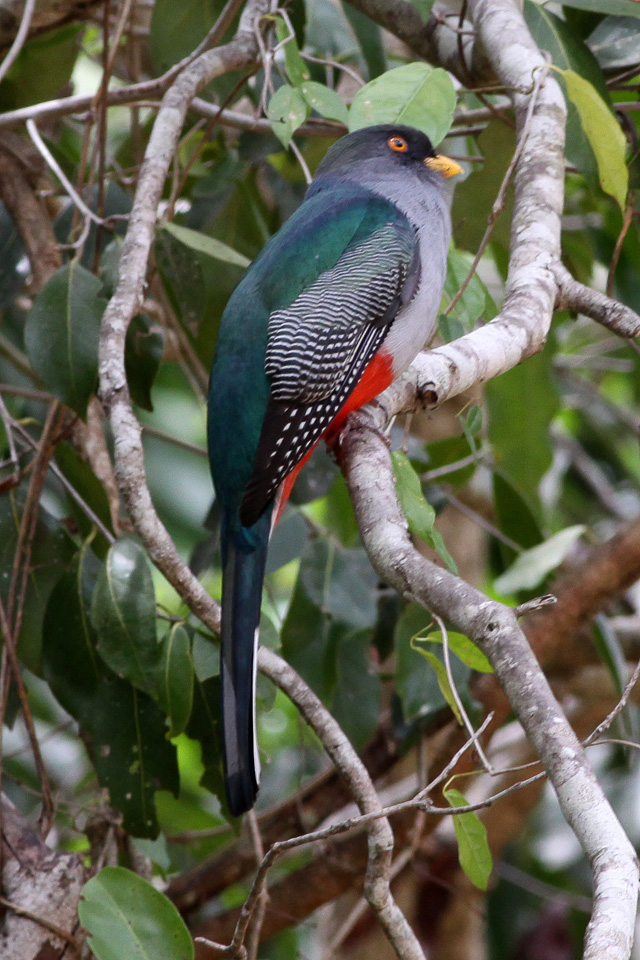
National Bird: Hispaniolan trogon

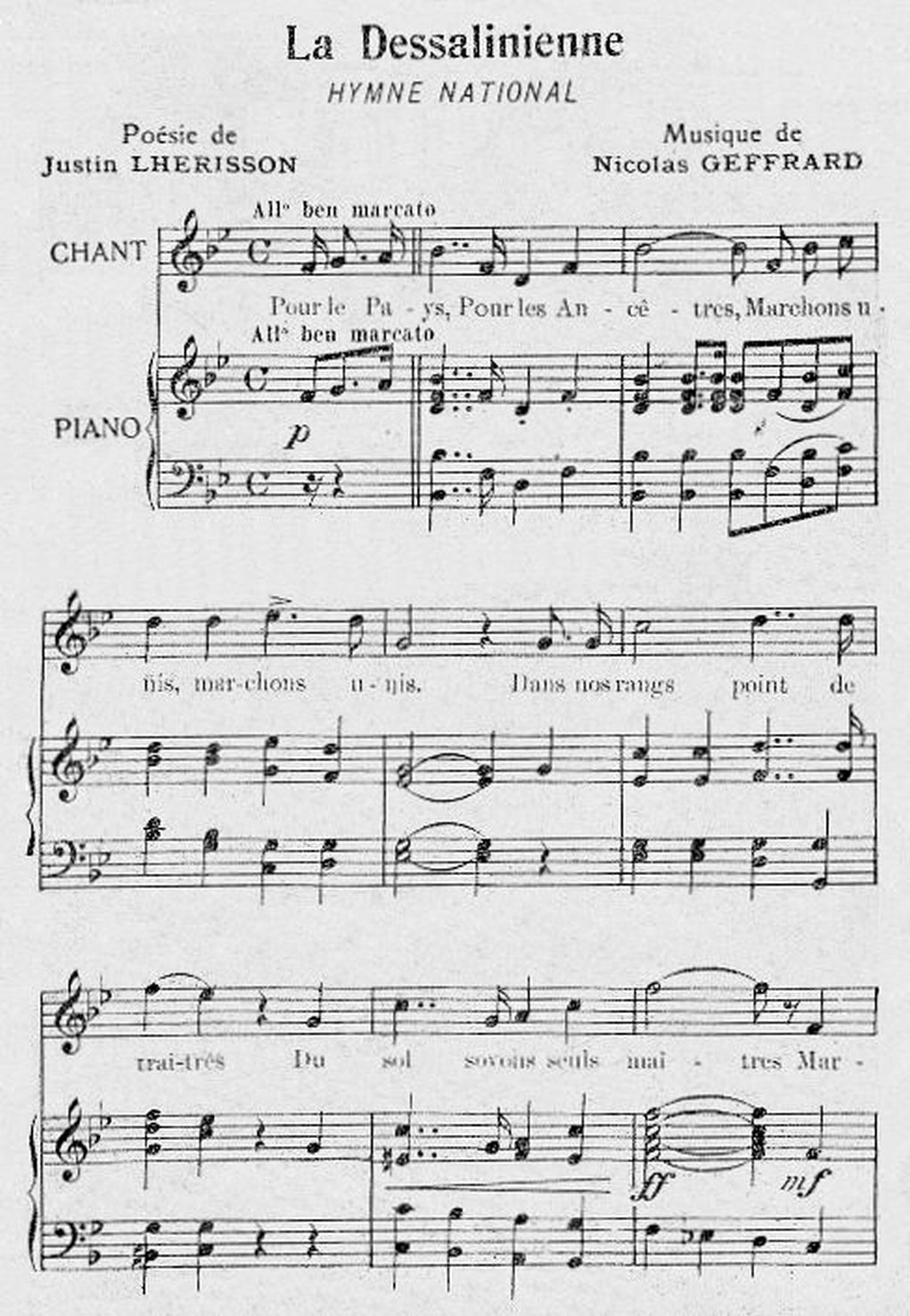
National Anthem:
La Dessalinienne

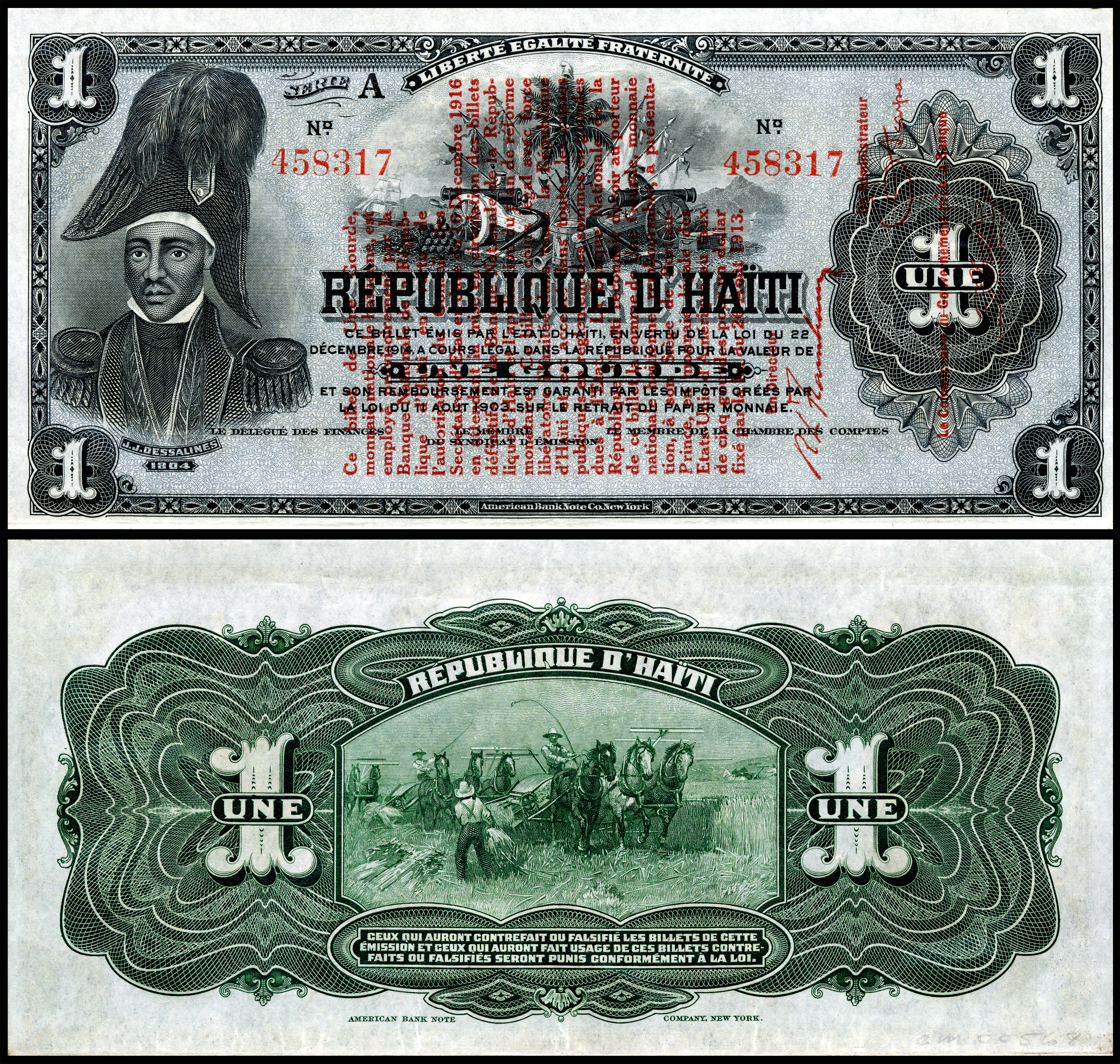
Haitian National Currency

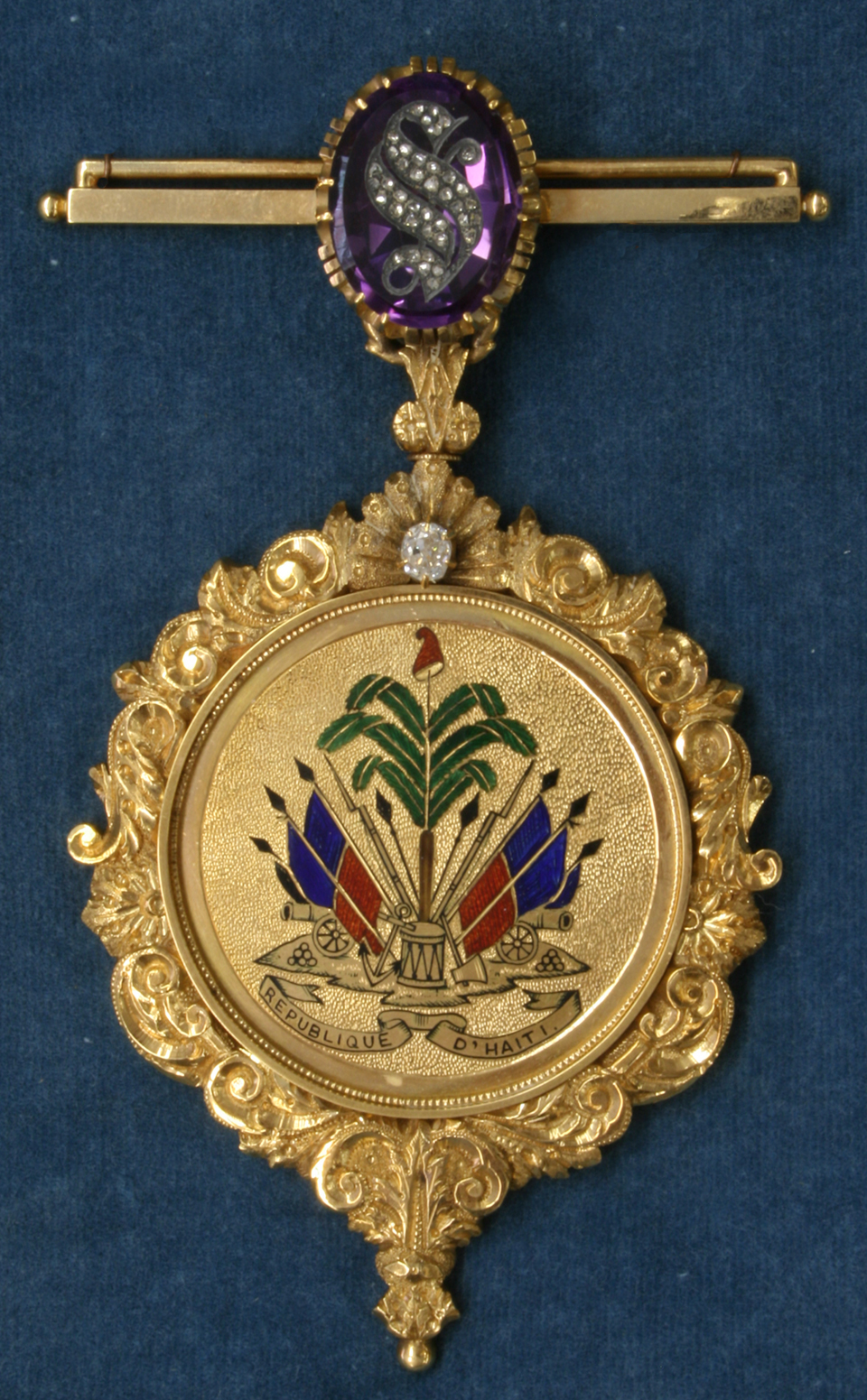
National Poem:
Quand nos Aïeux brisèrent leurs entraves ('When Our Fathers Broke Their Chains)

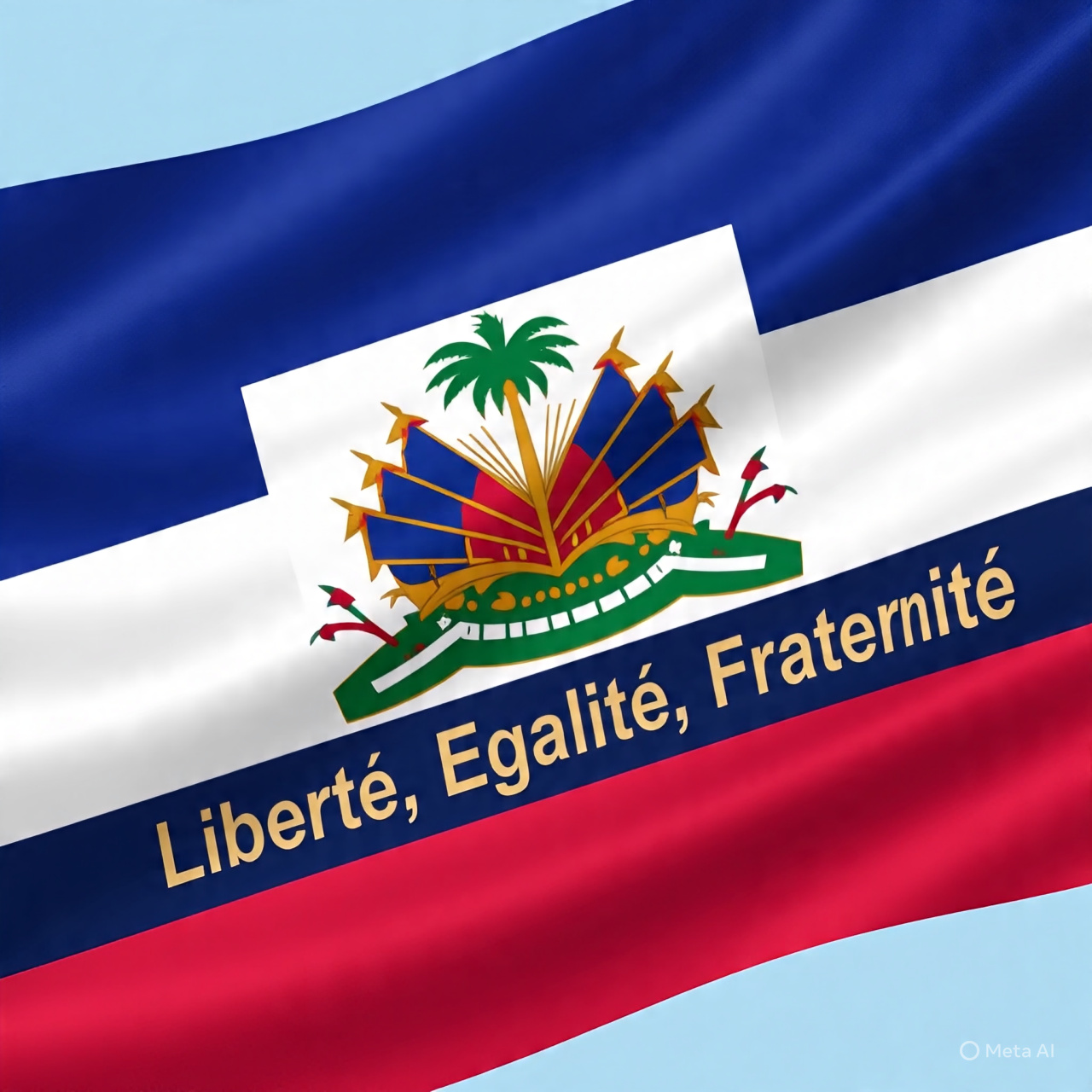
Official Motto:
Liberté, Égalité, Fraternité", "L'union fait la force"

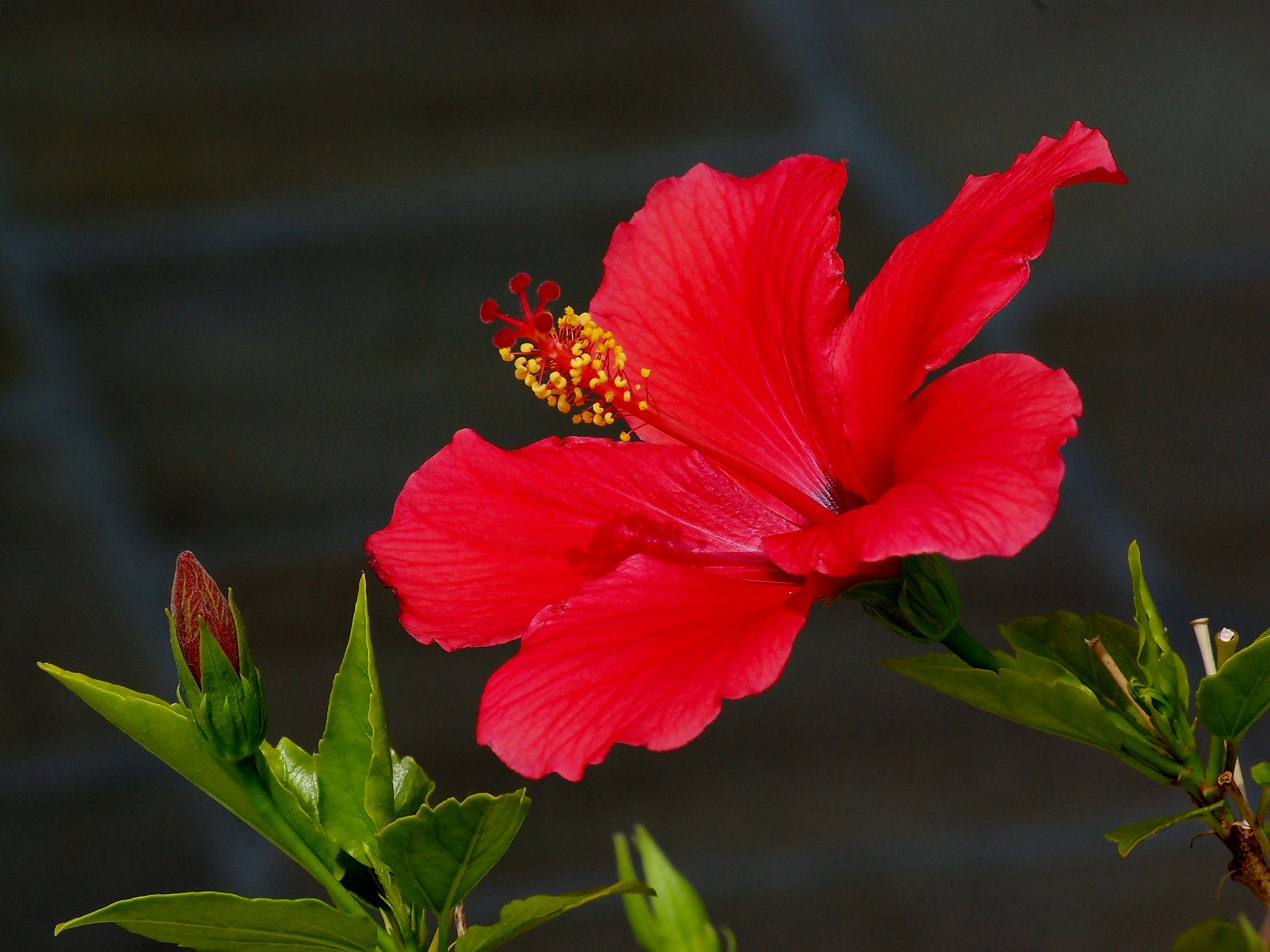
National Floral Emblem:
Hibiscus

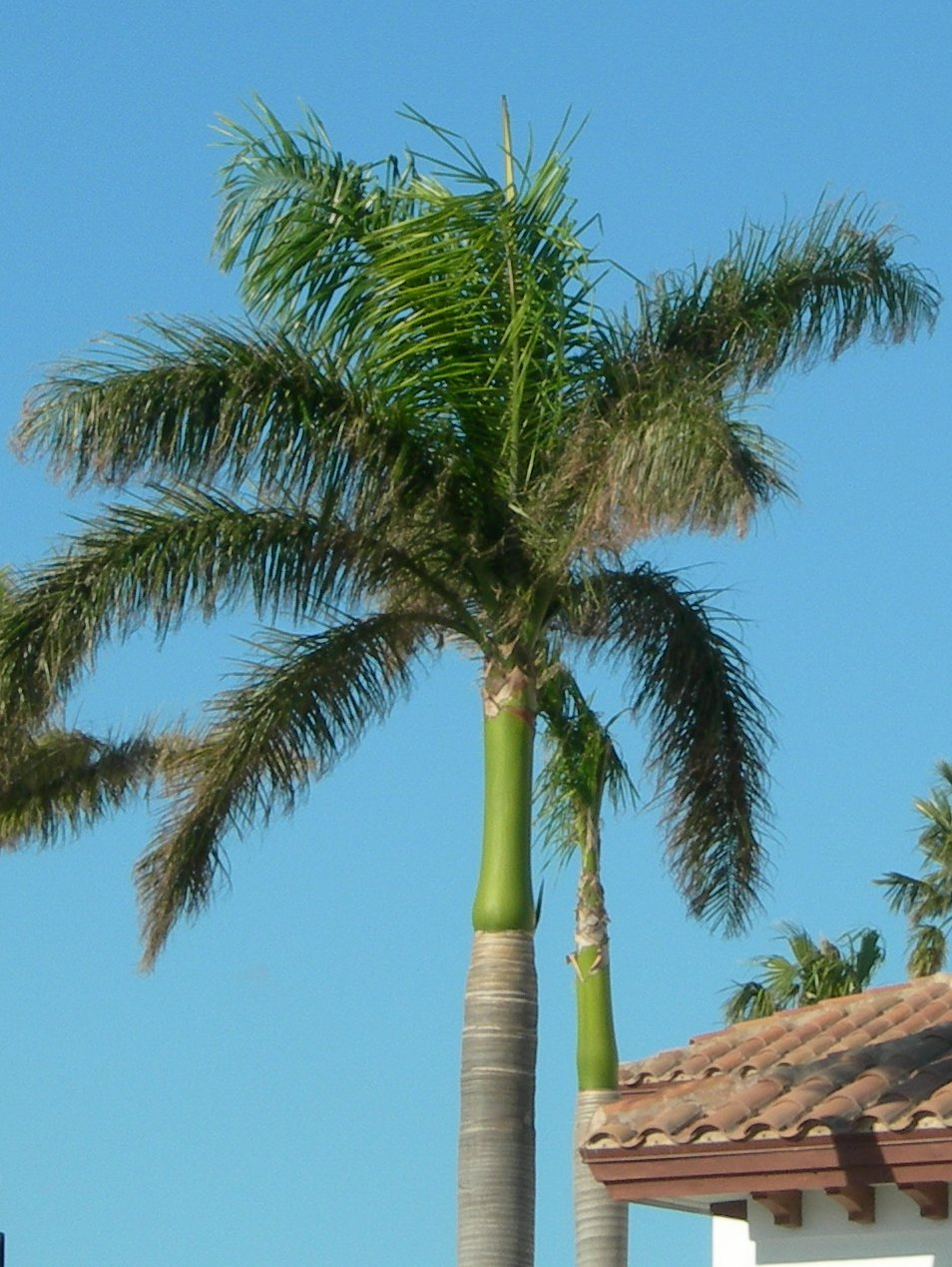
National Tree:
Royal Palm

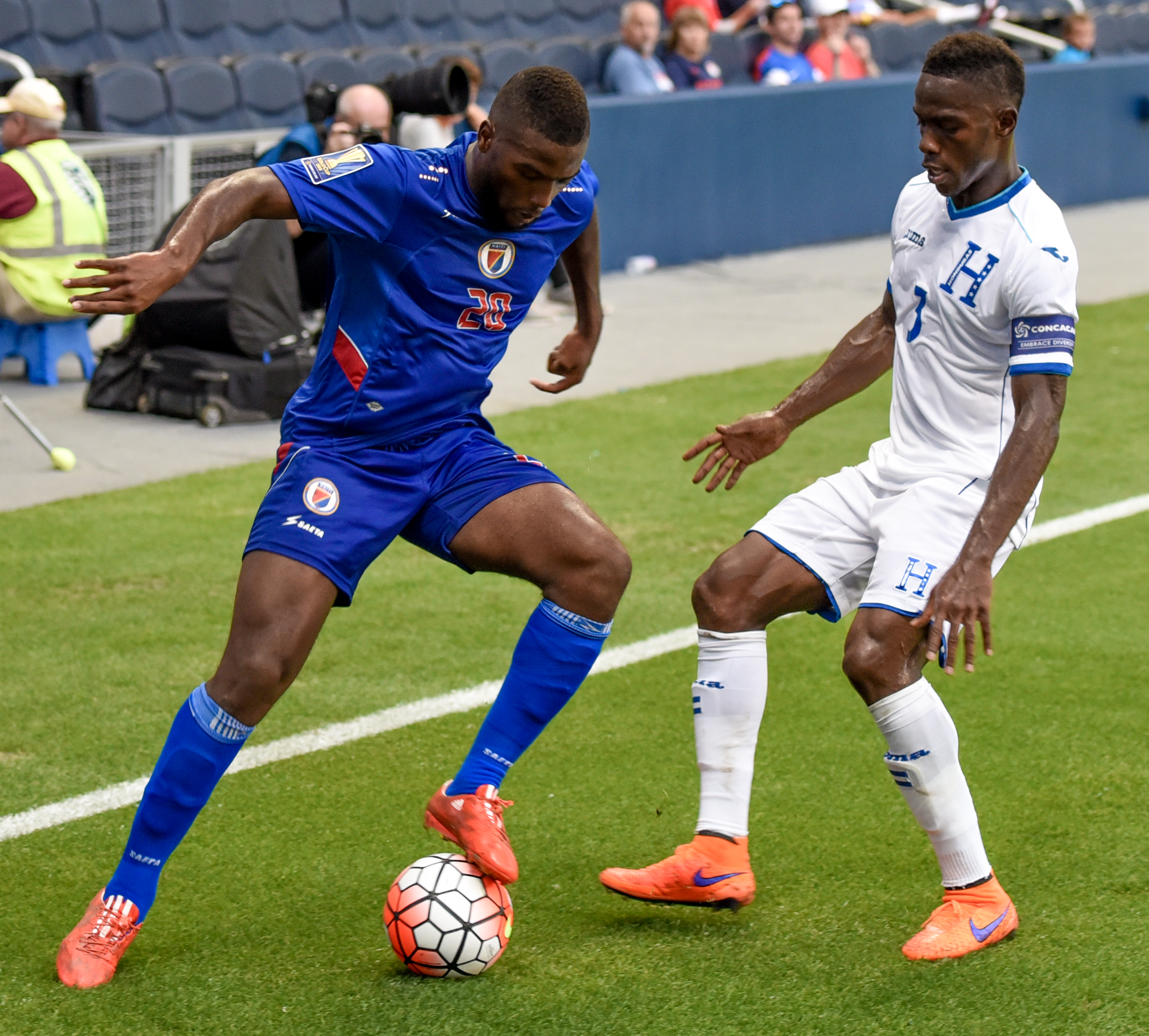
National Sport:
Soccer

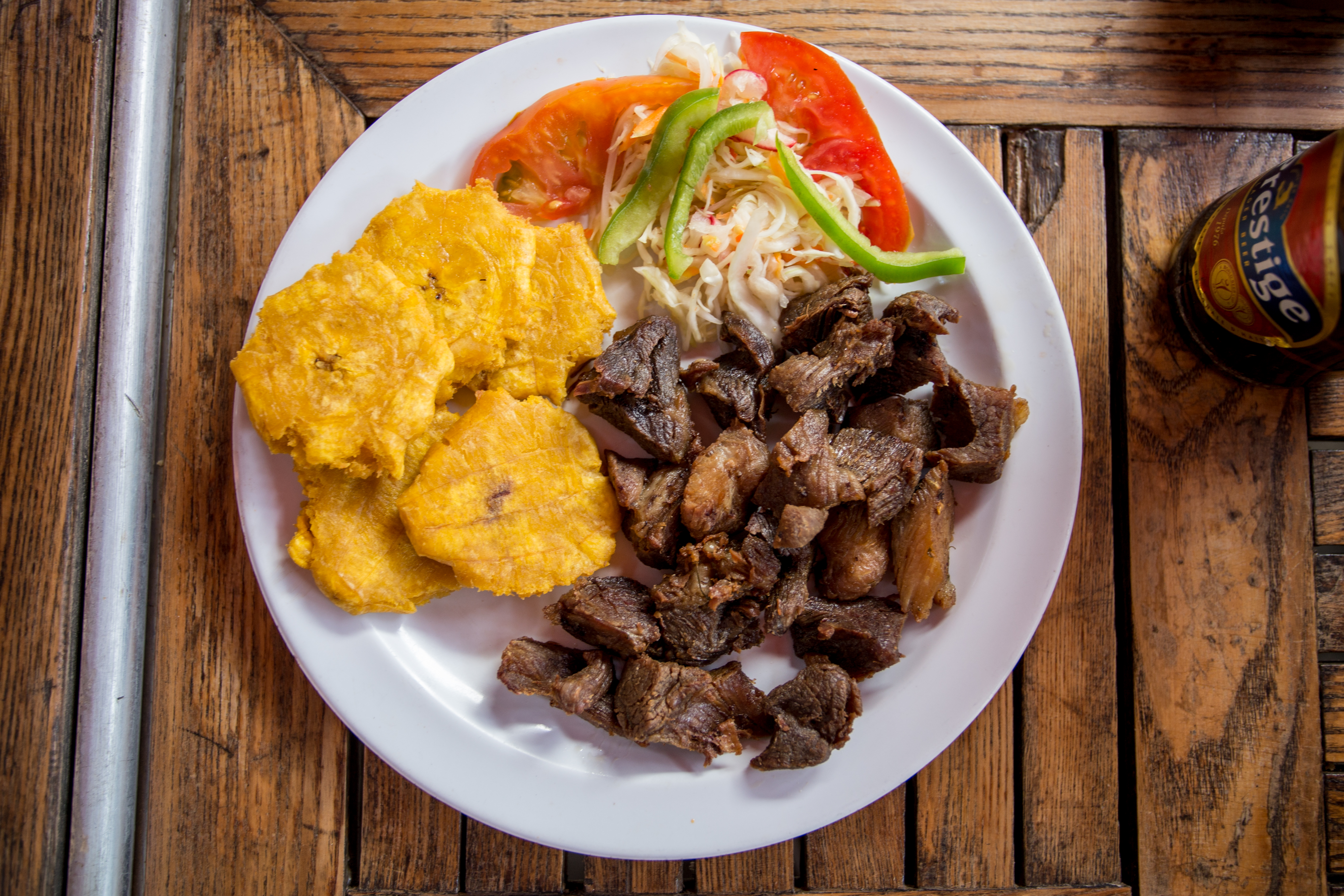
National Dish:
Diri ak jon jon, Griot, Banan peze

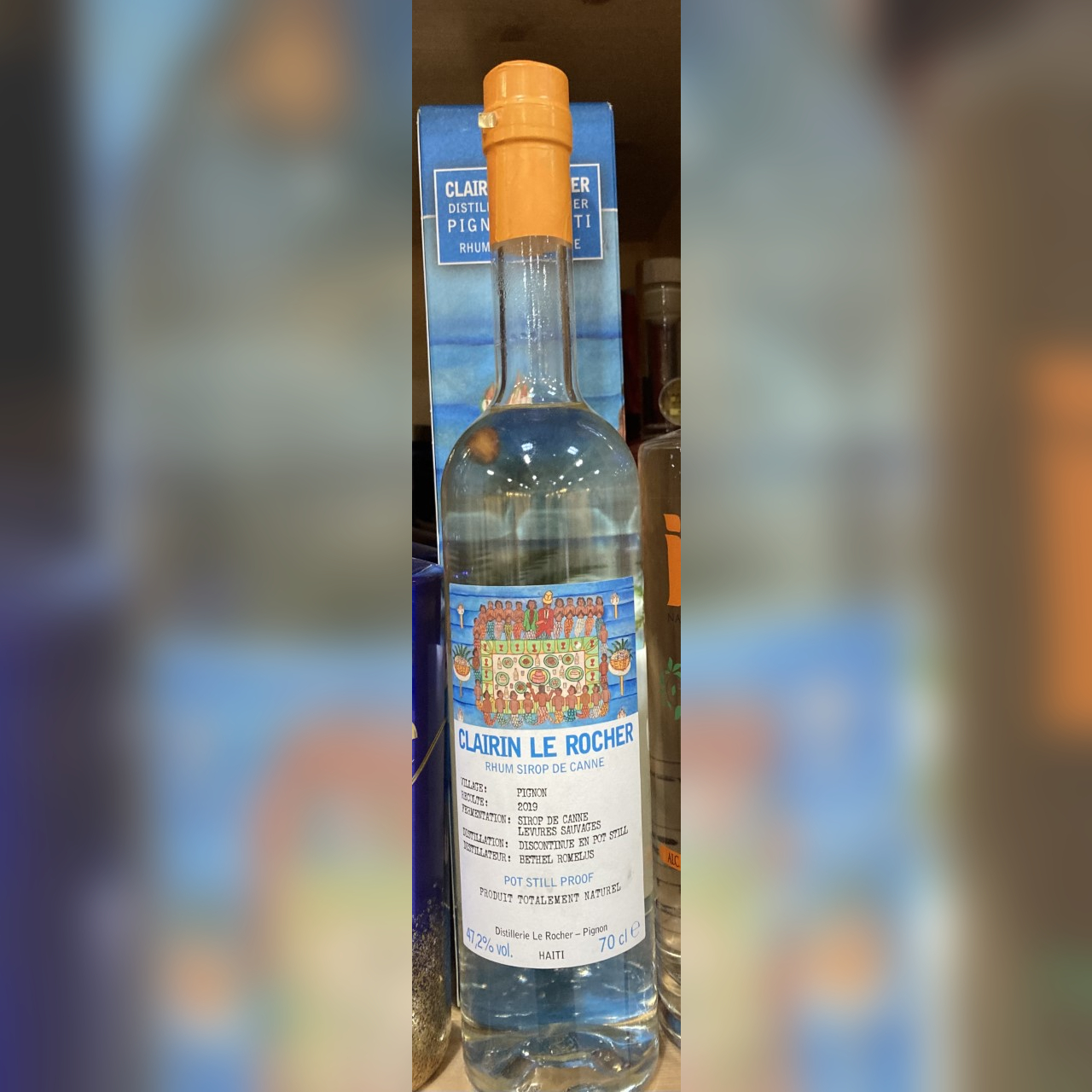
National Beverage:
Rhum, Kleren

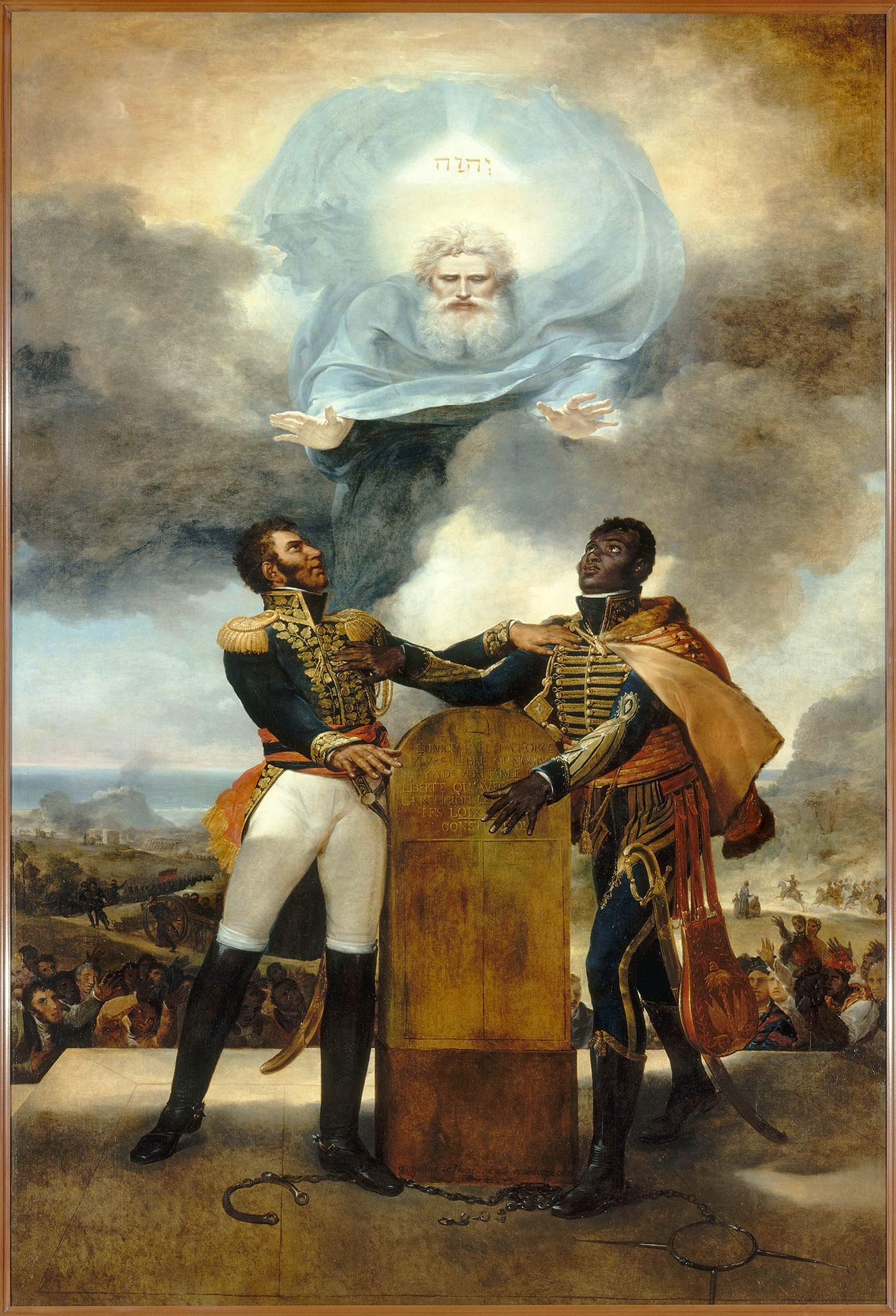
Founding Fathers:
Toussaint L'Ouverture, Jean-Jacques Dessalines,
Henri Christophe, Alexandre Pétion

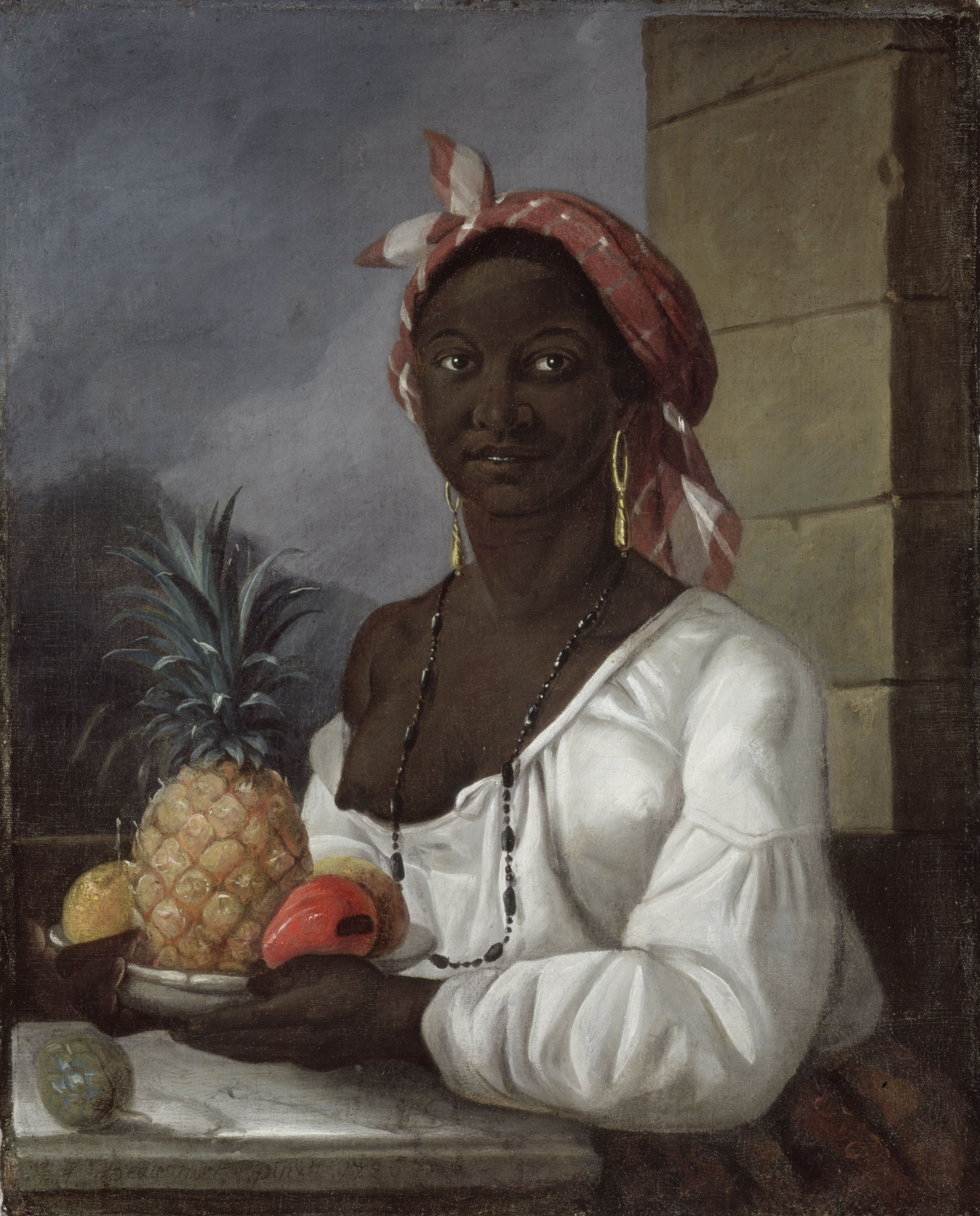
Founding Mothers: Victoria "Toya" Montou
Katrin (Catherine Flon), Cécile Fatiman and Dédée Bazile

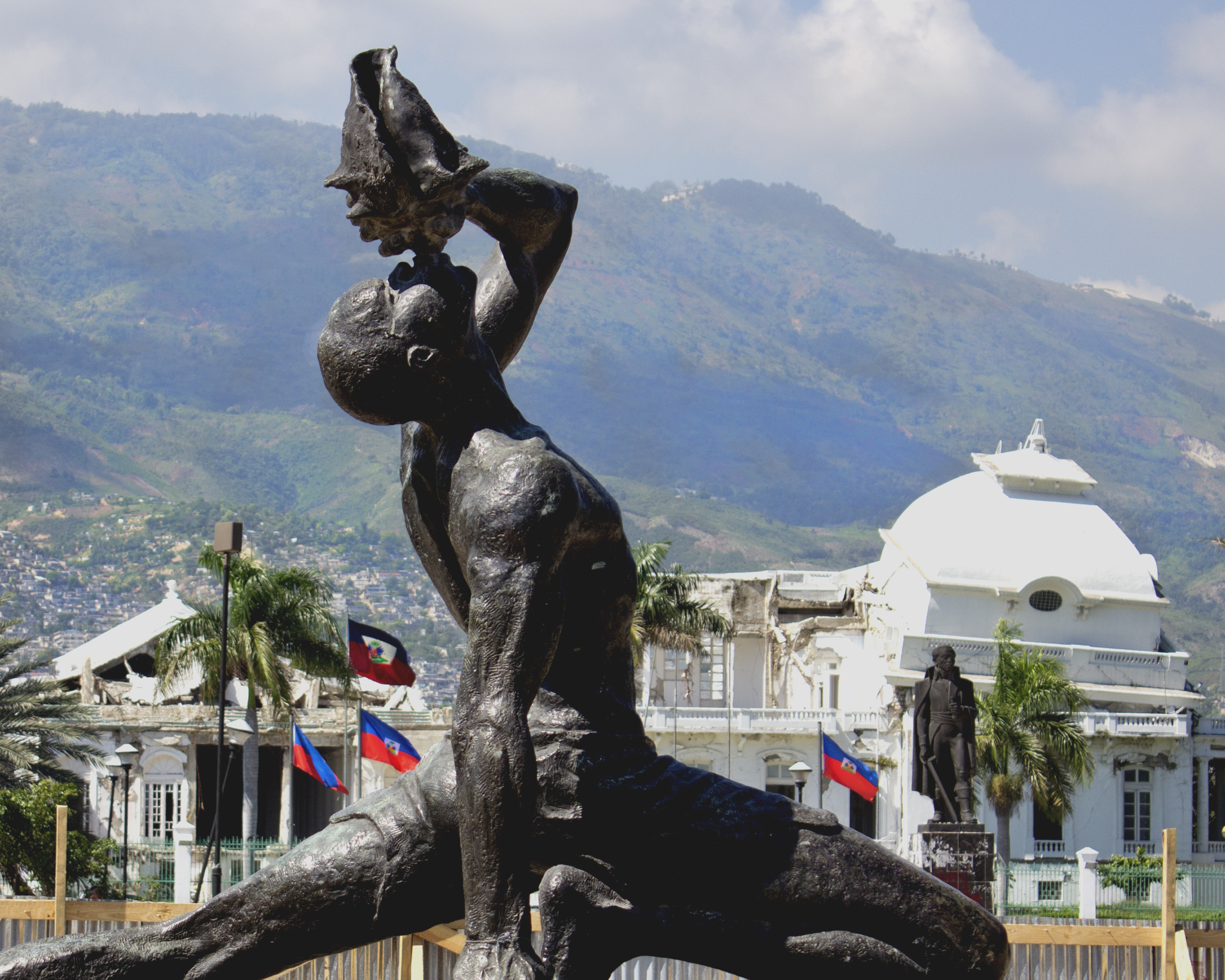
National Statue:
Le Marron Inconnu

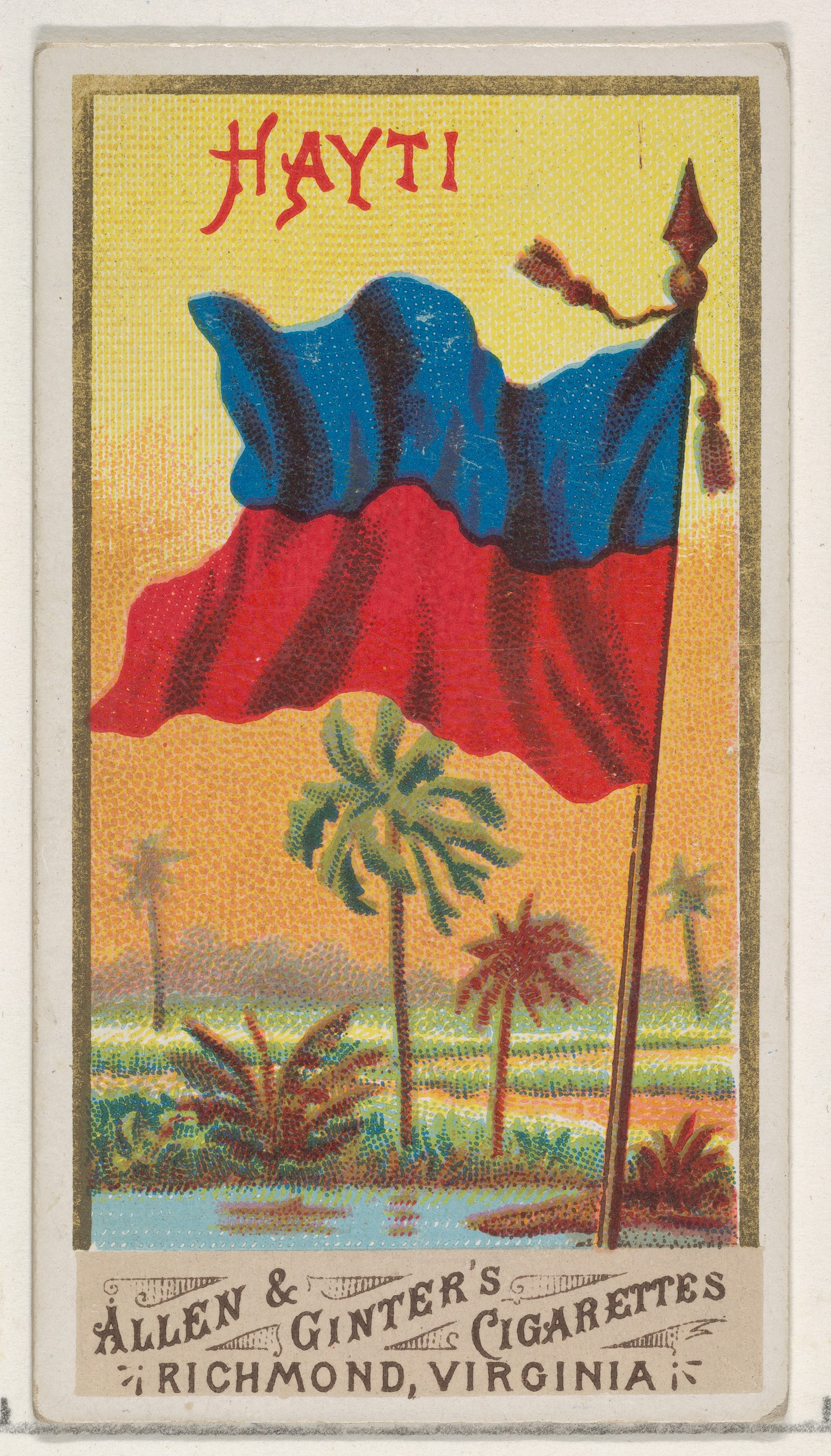
National Song:
Haïti Chérie

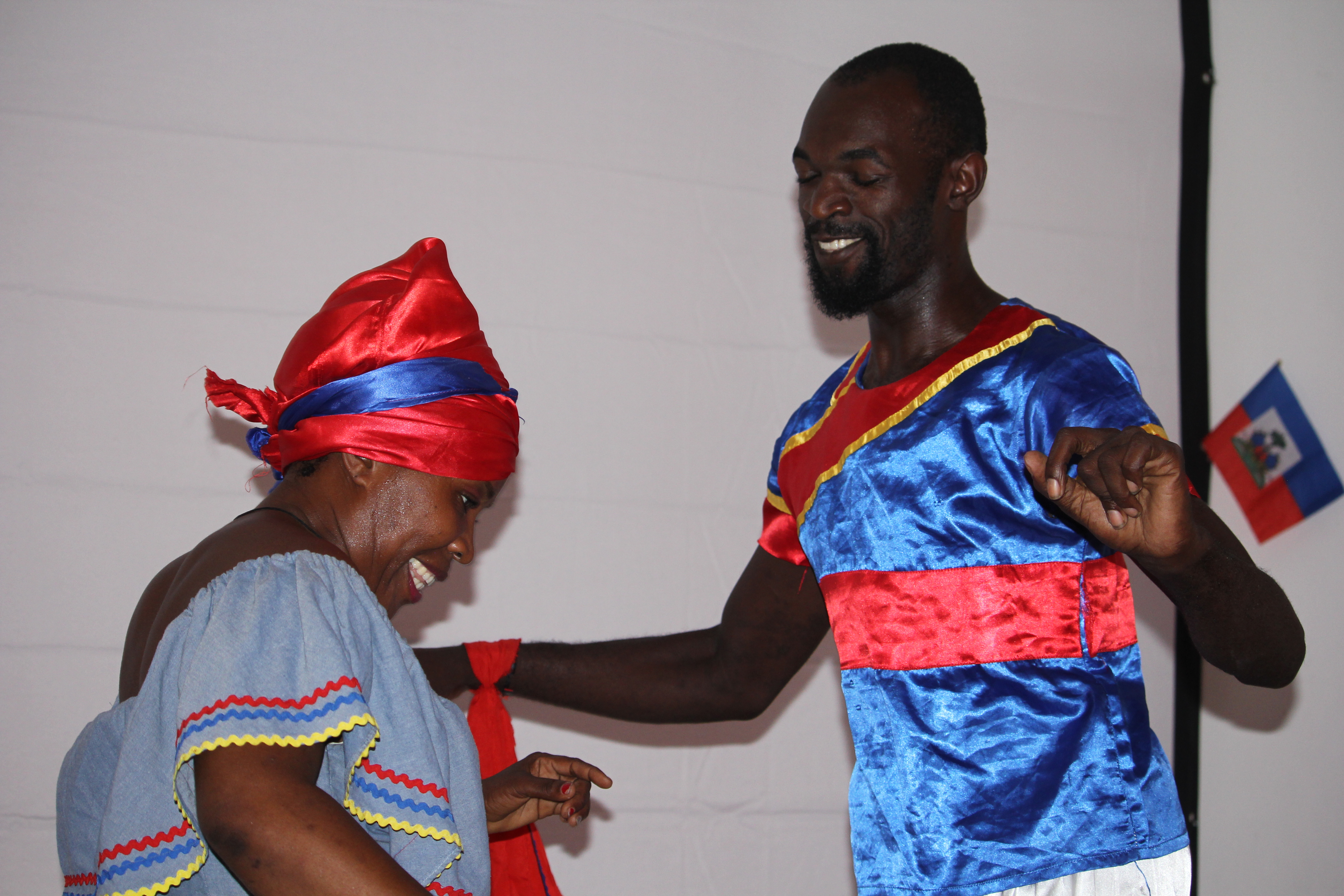
National Dance:
Mereng, Konpa, Twoubadou, Kontradans, Rara

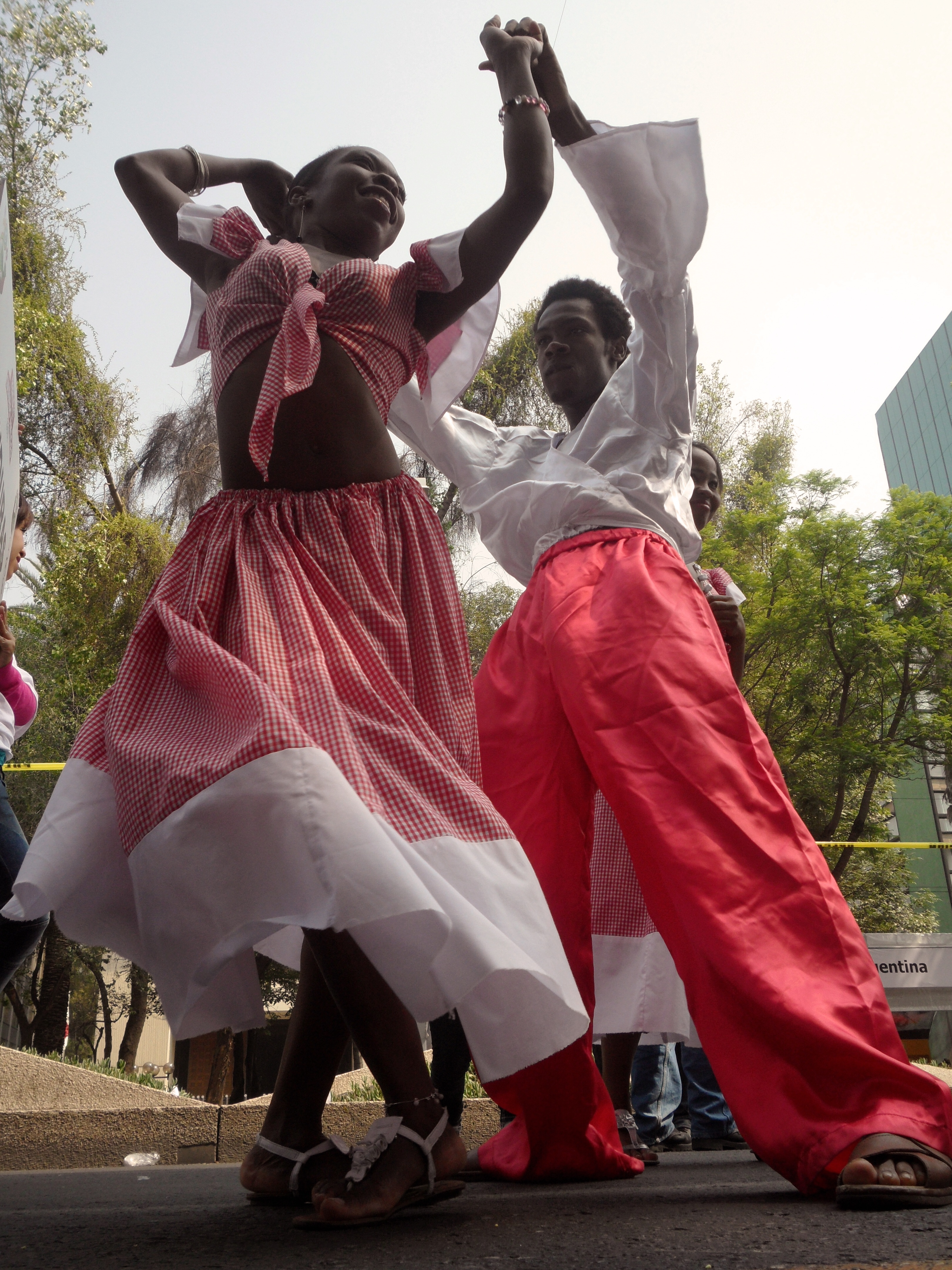
National Costume :
Karabela (Female) and Zaka (Male)

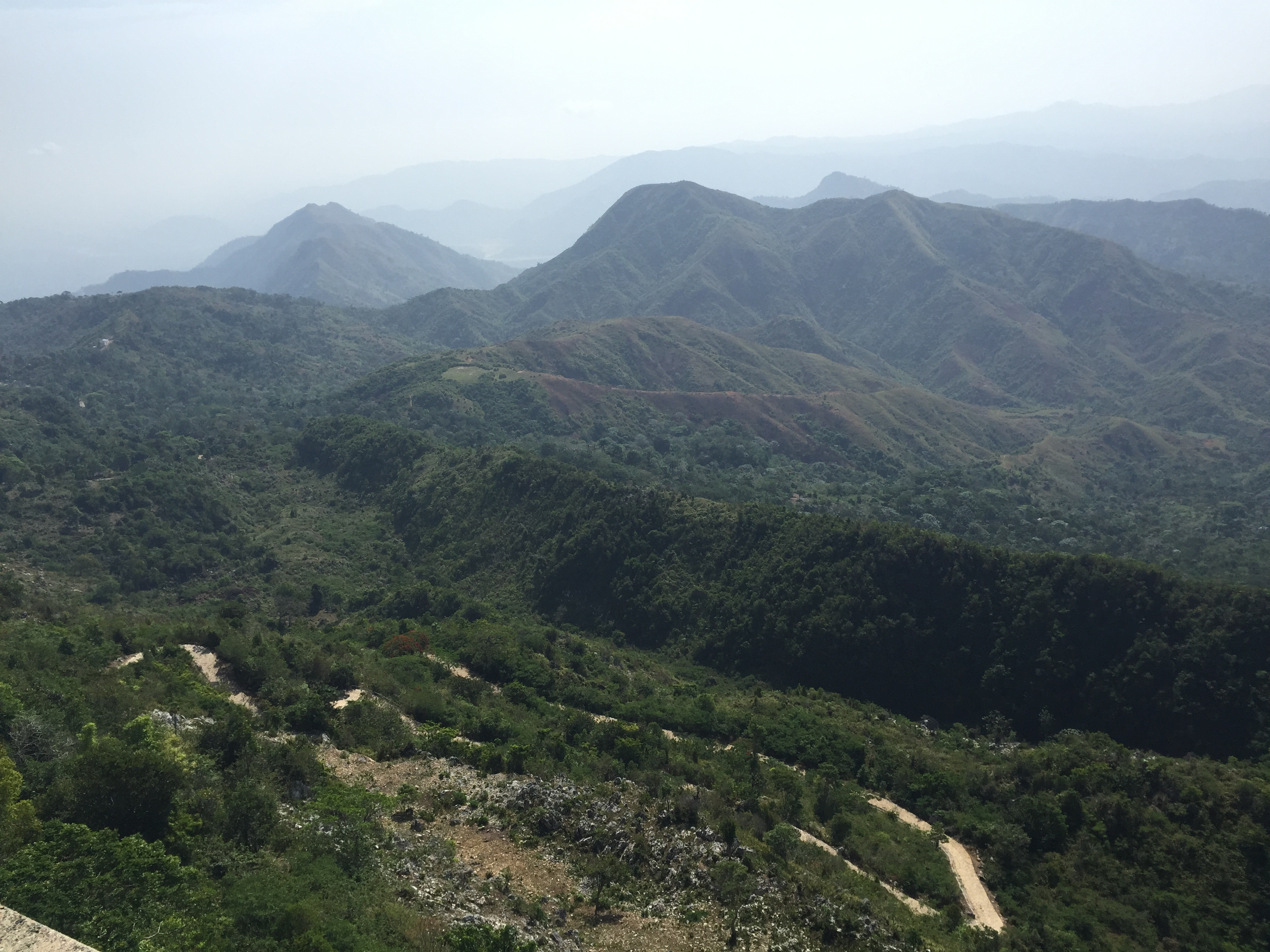
National Mountain:
Pic Makaya

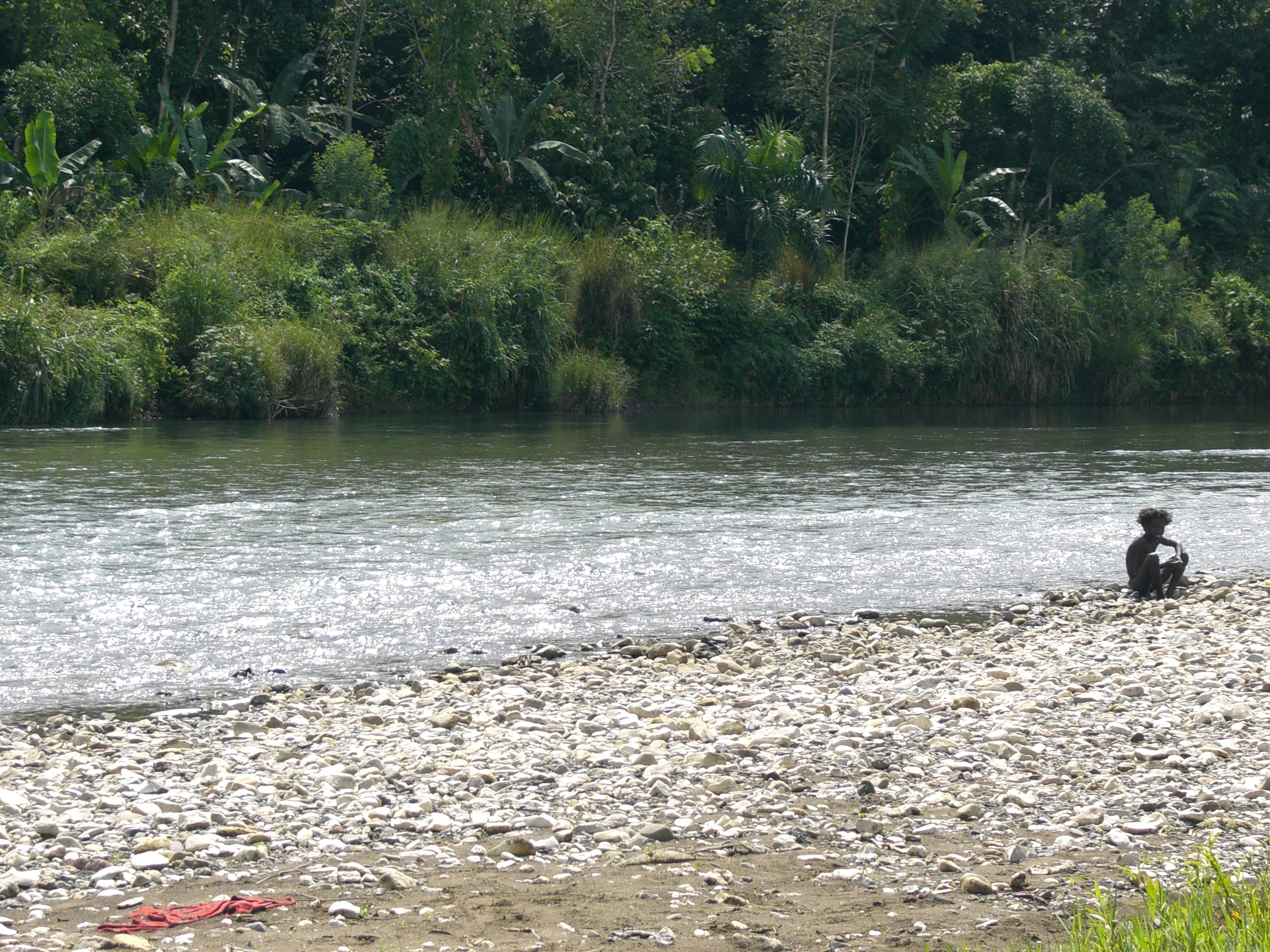
National River:
Artibonite River

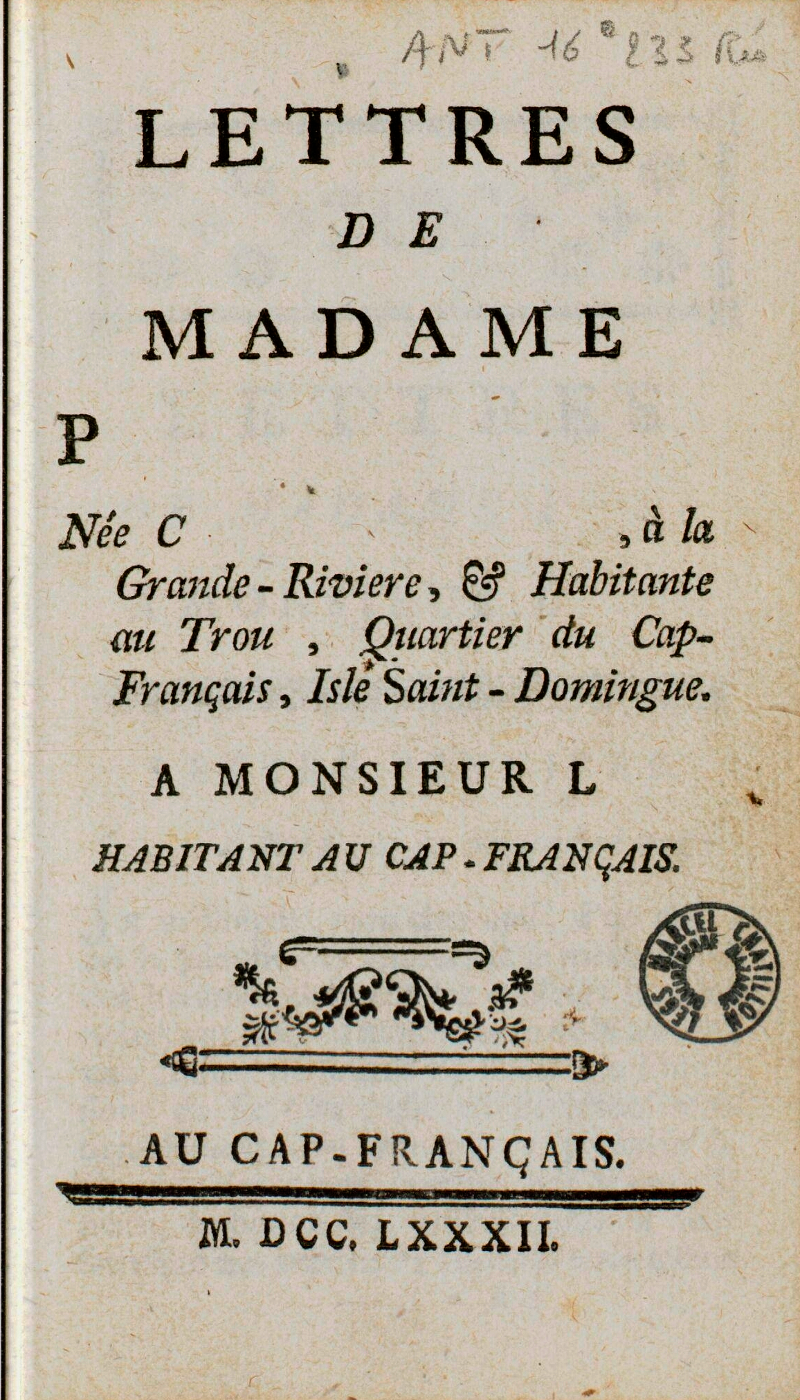
National Language:
Haitian Creole

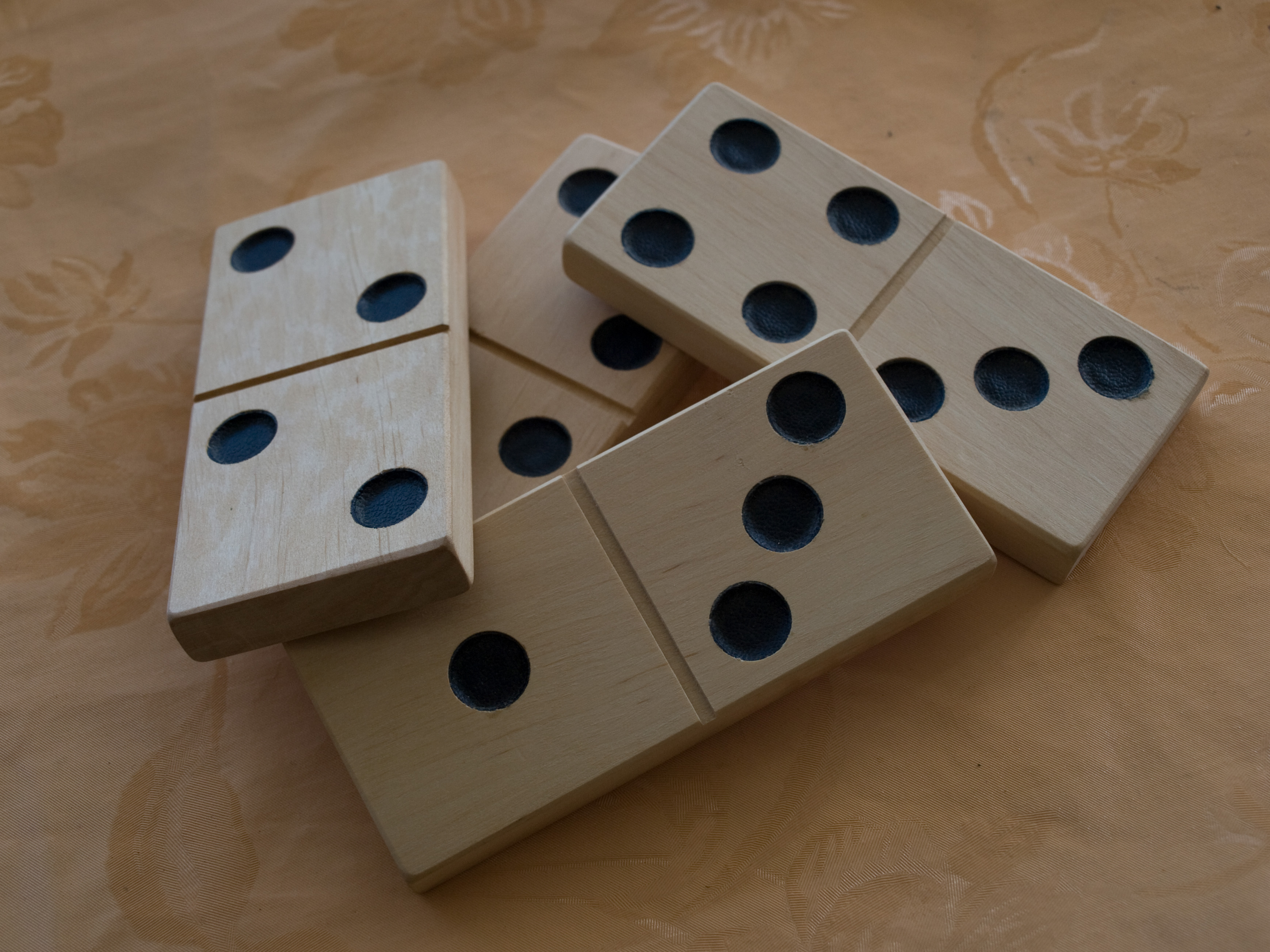
National Pastime: Dominoes

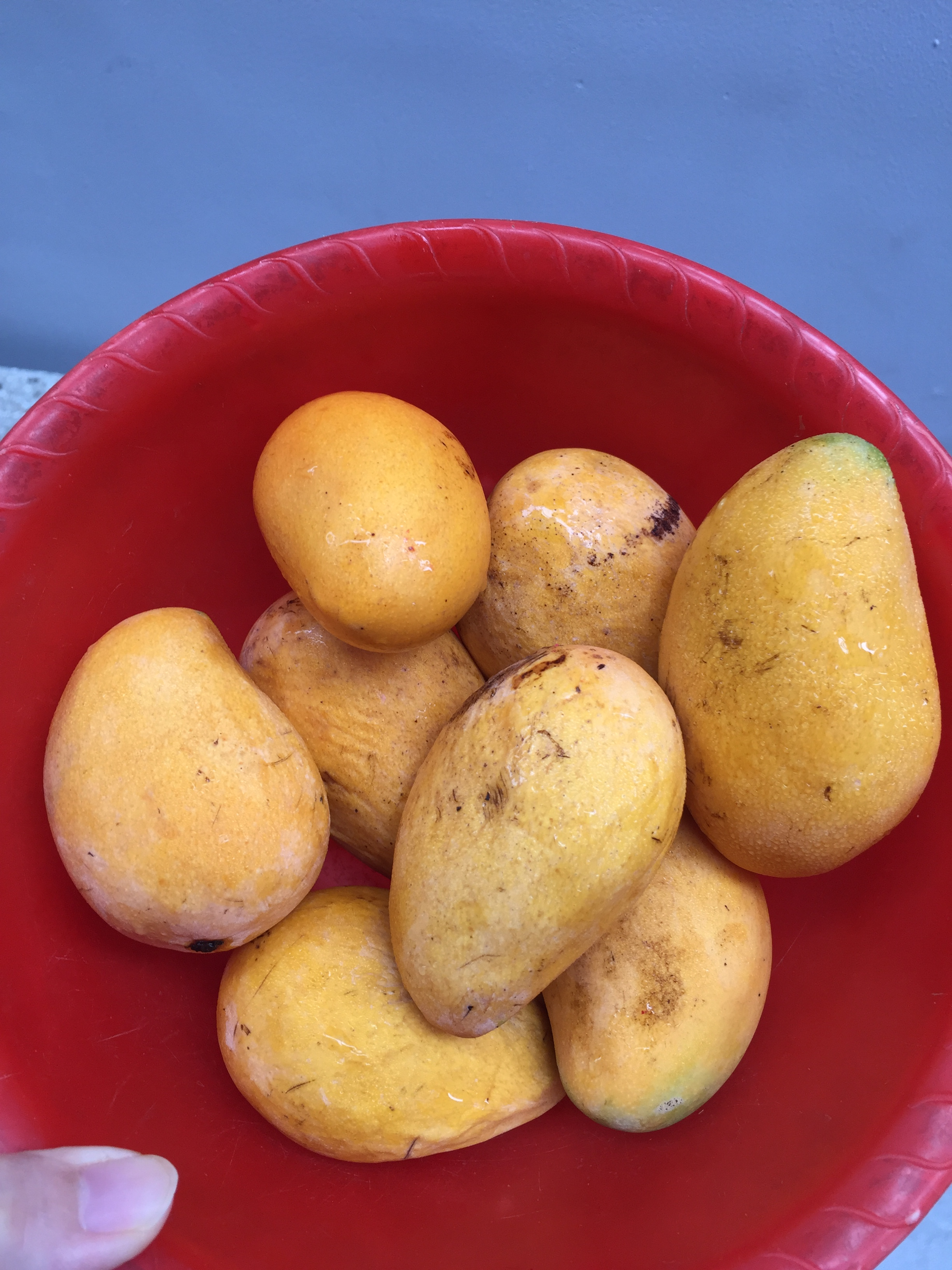
National Fruit:
Mango Francique

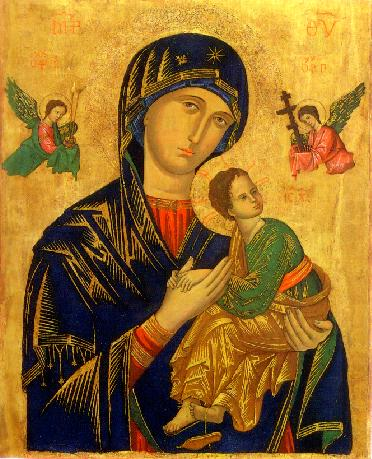
Patron Saint:
Our Lady of Perpetual Succor (Catholicism), Ezili Dantor (Vodou)
