= Choucoune =

"Choucoune" (Haitian Creole: Choukoun), was the nickname of a Haitian woman in a lyrical passage that praises her beauty. It may refer to:

- "Choucoune" (poem), an 1883 Haitian Creole poem by Haitian Oswald Durand
- "Choucoune" (song), an 1893 Haitian Creole song composed by Michel Mauléart Monton with lyrics from the poem by Durand, completely rewritten in English as the 1957 song "Yellow Bird"
