= Nicolas Geffrard =

Nicolas Geffrard may refer to:

- Nicolas Geffrard (musician)
- Nicolas Geffrard (general)
