= Musical salute =

Musical salute may refer to:

- Personal anthem, music played to announce the arrival of a dignitary
- Fanfare, a musical flourish
