= Monton (surname) =

Monton is a surname. Notable people with the surname include:

- Carmen Montón (born 1976), Spanish politician
- Katrina Monton (born 1987), Canadian water polo player
- Michel Mauléart Monton (1855–1898), Haitian musician and composer
- Vince Monton, Australian cinematographer, writer, and director
