= Othello Bayard =

Haitian musician (1885–1971)

Louis Achille Othello Bayard "de Cayes" (1885–1971) was a Haitian musician, violinist, poet, and composer. He was notable for composing the music of the patriotic song "Haïti Chérie".

== Biography ==
Othello Bayard was born in 1885 in the city of Les Cayes. January 1, 1925, Bayard composed "Souvenir d’Haïti", a poem set to music and it will become the second Haitian patriotic hymn as "Haïti Chérie" after the national anthem, "La Dessalinienne".

He wrote his poem in Haitian Creole as some other Haitian poets at that time did, in resistance to some Francophone Haitian elite who collaborated with the American occupier who had just landed in Haiti in 1915 for a long occupation of the country until 1934. Creole allows this return to indigenous and African origins of the population whose ancestors were slaves.

At the beginning of 21st century, was opened a music school in Les Cayes which bears the name of this poet and musician, the Institut Othello Bayard des Cayes.
