= Choucoune (song) =

19th-century Haitian song composed by Michel Mauléart Monton

Song
- Language: Haitian Creole
- English title: "Yellow Bird"
- Written: 1893
- Composer: Michel Mauléart Monton
- Lyricist: Oswald Durand

"Choucoune" is a 19th-century Haitian song composed by Michel Mauléart Monton with lyrics from a poem by Oswald Durand. It was rewritten with English lyrics in the 20th century as "Yellow Bird". The exotica musician Arthur Lyman made the song a hit in 1961.

== Choucoune ==
One of Oswald Durand's most famous works, the 1883 Choucoune is a lyrical poem that praises the beauty of a Haitian woman of that nickname. Michel Mauléart Monton, an American-born pianist with a Haitian father and American mother composed music for the poem in 1893, appropriating some French and Caribbean fragments to create his tune. The song "Choucoune" was first performed in Port-au-Prince on 14 May 1893. It became a popular méringue lente (slow méringue) in Haiti, and was played prominently during the bicentennial celebrations in Port-au-Prince in 1949. "Choucoune" was recorded by Katherine Dunham and her Ensemble for the Decca album Afro-Caribbean Songs and Rhythms released in 1946 (with the title spelled as "Choucounne"), and was first recorded in Haiti by Emerante (Emy) de Pradines for her Voodoo - Authentic Music of Haiti album (Remington R-199-151) released in the US in 1953.

Another version of "Choucoune" was recorded by Puerto Rican singer Lolita Cuevas with famed Haitian guitarist and arranger Frantz Casseus and is featured on Smithsonian Folkways' album Haiti Folk Songs released in 1953.

The song also appeared in the 1957 calypso-exploitation film Calypso Heat Wave, performed by the Tarriers and sung by the group's lead singer, Alan Arkin.

== Versions ==
=== Yellow Bird ===
"Yellow Bird"

Single by Arthur Lyman

from the album Percussion Spectacular!
- B-side: "Havah Nagilah"
- Released: 1961
- Genre: Calypso
- Length: 2:41
- Label: Hi-Fi
- Songwriters: Alan Bergman; Marilyn Keith; Norman Luboff

The English rendering of "Choucoune", "Yellow Bird", first appeared on the album Calypso Holiday, a 1957 release by the Norman Luboff Choir, with Luboff having arranged the song in the calypso style that become popular in the English-speaking world in the mid-1950s. The lyrics for "Yellow Bird", by Alan and Marilyn Bergman, have no connection with the narrative of the Durand poem—other than the poem features the words "ti zwazo" (little bird) in its refrain, and so the original Haitian song is sometimes called "Ti Zwazo" or "Ti Zwezo". The song became a minor hit at number 70 on the Billboard Hot 100 for the Mills Brothers in 1959. Its most successful incarnation came in the summer of 1961 when the Arthur Lyman Group reached number four on the Billboard Hot 100 and number two on the newly formed Easy Listening chart with their Hawaiian-flavored instrumental version, which bested a rival instrumental single release by Lawrence Welk (US number 61; CAN number 5).

Several versions of "Yellow Bird" were recorded and released in Jamaica around the late 1950s/1960s. Jamaican mento/calypso singers renditions include Lord Jellicoe (Hilary ILP-1040), Keith Stewart (WIRL 1031), Count Frank (WIRL 1058), Roy Fuller (Tiger 002/Dynamic 3312), Archie Lewis (Federal 213) and the Joy Makers (Somb, 1976).

"Yellow Bird" has also been recorded by Keely Smith, Roger Whitaker, Davy Graham, Roger Williams, Johnny Tillotson, the Brothers Four, Gary Crosby, Lawrence Welk, the Paragons and Paul Clayton. The song continues to be popularly associated with calypso and the Caribbean, and is often performed by steelpan bands—but some versions, such as Chris Isaak's from Baja Sessions, show a Hawaiian flavor. In 1970, Fairport Convention recorded the song for their album Live at the L.A. Troubadour.

==== In popular culture ====
Vivian Vance sang "Yellow Bird" in a two-part Here's Lucy episode, "Lucy Goes Hawaiian", which aired February 15 and February 22, 1971. Vance sang it in a high falsetto, with a calypso beat—dressed in yellow with feathers like a canary (including a long tail feather)—and perched on a swing decorated as a nest.

The October 23, 1989 broadcast of the CBS TV series Murphy Brown entitled "Miles' Big Adventure" ends with guest star Yeardley Smith serenading her unwilling object of desire Miles Silverberg with a snippet of "Yellow Bird".

A Portuguese percussion band played the song in a Full House episode, "The House Meets the House - Part 2" at Walt Disney World while Michelle Tanner danced to the song.

The Wiggles recorded their version on their Let's Eat album and DVD.

"To Bowl or Not to Bowl", an episode of The Looney Tunes Show that first aired on July 27, 2011, featured an uptempo, ska-like version of "Yellow Bird" during the Merrie Melodies song segment of the same name performed by Holland Greco.

The song appears in the 2012 Australian film The Sapphires and on the soundtrack album.

A 1960s commercial for Aunt Jemima pancakes appropriates the music from the song with lyrics that promote the product: "Wow-e-ay, it's Aunt Jemima Day".

In the Monty Python sketch "Spot the Loony", one of the characters is named "Miles Yellowbird, up high in banana tree". The name quotes the opening words of the Bergman lyrics.

The song "Why" from the Jonathan Larson musical Tick, Tick... Boom! includes a reference to this song, as Larson reminisces about singing it in a talent show at the Y when he was nine.

A version of "Yellow Bird" performed by Sol3 Mio, first released in 2013 on their eponymous album, is played over the closing credits of the second episode ("Framed", aired June 28, 2022) of season 2 of Only Murders in the Building. The episode introduced the late Bunny Folger's foul-mouthed parrot, Mrs. Gambolini.

=== Don't Ever Love Me ===
"Don't Ever Love Me"

Single by Harry Belafonte

from the album Belafonte Sings of the Caribbean
- A-side: "Mama Look at Bubu"
- Released: 1957
- Genre: Calypso
- Length: 2:46
- Label: RCA Victor
- Songwriter: Lord Burgess

Harry Belafonte had a 1957 single release entitled "Don't Ever Love Me" set to different English lyrics, written by Lord Burgess to Michel Mauleart Monton's setting for "Choucune". Initially the B-side of "Mama Look at Bubu" (number 11), "Don't Ever Love Me" itself entered the Billboard Hot 100 at number 90. The song can also be found on the CD album Harry Belafonte - All Time Greatest Hits Vol. I (track #2).

== See also ==
- Choucoune (poem)
- Cabane Choucoune
- Haïti Chérie
- Music of Haiti
- Yellow Bird (cocktail)
