= Justin Lhérisson =

Haitian writer, lawyer, journalist, and teacher

Justin Lhérisson (10 February 1873, in Port-au-Prince – 15 November 1907) was a Haitian writer, lawyer, journalist, and teacher. He is best known for two novels, La Famille des Pitite-Caille (1905) and Zoune Chez sa Ninnaine (1906), and for being the author of the lyrics of Haiti's national anthem, La Dessalinienne.

Born in Port-au-Prince, Lhérisson held a law degree and worked as a lawyer, journalist, and teacher. As a history teacher, he published a book on the Spanish colonial period of Haiti's history. He also founded the periodical Le Soir and wrote two books of poetry, Les Chants de l'Aurore (1893) and Passe-temps (1893). Along with his contemporaries Frédéric Marcelin and Fernand Hibbert he worked to establish a uniquely Haitian novel.
