= Quand nos Aïeux brisèrent leurs entraves =

Former unofficial anthem of Haiti (1893–1903)

English: 'When Our Ancestors Broke Their Chains'
- Former de facto anthem of Haiti
- Also known as: Lè zansèt nou kase chenn yo (Haitian Creole)
- Lyrics: Oswald Durand
- Music: Occide Jeanty
- Adopted: 1893
- Relinquished: 1903
- Succeeded by: "La Dessalinienne"

Audio sample
- Simplified chord progression of "Quand nos Aïeux brisèrent leurs entraves": file; help

"Quand nos Aïeux brisèrent leurs entraves" ('When Our Fathers Broke Their Chains') was the unofficial anthem of Haiti from 1893 to 1903. The lyrics were written by Haitian poet Oswald Durand. It was officially replaced by "La Dessalinienne", the current national anthem of Haiti.

== History ==
The anthem was originally a poem written by Oswald Durand. In 1893, a visiting German warship set course to the Haitian capital of Port-au-Prince to stopover and by protocol that required that a national anthem be performed. At the time, Haiti did not have an anthem, so the composer Occide Jeanty offered to compose music to the patriotic poem and it was completed later that night. It debuted aboard the ship. It remained as an unofficial national anthem until La Dessalinienne officially became the national anthem commemorating the 100th anniversary of the Haitian Revolution on January 1, 1904. The anthem still remains in use as a presidential salute.

== Lyrics ==
French original

Quand nos Aïeux brisèrent leurs entraves
Ce n’était pas pour se croiser les bras
Pour travailler en maîtres les esclaves
Ont embrassé corps à corps le trépas.
Leur sang à flots engraissa nos collines,
A notre tour, jaunes et noirs, allons !
Creusons le sol légué par Dessalines :
Notre fortune est là dans nos vallons.

Refrain :
L'indépendance est éphémère ;
Sans le droit à l'égalité !
Pour fouler, heureux, cette terre
Il nous faut la devise austère :
Dieu ! Le Travail ! La Liberté !

Quoi de plus beau que ces fils de l’Afrique
Qui, trois cent ans dans tous les maux plongés,
Tournent leurs fers, leur carcan et leur trique
Contre la force et les vieux préjugés !
En bas voyez ! c’est la noble bannière
Cernant les noirs qui vont mourir là-haut
Non ! leur torrent avec Lamartinière
Descend fougueux à la Crête-à-Pierrot.

Refrain : ;
Tout cela serait éphémère
Sans le droit à l’égalité !
Pour fouler, heureux, cette terre
Il nous faut la devise austère :
« Dieu ! Le Travail ! La Liberté ! »

De Rochambeau les cohortes altières,
Quelques instants, suspendirent leur feu,
Pour saluer le héros de Vertières,
Capois-La-Mort, grand comme un demi-dieu
Vers le progrès, crions comme ce brave :
« Noirs ! En avant ! En avant ! » Et bêchons
Le sol trempé des sueurs de l’esclave !
Nous avons là ce qu’ailleurs nous cherchons !

Refrain :
Sans quoi, tout devient éphémère ;
Pas d’ordre et pas d’égalité !
Pour fouler, heureux, cette terre,
Il nous faut la devise austère :
« Dieu ! Le travail ! La liberté ! »

Sang des martyrs dont la pourpre écumante
A secoué nos chaînes et nos jougs !
Chavanne, Ogé, sur la route infamante,
Toi, vieux Toussaint, dans ton cachot de Joux
O précurseurs, dont les dernières fibres
Ont dû frémir, vous les porte-flambeaux
En nous voyant maintenant fiers et libres,
Conseillez-nous du fond de vos tombeaux !

Refrain :
Votre bonheur est éphémère ;
Ayez droit à l’égalité !
Pour fouler, heureux, cette terre,
Il vous faut la devise austère :
« Dieu ! Le travail ! La liberté ! »

A l’œuvre donc, descendants de l’Afrique,
Jaunes et noirs, fils du même berceau !
L’antique Europe et la jeune Amérique
Nous voient de loin tenter le rude assaut.
Bêchons le sol qu’en l’an mil huit cent quatre,
Nous ont conquis nos aïeux au bras fort.
C’est notre tour à présent de combattre
Avec ce cri : « Le progrès ou la mort ! »

Refrain :
A l’œuvre ! Ou tout est éphémère !
Ayons droit à l’égalité !
Nous foulerons, plus fiers, la terre,
Avec cette devise austère :
« Dieu ! Le travail ! La liberté ! »

English translation

When our fathers broke their chains
this was not to fold their arms
and to let slaves work for them as masters
Side by side, till death.
Their streams of blood soaked our hills
But now our turn came, Yellows and Blacks, onward!
Plough the soil of Dessalines:
Our wealth is here in our valleys.

Refrain:
Independence is fugitive
without the right of equality!
To plough this soil with joy
we need this strict motto:
“God! Labor! Freedom!”

What can there be more beautiful than this children of Africa
who, after three hundred years of deepest bondage cast,
turned iron, yoke and truncheon
against the hostile powers and against old prejudices!
See from down there! It is the noble banner,
that unites the Blacks, who are ready to die there at the top!
But no! The crowds with Lamartinière
descend like foaming flood from La Crête-à-Pierrot.

Refrain:
Everything is fugitive
without the right of equality!
To plough this soil with joy
we need this strict motto:
“God! Labor! Freedom!”

The proud troops of Rochambeau
suspended fire for a moment
To salute the hero of Vertières
Capois-la-Mort, great as a second god.
Towards progress, cries the brave:
“Blacks, onward! Onward!” and plough
this soil, which is soaked with the sweat of slaves!
It is here, what we were hoping for to find it somewhere else.

Refrain:
Without this everything is fugitive:
Without order and freedom!
To plough this soil with joy
we need this strict motto:
“God! Labor! Freedom!”

The purple blood of the martyrs foamed
over our chains and yokes!
Chavanne, Ogé on this horrible road
you, old Toussaint, in your prison of Joux,
and our fathers, marching ahead,
with trembling hearts, they carried the torch.
Us, who are now proud and free,
they guide us from the ground of their tombs!

Refrain:
Your fortune is fugitive
without the right of equality!
To plough this soil with joy
we need this strict motto:
“God! Labor! Freedom!”

Now to work, you descendants of Africa,
Brown and Black, children from the same cradle!
The old Europe and the young America
try again to suppress us from far away.
Plough the soil, which, in the year eighteen hundred and four
our fathers conquered with strong arm.
Now it is our turn to fight,
with the cry “Progress or Death!”

Refrain:
Now to labor! Or everything is fugitive!
We deserve the right of equality!
We plough this soil with even more pride
and with this strict motto:
“God! Labor! Freedom!”

== See also ==
- Flag of Haiti
- "Haïti Chérie"
- Music of Haiti
