= Nicolas Geffrard (general) =

Haitian politician (1761–1806)

Nicolas Geffrard (10 November 1761 - May 31, 1806) was a Haitian general, and a participant in the Haitian Revolution. He was a signatory to the Haitian Declaration of Independence.

Born on the Périgny estate in Camp-Perrin, Geffrard was one of seven children born to Nicolas Geffrard pere and Julie Coudro, alongside Mathurin, Fénélon, Marie-Anne, Marie Catherine, Louis and Jacques.

After Haiti's independence, was made military head of the southern peninsula, where he supervised the construction of the Fort des Platons (today in the town of Torbeck).

Jean-Jacques Dessalines sent General Nicolas Geffrard to put down the last uprisings of the supporters of Lamour Desrances in Jacmel. Lamour Desrances was arrested and his forces annihilated. Jean-Jacques Dessalines thus became master of the situation with 15,000 troops.

Geffrard was the father of:

- Fabre (1806-1878, born to Marguerite Claudine Lejeune; general and later president of Haiti)
- Marie-Marthe (8 May 1799-?, born to Geffrard and Anne-Catherine)
- Alexandre (ca. 1805-?, born to Geffrard and an unknown parent)
- Marie-Catherine (?-?, born to Geffrard and Geneviève Lannière)
- Marie-Madeleine (?-?, born to Geffrard and an unknown parent)
- Adélaïde Marie-Antoinette (2 May 1804, born to Geffrard and Mélisse Gaspard)

Through this brother Fénélon, Nicolas was the uncle of the musician Nicolas Fénélon Geffrard, the co-writer of "La Dessalinienne"; it became the national anthem of Haiti in 1904.
