= Occide Jeanty =

Haitian composer and conductor (1860–1936)

Occide Jeanty (1860–1936) was a Haitian composer, trumpeter, pianist and music director.

== Biography ==
Occide Jeanty was born in 1860 in Port-au-Prince He was educated at Alexandre Pétion High School in Port-au-Prince. His father, Occilius Jeanty (1830–1882), was both director of the Central School of Music in Port-au-Prince, professor of mathematics at Alexandre Pétion High School, and director of the Military Music Corps attached to the National Palace.

After attending music classes at his father's Central School of Music, he obtained a scholarship to study at Paris with Jean-Baptiste Arban and Antoine François Marmontel.

In 1885, back in Haiti, the Haitian President, Lysius Salomon, appointed him on recommendation to the National Palace's Military Music Corps.

He composes mainly for the National Palace.

In 1915, during the occupation of Haiti by American forces, he left the army with the rank of general. He became a music teacher at Alexandre Pétion High School in Port-au-Prince.

In 1922, he was recalled by the president Louis Borno. He became the conductor of the National Guard until his death in 1936.

He had about twenty children, including Lydia Occide Jeanty, Haiti's first female minister. He also had Pauline, Quetsia, Dieudonne, Zita and Carl-Henry Jeanty.

== Works ==
Occide Jeanty composed eight military marches for the National Palace.

He also composed six funeral song for Haitian dignitaries and their families, including:

- Imprécations pour Dessalines, pour la commémoration de la mort de Jean-Jacques Dessalines.
- Cher Hyppolite, pour la mort de Florvil Hyppolite
- Nos l'armes, également pour Florvil Hyppolite
- Ti Sam, pour Tirésias Simon Sam
- Sur la tombe pour Nord Alexis

He also composed four patriotic song, among which:

- Quand nos Aïeux brisèrent leurs entraves (ou Chant national), avec les paroles d'Oswald Durand.
- 1804.

He also composed polkas (Pauvres et pauvres en 1901), gavottes and méringues (Zizipan).
