= Nicolas Geffrard (musician) =

Haitian musician (1871–1930)

"La Dessalinienne" (instrumental)
Nicolas Geffrard's "La Dessalinienne" performed by the United States Navy Band

Nicolas Fénélon Geffrard (1871 – 1930) was a Haitian musician best known for composing "La Dessalinienne", the Haitian national anthem. The piece was adopted in 1904 to celebrate one hundred years of Haitian independence. He spent part of his career working in Europe. Geffrard was a nephew of the general Nicolas Geffrard.
