= Michel Mauléart Monton =

Haitian musician, pianist and composer

Michel Mauléart Monton (1855–1898), was a Haitian musician, pianist and composer. He became famous for composing the music for the méringue classic, choucoune (known as Yellow Bird in the English version)

== Biography ==
Michel Mauléart Monton was born in New Orleans, Louisiana to a Haitian father and an American mother. His father was Emilien Monton, had emigrated to Louisiana where he was a tailor. For family reasons, Michel Mauléart Monton was raised in Haiti by his older sister, Odila Monton, who owned a shop on the Rue du Magasin de l'Etat in Port-au-Prince. Subsequently, he attended music classes with Toureau Lechaud who was a well-respected Haitian musician and taught him the piano.

His musical style was a compendium of multiple influences, a musical melting pot in which he drew the charm of the rich tropical nature of Haiti, surrealism and a mixture of African music of Haitian religion, Vodou, and European classical music. He combined these influences to compose many musical pieces.

Michel Mauléart Monton is best known for putting the music méringue on the air with a poem by Haitian poet Oswald Durand called Choucoune, that had been written ten years earlier in 1883. This song was played in public for the first time in Port-au-Prince on May 14, 1893. On a slow pace and light méringue which was nicknamed "Ti zwazo" or "Ti zwezo" (French: Little bird). Choucoune was an immediate success both in Haiti and abroad, and was taken in the years 1950 to the United States under the name "Yellow bird."

== Notable works ==
Monton composed a series of polkas and méringues.

- Choucoune
- La Polka des tailleurs
- L'Amour et l'argent
- P'tit Pierre
- Les P'tits Suye pye du jeudi

== See also ==
- Choucoune (poem)
