= Choucoune (poem) =

1883 poem by Haitian poet Oswald Durand

Choucoune (Haitian Creole: Choukoun) is an 1883 poem by Haitian poet Oswald Durand. Its words are in Haitian Creole and became the lyrics to the song Choucoune, later rewritten in English as Yellow Bird, based on the words "ti zwazo" (French: petits oiseaux; little birds) from the Durand poem.

Durand's inspiration for the poem was a marabou woman named Marie Noel Belizaire—nicknamed Choucoune—who ran a restaurant in Cap-Haïtien. She met Durand, and the two had a romantic liaison. In the poem, Choucoune deserts the poet for a Frenchman's favors. Reportedly the real Choucoune and Durand parted because of the poet's serial philandering.

Marie Noel Belizaire is said to have died in 1924, her seventy-first year, having spent the last portion of her life in her native village of La-Plaine-du-Nord as a beggar—but still widely recognized as the subject of Durand's poem. Duran had been jailed, perhaps for his political activities. While in jail, he wrote the poem addressed to a bird that had perched on the window of his cell. A decade after the poem was written, Michel Mauleart Monton, also Haitian, set it to music. The song was first performed in Port-au-Prince May 14, 1893.
