= Haïti Chérie =

1925 Haitian patriotic song

"Haïti Chérie" (French pronunciation: [a.iti ʃeʁi]: Dear Haiti) is a traditional patriotic song of Haiti of a poem written by Othello Bayard that was initially called it Souvenir d'Haïti ("Memory of Haiti") and composed to music in 1925. It is widely considered as a second national anthem, and one of Haiti's most famous méringues.

== Lyrics ==
Ayiti cheri pi bon peyi pase ou nanpwen
Fòk mwen te kite w pou mwen te kapab konprann valè w
Fòk mwen te lese w pou m te k ap apresye w
Pou m santi vrèman tout sa ou te ye pou mwen

Gen bon solèy bon rivyè e bon brevaj
Anba pyebwa ou toujou jwenn bon lonbraj
Gen bon ti van ki bannou bon ti frechè
Ayiti Toma se yon peyi ki mè chè

Lè w lan peyi blan ou gen yon vye frèt ki pa janm bon
E tout lajounen ou oblije ap boule chabon
Ou pakab wè klè otan syèl la andèy
E pandan si mwa tout pyebwa pa genyen fèy

Lan peyi mwen gen solèy pou bay chalè
Diran lane tout pyebwa ap bay lonbraj
Bon briz de mè toujou soufle sou nos plaj
Ayiti Toma se yon peyi ki mè chè

Kon w lan peyi blan ou wè tout figi yon sèl koulè
Lanpwen milatrès bèl marabou, bèl grifonn kreyòl
Ki renmen bèl wòb bon poud e bon odè
Ni bèl jenn nègès ki konn di bon ti pawòl

Lan peyi mwen lè tout bèl moun si la yo
Sòti lan mès ou sòti lan sinema
Se pou gade se pou rete dyòl lolo
A la bon peyi se ti Dayiti Toma!

Lè w lan peyi blan ou pa wè mango ni kòk di tou
Lanpwen sapoti ni bèl kayimit vèt ou vyolèt
Lanpwen zanana ni bèl ti pòm kajou
Ki ban nou bon nwa pou nou fè bon ti tablèt

Ou jwenn zoranj ki sòti an Itali
Men ki fennen ki toujou mwatye pouri
An Ayiti sa si bon se koupe dwèt
E sou se rapò nou bay tout peyi payèt

Lè w lan peyi mwen kote ou pase tout lon chemen
Se bonjou konpè e makomè e pitit la yo?
Sa n pa wè konsa manyen rantre ti bren
Pou n bwa ti kichòy pou nou jwe de ti kout zo.

Fin bay lan men se rantre lan gran pale
Se politik se movèz sitiyasyon
Sa pou nou fè se pou nou pran li kou l ye
Men bon Dye si bon la ban nou benediksyon

Lè w ou lan peyi blan ou pè pwomennen nuit tankou jou
Tout moun pè mache prese prese wa di se chen fou
Kote yo prale pouki y ap kouri konsa?
Yo pè pèdi tan yo pa janm di: kouman sa?

Lan peyi mwen moun pa rete avèk lè
Genyen libète ou gen tan pou pran frechè
Kote ou pase se bonjou se bay lan men
Moun pa janm prese yo koze tout lon chemen

Lè w an Ayiti ou pa janm manke tan pou soufle
Sak pa fèt jodi ou k ap fè li demen si ou vle
Kan demen rive ke l bon ou kel pa bon
Sa pa fè anyen tout moun konn di bon dye bon.

An Ayiti moun pa janm dezespere
Nou gen la fwa lan yon Dye ki pa janm manti
N ap fè jodi kan demen pa asire
A la bon peyi o mon Dye, se Ayiti!

Haiti Chérie translates to(translation corrected by @growninhaiti):
Haiti, my beloved, no other land is more beautiful than you.
I had to leave you, in order to better understand your value
I had to leave you, for me to appreciate you
So I could truly feel all that you were for me

There is sunshine, nice rivers and great drinks
Underneath the trees, you'll always find great shade
Where you'll find a gentle breeze to keep you cool
Haiti, is a country dear to me

In the white man's land, you're freezing and it's never good
And all day, you're forced to burn coal
You can't see clearly because the sky is always dark
And for 6 months, all trees are without leaves

In my country, there is sunshine to provide heat
All year long, the trees continue to provide shade
A soft breeze always blowing on our beaches
Haiti, is a country dear to me

Once in the white man's country, all faces are one color
There is no variety such as our different shades of Kreyòl (Milatrès, Marabou, and Grifonn)
That love beautiful dresses, powders and fine scents
Nor black beauties that know the sweetest things to say

In my country, when all of these beautiful people leave church,
it's like going to the movies
you have to see this, you would remain wide mouthed and open eyed
What an amazing country Haiti is!

When you're in the white man's country, you don't see mangoes or roosters anywhere
Neither sapoti or beautiful green and purple star apples
Neither pineapples or beautiful cashew apples
that give us great cashews to make delicious brittle with

You'll find oranges that came from Italy
But that are passed ripe and half rotten
In Haiti, everything is finger licking good!
And on that note, we're better than any other country

When you're in my country, wherever you go and along your path
it's: "hello sir" "hello miss" "how are the kids?"
without knowing,
you're invited in for a drink and to play some games.

Every handshake invites a conversation
Its politics, it's a bad situation
what we need to do is accept it how it is
If God is good, he will grant us salvation

When you're in the white man's country, you're afraid to go out day or night
Everyone is walking so fast that you'd think they're crazy dogs
Where are they going? Why are they running?
They in such a hurry that they never stop to ask how you're doing

In my country, people don't go by time
You have the liberty to take your time
Wherever you go, it's "hello" and friendly handshakes
People are never in a rush, we chat along our path

When you're in Haiti, you always have enough time to whistle
what doesn't get done today, can get done tomorrow if you want
If tomorrow works, cool... If it doesn't... cool.
It doesn't matter, everyone knows that God is good

In Haiti, people are never desperate
we trust in a God that never lies
We'll do whatever we can today, because tomorrow is never certain
What a great country, o my God! It's Haiti!

== Versions ==
- Audrey Landers, is an American actress and singer who recorded a version in 1984.
- Cornelia Schutt, known by her stage-name TiCorn, is a Haitian folk singer and songwriter recorded Haiti Cherie in the 1960s.
- Georges Moustaki, has long maintained "Haïti Chérie" in his Francophone repertoire.
- Harry Belafonte, has recorded several versions of "Haïti Chérie" in English.
- Nancy Ames, recorded a version in Haitian Creole in 1963 or 1964.

== See also ==
- Flag of Haiti
- La Dessalinienne
- Music of Haiti
