= Oswald Durand =

Haitian poet and politician (1840–1906)

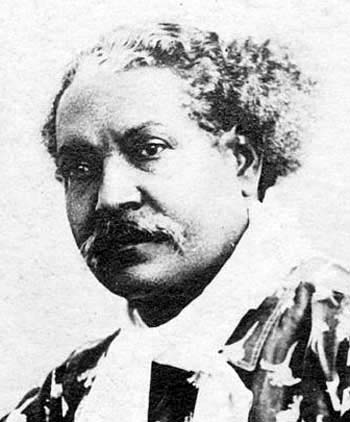

Oswald Durand (September 17, 1840 – April 22, 1906) was a Haitian poet and congressman, and one of the most influential literary figures in Haitian history. He is said to be "to Haiti what Shakespeare is to England, and Dante to Italy." He was also a writer and poet of French and Creole expression, considered as the national poet of Haiti and was judged as a Romantic poet and one of the most prolific ones of the 19th-century.

20th-century poetic successors such as René Depestre and Jacques Roumain praised Durand for his authentic expressions and honored him as a forerunner of Haitian indigenism.

He was born in Saint-Louis du Nord on 17 September 1840. In 1842, both his parents died in an earthquake that devastated the city of Cape Haitian. Oswald Durand and his sister were welcomed by their maternal grandmother who raised them. He spent most of his childhood outside the city where he was born.

Because of political instabilities in Haiti, he was forced to leave school and to educate himself without having recourse to a teacher.

His most famous works are Choucoune, a lyrical poem praising the beauty of a Haitian woman, and Chant National, a lyrical historic poem which became as popular as the presidential hymn.

Durand worked as a teacher before being elected to Congress in 1885. He was subsequently re-elected six times for this position. He founded or served as advisor, or writer for several newspapers and other publications.

== Career ==
In 1860, he became a teacher in an elementary school and in 1867 he held the post of director of a secondary school in the city of Gonaives. Before he turns out to be a Professor he already created his periodical. In 1868, he turns into the secretary of the council of ministers and after elected delegate in 1885. In 1888, he became president of the Chamber of Deputies, being a journalist he created his own newspaper called "Bigailles". Before his death, Oswald Durand managed to concretize one of his greatest dreams. He travels to France and is received with honor by the famous Jean Francois Coppe to the society of letters people. Oswald Durand was considered a national poet, he used to denounce social relations in his country. In his text Poetry of Revolution Amy Reinsel stated that "In general, the poems in Rires et Pleurs illustrate the various reasons Durand was hailed as Haiti's national poet both during his lifetime and after his death" (Reinsel 106). One of Oswald Durand ambition was to show the social relations of his country, the Haitian nature and the history of his country. The author uses themes such as love, earth, slavery and revolution in his text. Indeed, slavery in Haiti was cruel. Slaves were subjected to inhuman treatment. The slave was considered a moveable good. The rest of Sunday's day was not respected.

=== Patriotism ===
In Epopee des Aïeux he reveals himself as a patriot of the Haitian nation. In his text, he extols the exploits of our ancestors who fought to free the enslaved. He presents the history of his country as being the most wonderful of ancient stories with glorious facts. Lucmane Vieux in his article Poetry / Battle of Vertieres describes Oswald Durand 's Epopee des Aieux. Lucmane Vieux presented a passage from Oswald Durand text and stated that: "Dessalines, one leap, is in the West. His powerful heels do not spare anything. More whites, more colonists! The slaves of yesterday, the damned Africans, were then masters of Quisqueya the beautiful. Here Dessalines is clearly identified for his accomplishments in the West" (Vieux). Jean-Jacques Dessalines was the one who continued the revolution after the death of Toussaint Louverture. He fought the powerful French army and proclaimed the independence of the country on January 1, 1804. He declared that Haiti was an all-black nation. It prohibited whites from acquiring land and property, per Jean-Jacques Dessalines.

Durand reveals as a patriot in his poem Ces Allemands where he describes the abuses of Germany to the Haitian government. Bob Lapierre in his book said this: "Germans, dual Prussians we tossed the money, head up, with pride, just as we toss a bone to the dogs!" (Lapierre 19). During the Luders affair, Haiti was forced to yield to German orders. They asked the Haitian government for a $20000 ransom, a letter of apology, the return of the German who was exiled and an official ceremony should be organized in honor of the German charge affairs.

== Judicial Trouble ==
Besides the fact that Oswald Durand was a poet and a writer he also had problems with justice. In 1883, he went to jail because of his politic ideas. During his time in jail, he wrote his famous poem Choucoune. He disagreed with the government of the President Lysius Felicite Salomon and became a political refugee. During his judicial demises, he takes refuge in a foreign embassy in the city of Cap-Haitian. During his refuge, he wrote a recension of a poem title Mon Ile Bien-Aimee.

== Famous works ==
In his text, Choucoune Oswald Durand extols the beauty of the Haitian woman. The author has created a work that went beyond the other works of his time. He had created a kind of metapoem. His Choucoune work took part in the world literature. His work has been appreciated by international readers. He used the Creole language in his text. He used rhymes from foreign models. In his text, A Primer of Haitian Literature in Kreyol George Lang tells us the type of rhymes that he used: "Here too Kreyòl is subject to a European rhyme-scheme: ABABCCDD. As well, the irony that a Kreyòl-speaking object of desire (Kreyòl itself?) was stolen away by a French-speaker as recounted in a poem cast into a French verse form was likely not lost on readers of the time" (Lang 132).

This text was also used by other people and later became very popular. Michel Mauleart Monton, a pianist of American origin, composed the music of the poem in 1893. The music was performed for the first time in Port-au-Prince on May 14, 1893. The same text Choukoun later becomes the lyric of a song. The lyric of this text for native English is known as yellow birds. The musical lyric was arranged in Calypso style. The lyric was performed by Harry Belafonte and Celia Cruz and was successful in the summer of 1961 when the band Arthur Lyman reached number 4 of Billboard Hot100 and number 2 of the brand new easy listening with its Hawaiian instrumental version.

Another important work of Oswald Durand is Quand nos Aieux briserent leurs entraves which becomes the national song and national anthem of Haiti from 1803 to 1904.

== Selected works ==
- Rires et Pleurs - published 1897
- Choucoune - published 1883
- Chant National
- Ces Allemands - published 14 June 1872
- Pantoum Triste
- La Mort de nos Cocotiers

== See also ==
- Haitian Revolution
- Jean-Jacques Dessalines
- Michel Mauléart Monton
