= La Dessalinienne =

National anthem of Haiti

English: 'The Dessalinian'
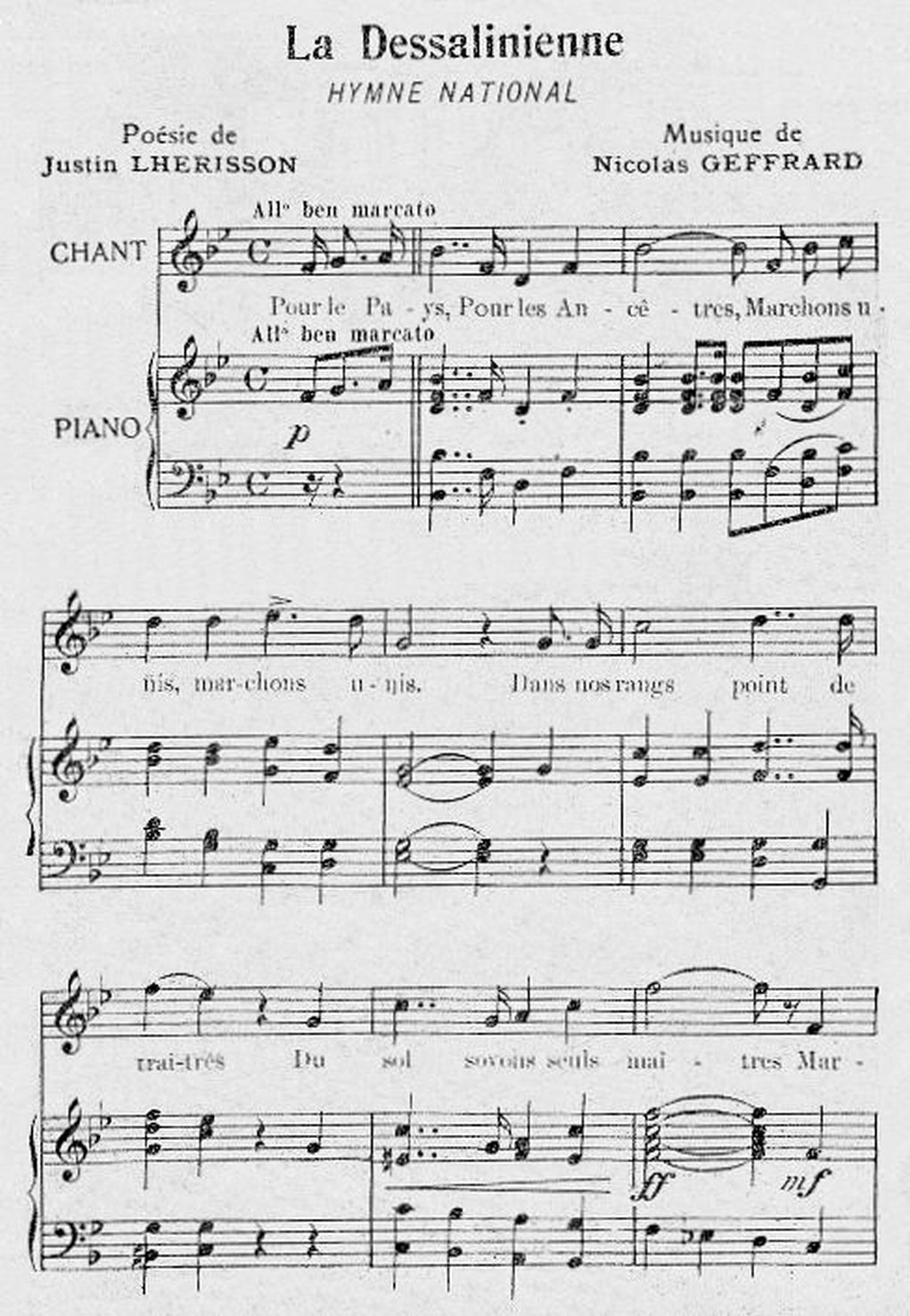
- Sheet music
- National anthem of Haiti
- Also known as: Desalinyèn (Haitian Creole)
- Lyrics: Justin Lhérisson, 1903
- Music: Nicolas Geffrard, 1903
- Adopted: January 1, 1904

Audio sample
- U.S. Navy Band instrumental rendition in B-flat major: file; help

"La Dessalinienne" (pronounced [la dɛsalinjɛn]; lit. ''The Dessalinian'') is the national anthem of Haiti. This march was written by Justin Lhérisson and composed by Nicolas Geffrard.

== Etymology ==
"La Dessalinienne" is named in honor of Haiti's revolutionary leader and first ruler Jean-Jacques Dessalines. The title was suggested by historian Clément Lanier.

== History ==
To commemorate the 100th anniversary of the Haitian Revolution, a competition was held for a national anthem in 1903. The poetic words of Justin Lhérisson and martial composition of Nicolas Geffrard won over the judges, who preferred it to "L'Artibonitienne" by Capois diplomat Louis Edouard Pouget.

The anthem was premiered at an October 1903 celebration of the Armée Indigène's entry into Port-au-Prince organised by the Association du Petit Théâtre. It was sung by Auguste de Pradines, also known as Kandjo. The text and music were printed at Bernard's in Port-au-Prince and distributed throughout the country during the week. It was officially adopted as the national anthem in 1904.

== Lyrics ==
As a one-verse rendition can be relatively short, a common way to lengthen a performance is to perform an abridged arrangement consisting of the first verse immediately followed by the last.

=== Official lyrics ===
French original

Pour le Pays, pour les Ancêtres,
Marchons unis, marchons unis.
Dans nos rangs point de traîtres !
Du sol soyons seuls maîtres.
Marchons unis, marchons unis
Pour le Pays, pour les Ancêtres,
Marchons, marchons, marchons unis,
Pour le Pays, pour les Ancêtres…

Pour les Aïeux, pour la Patrie
Bêchons joyeux, bêchons joyeux
Quand le champ fructifie
L'âme se fortifie
Bêchons joyeux, bêchons joyeux
Pour les Aïeux, pour la Patrie
Bêchons, bêchons, bêchons joyeux
Pour les Aïeux, pour la Patrie.

Pour le Pays et pour nos Pères
Formons des Fils, formons des Fils
Libres, forts et prospères
Toujours nous serons frères
Formons des Fils, formons des Fils
Pour le Pays et pour nos Pères
Formons, formons, formons des Fils
Pour le Pays et pour nos Pères.

Pour les Aïeux, pour la Patrie
O Dieu des Preux, O Dieu des Preux !
Sous ta garde infinie
Prends nos droits, notre vie
O Dieu des Preux, O Dieu des Preux !
Pour les Aïeux, pour la Patrie
O Dieu, O Dieu, O Dieu des Preux
Pour les Aïeux, pour la Patrie.

Pour le Drapeau, pour la Patrie
Mourir est beau, mourir est beau !
Notre passé nous crie :
Ayez l'âme aguerrie!
Mourir est beau, mourir est beau
Pour le Drapeau, pour la Patrie
Mourir, mourir, mourir est beau
Pour le Drapeau, pour la Patrie.

IPA transcription (Note: See Help:IPA/French, French phonology, and Haitian French.)

[pu lə pe.ji pu le‿z.ã.sɛ.tɣə |]
[ma.ʃɔ̃ y.ni ma.ʃɔ̃ y.ni ‖]
[dã no ɣã pwɛ̃ də tɣɛ.tɣə |]
[dy sɔl swa.jɔ̃ sœl mɛ.tɣə ‖]
[ma.ʃɔ̃ y.ni ma.ʃɔ̃ y.ni |]
[pu lə pe.ji pu le‿z.ã.sɛ.tɣə ‖]
[ma.ʃɔ̃ ma.ʃɔ̃ ma.ʃɔ̃ y.ni |]
[pu lə pe.ji pu le‿z.ã.sɛ.tɣə ‖]

[pu le‿z.a.jø pu la pa.tɣi.jə |]
[bɛ.ʃɔ̃ ʒwa.jø bɛ.ʃɔ̃ ʒwa.jø ‖]
[kã lə ʃã fɣyk.ti.fi.jə |]
[la.mə sə fɔ.ti.fi.jə ‖]
[bɛ.ʃɔ̃ ʒwa.jø bɛ.ʃɔ̃ ʒwa.jø |]
[pu le‿z.a.jø pu la pa.tɣi.jə ‖]
[bɛ.ʃɔ̃ bɛ.ʃɔ̃ bɛ.ʃɔ̃ ʒwa.jø |]
[pu le‿z.a.jø pu la pa.tɣi.jə ‖]

[pu lə pe.ji e pu no pɛ.ɣə |]
[fɔ.mɔ̃ de fil fɔ.mɔ̃ de fil ‖]
[li.bɣə fɔ e pɣɔs.pɛ.ɣə |]
[tu.ʒu nu sə.ɣɔ̃ fɣɛ.ɣə ‖]
[fɔ.mɔ̃ de fil fɔ.mɔ̃ de fil |]
[pu lə pe.ji e pu no pɛ.ɣə ‖]
[fɔ.mɔ̃ fɔ.mɔ̃ fɔ.mɔ̃ de fil |]
[pu lə pe.ji e pu no pɛ.ɣə ‖]

[pu le‿z.a.jø pu la pa.tɣi.jə |]
[o djø de pɣø o djø de pɣø ‖]
[su ta ga.d‿ɛ̃.fi.ni.jə |]
[pɣã no dɣwa nɔ.tʁə vi.jə ‖]
[o djø de pɣø o djø de pɣø |]
[pu le‿z.a.jø pu la pa.tɣi.jə ‖]
[o djø o djø o djø de pɣø |]
[pu le‿z.a.jø pu la pa.tɣi.jə ‖]

[pu lə dɣa.po pu la pa.tɣi.jə |]
[mu.ɣi ɛ bo mu.ɣi ɛ bo ‖]
[nɔ.tʁə pa.se nu kɣi.jə |]
[ɛ.je la.m‿a.gɛ.ɣi.jə ‖]
[mu.ɣi ɛ bo mu.ɣi ɛ bo |]
[pu lə dɣa.po pu la pa.tɣi.jə ‖]
[mu.ɣi mu.ɣi mu.ɣi ɛ bo |]
[pu lə dɣa.po pu la pa.tɣi.jə ‖]

Literal translation

For the Country, for the Ancestors,
Let us march united, let us march united.
Let there be no traitors in our ranks!
Let us be the only masters of our soil.
Let us march united, let us march united
For the Country, for the Ancestors,
Let us march, let us march, let us march united,
For the Country, for the Ancestors…

For the Forefathers, for the Fatherland
Let us toil joyous, let us toil joyous.
When the field fructifieth
The soul fortifieth
Let us toil joyous, let us toil joyous
For the Forefathers, for the Fatherland
Let us toil, let us toil, let us toil joyous
For the Forefathers, for the Fatherland.

For the Country and for our Fathers
Let us train Sons, let us train Sons
Free, strong and prosperous
We shall always be brothers
Let us train Sons, Let us train Sons
For the Country and for our Fathers
Let us train, let us train, let us train Sons
For the Country and for our Fathers.

For the Forefathers, for the Fatherland
O Lord of the Valiant, O Lord of the Valiant!
Under Thine infinite protection
Take our rights, our life
O Lord of the Valiant, O Lord of the Valiant!
For the Forefathers, for the Fatherland
O Lord, O Lord, O Lord of the Valiant
For the Forefathers, for the Fatherland.

For the Flag, for the Fatherland
To die is beautiful, to die is beautiful!
Our past crieth out to us:
Have a hardened soul!
To die is beautiful, to die is beautiful
For the Flag, for the Fatherland
To die, to die, to die is beautiful
For the Flag, for the Fatherland.

=== Unofficial lyrics ===
A Haitian Creole version (Desalinyèn) was created by Raymond A. Moyse, and Haitian singer Ansy Dérose (1934–1998) helped popularize it in 1980.

Haitian Creole original

Pou Ayiti peyi Zansèt yo
Se pou n (Note: (pou nou)) mache men nan lamen
Nan mitan n (Note: (mitan nou)) pa fèt pou gen trèt
Nou fèt pou n sèl mèt tèt nou.
Annou mache men nan lamen
Pou Ayiti ka vin pi bèl
Annou, annou, met tèt ansanm
Pou Ayiti onon tout Zansèt yo.

Pou Ayiti onon Zansèt yo
Se pou n sekle se pou n plante
Se nan tè tout fòs nou chita
Se li k ba nou manje
Ann bite tè, ann voye wou
Ak kè kontan, fòk tè a bay
Sekle, wouze, fanm tankou gason
Pou n (Note: (Pou nou)) rive viv ak sèl fòs ponyèt nou.

Pou Ayiti ak pou Zansèt yo
Fò nou kapab vanyan gason
Moun pa fèt pou ret avèk moun
Se sa k fè tout Manman ak tout Papa
Dwe pou voye Timoun lekòl
Pou yo aprann, pou yo konnen
Sa Tousen, Desalin, Kristòf, Petyon
Te fè pou wet Ayisyen anba kòd (Note: Sometimes written bòt ('boot').) blan.

Pou Ayiti onon Zansèt yo
Ann leve tèt nou gad anlè
Pou tout moun mande Granmèt la
Pou l (Note: (Pou li)) ba nou pwoteksyon
Pou move zanj pa detounen n
Pou n ka mache nan bon chimen
Pou libète ka libète
Fòk lajistis blayi sou peyi a!

Nou gen drapo tankou tout pèp
Se pou n renmen l (Note: (renmen li)) mouri pou li
Se pa kado blan te fè nou
Se san Zansèt nou yo ki te koule
Pou nou kenbe drapo nou wo
Se pou n travay met tèt ansanm.
Pou lòt peyi ka respekte l (Note: (respekte li))
Drapo sila a se nanm tout Ayisyen.

IPA transcription (Note: See Help:IPA/Haitian Creole and Haitian Creole § Orthography.)

[pu a.ji.ti pe.ji zã.sɛt jo]
[se pun ma.ʃe mɛ̃ nã la.mɛ̃]
[nã mi.tãn pa fɛt pu gɛ̃ tɣɛt]
[nu fɛt pun sɛl mɛt tɛt nu]
[ã.nu ma.ʃe mɛ̃ nã la.mɛ̃]
[pu a.ji.ti ka vin pi bɛl]
[ã.nu ã.nu met tɛt ã.sãm]
[pu a.ji.ti o.nɔ̃ tut zã.sɛt jo]

[pu a.ji.ti o.nɔ̃ zã.sɛt jo]
[se pun se.kle se pun plã.te]
[se nã tɛ tut fɔs nu ʃi.ta]
[se lik ba nu mã.ʒe]
[ãn bi.te tɛ ãn vo.je wu]
[ak kɛ kɔ̃.tã fɔk tɛ a baj]
[se.kle wu.ze fãm tã.ku ga.sɔ̃]
[pun ɣi.ve viv ak sɛl fɔs pɔ̃.jɛt nu]

[pu a.ji.ti ak pu zã.sɛt jo]
[fo nu ka.pab vã.jã ga.sɔ̃]
[mun pa fɛt pu ɣet a.vɛk mun]
[se sak fɛ tut mã.mã ak tut pa.pa]
[dwe pu vo.je ti.mũ le.kɔl]
[pu jo a.pɣãn pu jo kɔ̃.nɛ̃]
[sa tu.sɛ̃ de.sa.lin kɣis.tɔf pe.tjɔ̃]
[te fɛ pu wet a.ji.sjɛ̃ ã.ba kɔd blã]

[pu a.ji.ti o.nɔ̃ zã.sɛt jo]
[ãn le.ve tɛt nu gad ã.lɛ]
[pu tut mun mã.de gɣã.mɛt la]
[pul ba nu pwo.tek.sjɔ̃]
[pu mo.ve zãʒ pa de.tu.nɛ̃n]
[pun ka ma.ʃe nã bɔ̃ ʃi.mɛ̃]
[pu li.bɛ.te ka li.bɛ.te]
[fɔk la.ʒis.tis bla.ji su pe.ji a]

[nu gɛ̃ dɣa.po tã.ku tut pɛp]
[se pun rɛ̃.mɛ̃l mu.ɣi pu li]
[se pa ka.do blã te fɛ nu]
[se sã zã.sɛt nu jo ki te ku.le]
[pu nu kɛ̃.be dɣa.po nu wo]
[se pun tɣa.vaj met tɛt ã.sãm]
[pu lɔt pe.ji ka ɣes.pek.tel]
[dɣa.po si.la a se nãm tut a.ji.sjɛ̃]

Literal translation

For Haiti, the Country of the Ancestors
we must walk hand in hand
There must not be traitors among us –
We alone must be our master
Let us walk hand in hand
that Haiti may be more beautiful
Let us put our heads together
for Haiti on behalf of all the ancestors

For Haiti on the behalf of the Ancestors
Let us mow, let us sow.
All our strength rests in the soil –
It is what feeds us.
Let us mound up earth, let us send water
With joy, the earth must be fertile
Mow, water, women and men
that we may live by our own arms' strength alone.

For Haiti and for the Ancestors
We must be courageous, capable men.
People are not born to serve others
That is why all mothers and fathers
Need to send children to school,
For them to learn, for them to know
what Toussaint, Dessalines, Christophe, Pétion
did to take Haitians from under the whites' rope.

For Haiti on the behalf of the Ancestors
Let us raise our head and look above.
Let everyone to ask the Lord
to grant us protection
that the evil angels may not divert us,
that we may walk in the right path.
For liberty to be able to liberate,
justice must spread over the country!

We have a flag like all peoples.
Let us love it, die for it.
It was not a gift from the whites –
It was our Ancestors' blood that was shed.
Let us hold our flag high.
Let us work together and focus
that other countries may respect it
This flag is the soul of every Haitian.

== See also ==
- Flag of Haiti
- "Haïti Chérie"
- Music of Haiti
- "Quand nos Aïeux brisèrent leurs entraves"
