= Dance in Haiti =

- Haitian Creole: Dans Ayisyen
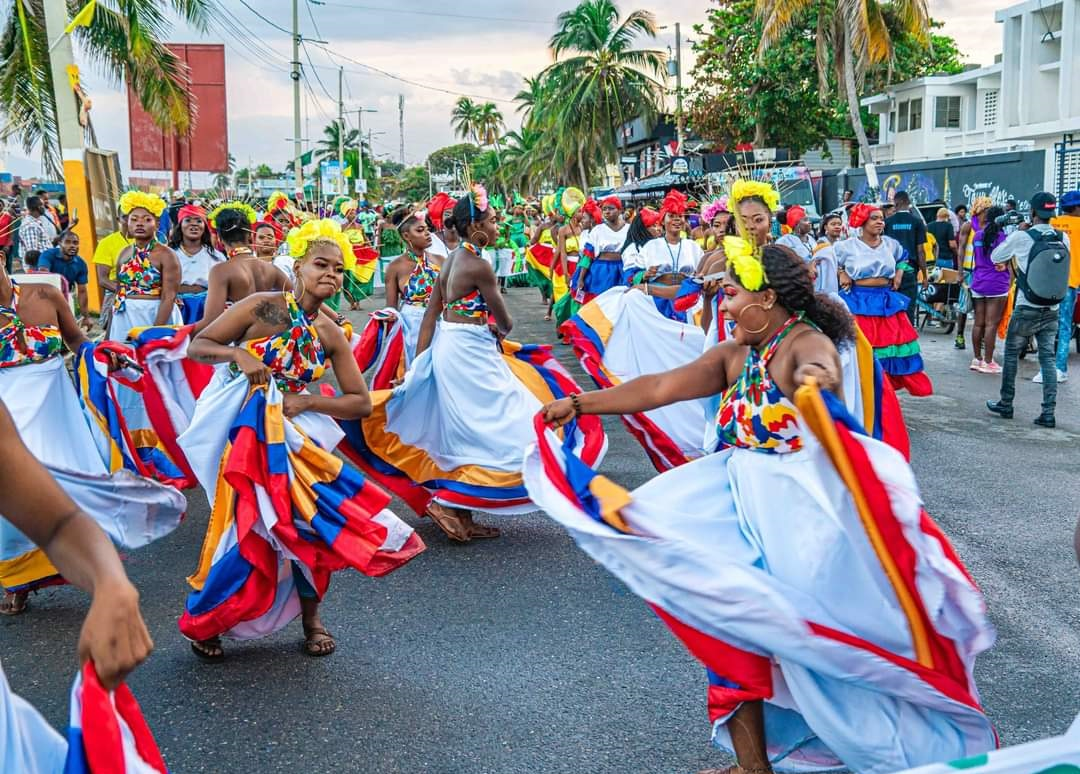

Primary influences
- African Dance – Haitian Vodou drumming – European dances - Taino instruments

Native Haitian styles
- Studio: Twoubadou – Kontradans – Konpa – Méringue

Derivative styles
- Street: Rara – Karnival – rap kreyòl – Rasin – Rabòday
- Vodou Folklore Dances: Rada – Mahi – Zèpòl – Ibo – Dahomey – Petwo-Kongo – Guede
- Contemporary Dance: Ballet

Cultural Markers
- Origins: Africanisms – Haitian music – Culture of Haiti - Haitian Vodou
- Attributes: Haitian Vodou Folk Movements – Kombit Dance Troupes – Social Dance - Polyrythyms - Improvisation - Expressive Full-body movements - Call and response

External videos
- Dances, chants and drum rhythms of Haiti with Jean Léon Destiné via NYPL 2004

The Dance of Haiti (Haitian Creole: Dans Ayisyen French: Danse haïtienne), also known as Haitian Dance, is a collection of performing art of the Haitian people's culture. They pull from roots and a mix of African traditions, Arawak/Taino, European and distinct local origins in Haitian Society.

== History ==
The history of Haitian Dance is as a reflection of the attitudes to the society from 1501 to the present. Dances like Mereng/Méringue were created from creolisation or hybridisation of the movements of the influences. It demonstrated how dance in Haiti served as a means of expressing religious beliefs, social interactions, and even resistance against oppression.
A Haitian proverb is "Apre Dans, Tanbou Lou" which means "After dance, drums are heavy."

Apre Dans, Tanbou Lou

"Haitians say this proverb when someone hosted a party and has to clean alone after, while others helped him/her set it up. Or when someone has to assume alone the consequences after a collective action. This teaches us that there are consequences for any of our actions and most of the time, we have to face them alone even though we were not alone in them."

— Vorb Charles, Haiti Awake

It shows the purpose of dance in everyday life as a means to uplift despite realities in the Haitian viewpoint.

=== Santo Domingo/Saint-Domingue (1501–1804) ===
==== Catholic crusades against Vodou ====
The orthodoxy of Catholic Church leaders such as Bishop François Marie Kersuzan in his 1896 crusade against Haiti's "despicable African paganism," Even though Rara stems roots founded on Afro-Catholic traditions. Dance troupe members were labeled as practitioners of black magic.

=== Independent Haiti (1804–1915) ===
The Acte de l'Indépendance freed Haiti from colonial rule. After the revolution, dances were used to celebrate the victory and express the newly found freedom. Haitians actively used and adapted elements of the former colonizer's culture for their own purposes, ultimately contributing to a unique and vibrant Haitian identity as a "spoils of war". Haitians explored every facet of the arts.

=== The US occupations and Neo-colonization (1915–1934) ===
The US occupation introduced American genres of music to Haiti, such as Jazz, Rock, and American ballroom dancing. During that time, implementation a broader policy of martial law, censorship of the press, and general suppression of dissent in the resistance to the occupation.

==== Négritude Movement ====
A political and cultural awakening known as the Négritude Movement emerged in the 1930s among French-speaking African and Caribbean writers and intellectuals. It challenged French colonial rule and US occupational slavery by affirming Black indigenous identity. It spread as an ethnocentric movement with the arrival of artists from all over the world. Its roots come from the writings and collaborations of such Haitians as Anténor Firmin and Benito Sylvain with others like The Harlem Renaissance's writers. In a movement that encompassed a philosophy of Noirism, etc.

During this period, people like Katherine Dunham's legacy and work were in documenting Haitian Dance and bringing it to mainstream attention. The dances were also documented by Zora Neale Hurston's work in Tell My Horse (1938). At the End of the occupation, "Haiti attracted a sizable number of American folklorists and anthropologists, including Melville and Frances Herskovits, Harold Courlander, Alan Lomax..., and George E. Simpson."

=== Duvalier dictatorships of 1957-1986 ===
François Duvalier's efforts to promote national pride and cultural identity birthed celebrations and institutions in Haiti.

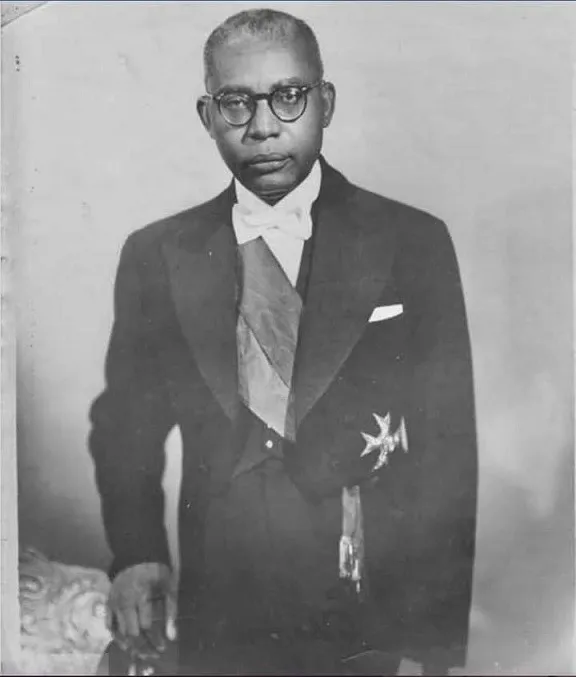
François Duvalier Presidential Portrait (1957)

- Koudyay

Festivals and celebrations sponsored by the Dictator "Papa Doc" Duvalier as literal distractions to quell public dissent.

- Carnaval des Fleurs

Carnaval des Fleurs is an annual summer festival held in Port-au-Prince, Haiti. Its purpose is to highlight Haiti's flora in promoting Tourism. Restarted by Michel Martelly in 2012.

=== Modern Haiti ===
==== 2010 Haiti earthquake ====
On January 12, 2010, up to 300,000 people were killed when a magnitude 7.0 earthquake hits the capital Port-au-Prince and its wider region. The 2010 earthquake was Haiti's worst in 200 years. Many institutions and infrastructure were destroyed or damaged, heavily impacting the culture of Haiti.

== European and inspired dances ==
Merengue Haitian in Havana 2012

=== Haitian national dance: Méringue ===
Méringue (French pronunciation: [meʁɛ̃ɡ]; Haitian Creole: mereng) is the symbol of Haiti and its national dance. It's the mixage of many Haitian elements:

- such as the Karabiyen dance,
- the Kongo drum beat,
- the Kongo vodou dance, etc.
  It expresses Haitian culture, including two versions for both the elite and the proletariat. Unlike the accordion-driven Dominican merengue, Haitian méringue is primarily string-based with a slower, more nostalgic sound, played by an orchestra with a guitar, banjo, saxophone, trap drums & Congo drums.

=== Twoubadou ===
Primarily recognized as a popular genre of guitar-based music, Twoubadou pulls from a combination of Méringue and Cuban guajiro.

- Twoubadou Kreyòl Dance Contests

=== Kontradans aka Kwaze Lewit (8) ===
Kontradans, also known as Kwaze Le 8 or a croisez les huit, evolved from the European Contra dance. In the dance, "Four couples perform the main figures (8),... where they exchange places and move in Entrechat" without touching in a fast pace and tempo. "In both urban and rural areas, the dance became a form of communal bonding, where people from various backgrounds could come together in a shared space."

=== Tumba Francesca ===
Tumba francesais line and square dances named after the freed mulattos.Tumba francesa combines musical traditions of West African, Bantu, French and Spanish origin. The word "tumba" derives from the Congo and Mandinka words for drum.

=== European dances ===
- Troubadour
- Lancers
- Contra dance
- Waltz
- Maypole
- Carré de Campagne
- Polka
- Quadrille
- Affranchi
- Minuet

== Haitian Folk Dance and tribal dance forms ==
=== Kombit dance troupes ===
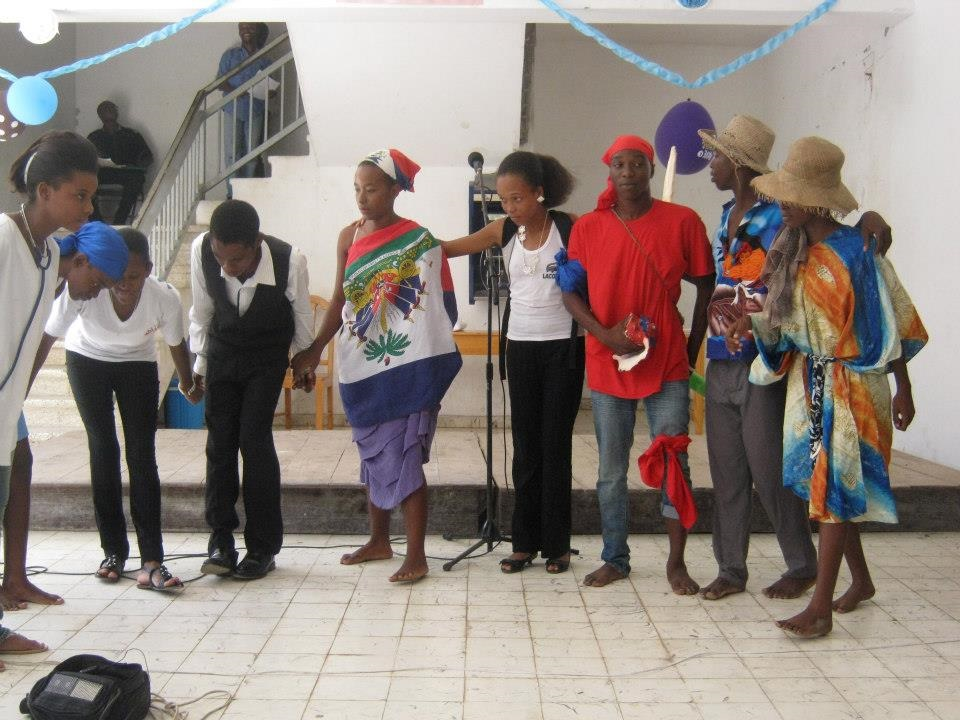
Marabou de MOLICAJ Dance Troupe

Kombit, also known as Danse Konbit, are Dance troupes that developed from Kombit cooperative culture, similar to a collective. They perform at all facets of events and festivals of society, notably in Rara celebrations historically. Music (drums, chants, conch shell trumpet) is used to set a synchronized rhythm to drive the work and sustain the workers' energy and morale.

=== Battle dances ===
- Karabiyen

Karabiyen dances were created after claiming victory in the Revolutionary War of 1804, and named after the soldiers of the Carabiniers rifle regiments in the Haitian army. The dance style is choreographed into couples dance.

- Battonie

The stick dance of the Haitian carnival

- Mousondi

A battle dance that originates from Congo

- Kalenda

Also known as Calinda, Kalenda was a wartime dance from the Origin of Congo and Dahomey derived from the Haitian machete arts namedTire Machèt

- Bamboula

A bamboula is a West African-derived rhythm, dance, and percussion instrument or type of drum made from a rum barrel with skin stretched over one end. It is also a dance accompanied by music from these drums.

In reference to the rhythm, the particular drum on which it is played, and its associated dance....The term "bamboula" or "bambula" is in Kikongo language, meaning to remember.

== Vodou folklore dances ==
Vodou Dances are ritualistic folklore dances that provide energy, timing, coordinated movements, rhythmic footwork, vibrant costumes, and incorporation of live drumming and singing in the Haitian cultural tradition from the origin of African Dance.

Musical instruments

Dances are lead in the polyrhythm of the Haitian Vodou Drums. Haitian ritual music are the drums, the rattles, the bells, etc. The dances are named after the instruments used and the tribes of origin.

=== Rada rite ===
Rada rites dances are slow, undulating, snake-like body movements. The tone is calm, fluid, and orderly. Rada represents a large family of rhythms, dances and songs from the Dahomey region (Arada(Allada), Fon, Mahi, Ewe, and Yoruba) nations that manifest in Haiti's north provinces. The beat utilizes a Rada drum.

Mahi
- Demonstration of traditional Haitian Yanvalou
- Demonstration of traditional Haitian Mahi

- Mahi is the dance described as a fast-paced, three-step pattern dance with agricultural influences, suggesting movements connected to farming. There is also an accompanying song by the same name. Originated from the tradition of Konbit mutual groups, it is also an offering ritual. Its roots are of the Mahi peoples of modern-day Benin.
- Yanvalou is a voodoo dance of Dahomean (present-day Benin) origin that takes many forms of expression in Haitian dance from the Rada rites. Its movements are similar to Tiv people's Swangeand Ewe Agbadza dances.
- Nago dance is a voodoo dance of Rada/Kongo-Petwo rites. The name Nago is also used to describe Africans in Brazil, Louisiana, and the British West Indian colonies of Yoruba origin.
- Djouba (Juba)/ Matinik dances are folklore dances performed in Haitian form of communal farming and mutual aid.
- Zèpòl or (Zépaule Dance) formed from (French: épaule) meaning shoulders. It is characterized by fast, back-and-forth shoulder movements. Originated from the spirits tradition of the Fon religion. Similar to the "agbekor" dance of the Ewe peoples

=== Dahomey rite ===
"Dahomey is a family of Haitian rhythms, dances, and songs linked to the northern Haitian provinces of Gonaïves, Souvenance, and Badjo.."

- Wandjalé
- Chasè
- Akbadja
- Agoni

=== Ibo rite ===
Ibo (Igbo) is a dance that expresses freedom, pride,rage, and resentment against the tyranny of the slave masters. Ibo represents a large family of rhythms, dances and songs from the Igbo nation in Haiti.

Ibo (Igbo)
- Demonstration of traditional Haitian Ibo

=== Petwo rite ===
Petro or Petro Rites is a voodoo dance from Yoruba origin. Their movements are described as fiery and aggressive. Petro represents a large family of rhythms, dances and songs from the Kongo/Angola nation that manifest in Haiti's central and southern regions. The sound of the beat utilizes Petro drums and rhythms.

Petwo
- Demonstration of traditional Haitian Petro

- Bumba or Boumba is a hips focused dance at a slower pace including a trembling of the torso.
- Kita is executed at an extremely volatile and rapid paced Bumba dance. Archaically spelled Quitta. "Kita rhythm" is two goat-skin drums, the Ralé and Manman, played only by hand.
- Danse Quitta
  - Quitta Mouille (wet Quitta)
  - Quitta Schèch (dry Quitta).
Legend of Bwa Kayiman

Also known as "Bwa Kay Iman" or French: Lezanj Dans Bois Caïman. The historic Ceremony of the Pétro Rite was an event that initiated the Haitian Revolution in August 1791 and commenced a 13+ year rebellion of enslaved and formerly enslaved Africans that ultimately established Haiti/Ayiti as an independent Black Republic in 1804.

=== Kongo rite ===
Congo Paillette
- Demonstration of traditional Haitian Congo Paillette

1. Congo, simple
2. Round Congo
3. Congo Paillette from the Kongo/Angola nation."Paillette" is a French term meaning spangle or sequin, The beat utilizes Kongo drums

==== Semi-separate rites ====
Sourced from Anthropological Notes

- Solongo
- Bambarra
- Moundongue (Cuba as the Moundongos)
- Pastorel
- Mousondi
- Moutchétché

=== Guede rite ===
Gede (Haitian Vodou) or (French: Guédé) is associated with death, fertility, and the ancestors. Stemmed from the Ghede people from the plateau of Abomey Mostly celebrated on Fèt Gede is celebrated on All Souls' Day ("Festival of the Dead") on November 2.

- Banda is a Gede dance, involving sexual-styled movements. It is a boisterous fertility dance with strong pelvic movements, smooth footwork, and hip movements. From a generic mixed origin of African dances. It is also a Tanbou drum cadence and rhythm.
- Yanvalou Gede is a slower version of the Banda rhythm. Used before progressing to the customary, faster Banda. This is a Gede-specific version of the Rada, Yanvalou dance.
- Maskawon is often referred to as a dance for the Gede. It has the movements of the yanvalou with higher energy and seductive energy.

=== Other rites ===
- Makaya are folklore dances performed in their own rite, believed to be a blend of Amerindian/Taíno traditions and West-African Bo.
  - Makaya racine kanga is a special version
- Vodou Simbi Dance
- Coumbite (Kombit) dances - folklore dances performed in Haitian form of communal fieldwork and inside different rites as harvest song.
- Bizango
- YaYa TiKongo

== Modern dance ==
=== Kompa ===
Kompa, also known as Spanish: Compás or Haitian Creole: Konpa is the progression of Merengue. Its creation is from the 1950s, by Nemours Jean-Baptiste. This genre combined elements of merengue, jazz, and Cuban music, utilizing a mix of electric guitar, vocals, horns, and drums. It has an evolving sound and dance. It is mostly danced in pairs but can be enjoyed alone in a solo dance. A close and expressive dance that still represents the ballroom elements of Méringue. Kompa quickly gained popularity and became Haiti's signature sound.

A new style of Méringue dance music...The kompa is a form of music and dance that represents an important part of Haiti's cultural heritage,... During the period 1958-1960, a great Haitian musician, Nemours Jean Baptiste, popularised it (with his Ensemble Aux Callebasses) and the kompa diversified with all its variants throughout the regions of Haiti and even in the diaspora. Thus, each dance music group has its own kompa. This music is therefore a symbol of social cohesion and an intrinsic element of Haiti's cultural life, and some of its varieties include the live performances of Hounsi, Melasses, Cadence Rampas or Makyavel."

— Guy G. Lamothe, head of the Haitian diplomatic mission in Madrid (Spain)

==== Modern Kompa ====
Modern Kompa incorporates popular mainstream African Diaspora music on whole, such as Afrobeat, Rap, R&B, Hip-Hop, Rumba, Trap influences etc.
This has given elements of the dance style their own sub-genres, namely:

  - The méringue ballroom form,
  - The Gouye as the action and Gouyad as the style.,
  - Ploge,
  - Footwork or stylized steps,
  - The solo two-step,
  - The Carré or Kare (square dance), a two-step dance from kompa direk,
  - Lead and follow in gendered roles

Fusions from the neighboring islands and beyond in the 90s resulted in:

- Coladeira from Cape Verde, which incorporated the sound of Kompa into the genre around the 1980s
- Zouk or zouk-love, two genres that have incorporated and influenced Kompa. With the origin from Guadeloupe, it was made popular by the world famous Kassav band
- Kizomba
- Semba

=== Mini-jazz ===
Mini-jazz evolved from the Haitian rock played by the yeye bands in the 1960s, the import carried from the US invasion and occupation of the 1910s. The continuation of this is the PAPJAZZ events or the Port-au-Prince International Jazz Festival. Rock Kreyòl is also a continuation of this today.

=== Haitian hip hop (rap kreyòl) ===
In the 1990s, Haitian hip hop influenced and was influenced by Kompa Zouk music. Hip Hop Creole emerges and gains popularity. The 2010s brought Afrobeat and Trap influences.

== Festival music ==
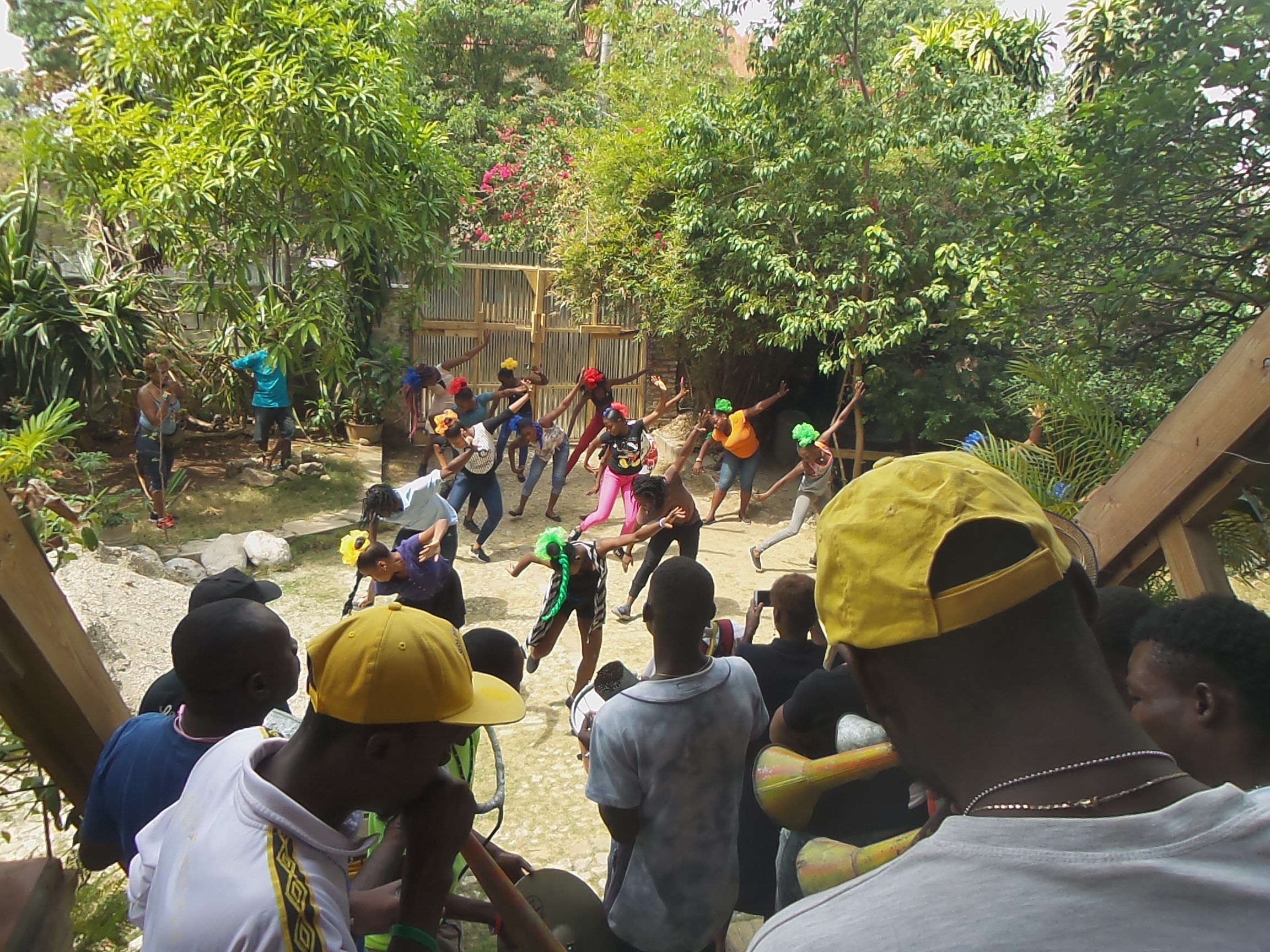
Rehearsal of a choreography at CEDVIG for the Haitian carnival 2020

=== Charyopye ===
Charyopye drumming style is a type of Haitian rhythm. shared in festival music. It means "foot-stomping" in Haitian Kreyol. It is a type of footwork that follows the beat of this cadence.

=== Rara ===
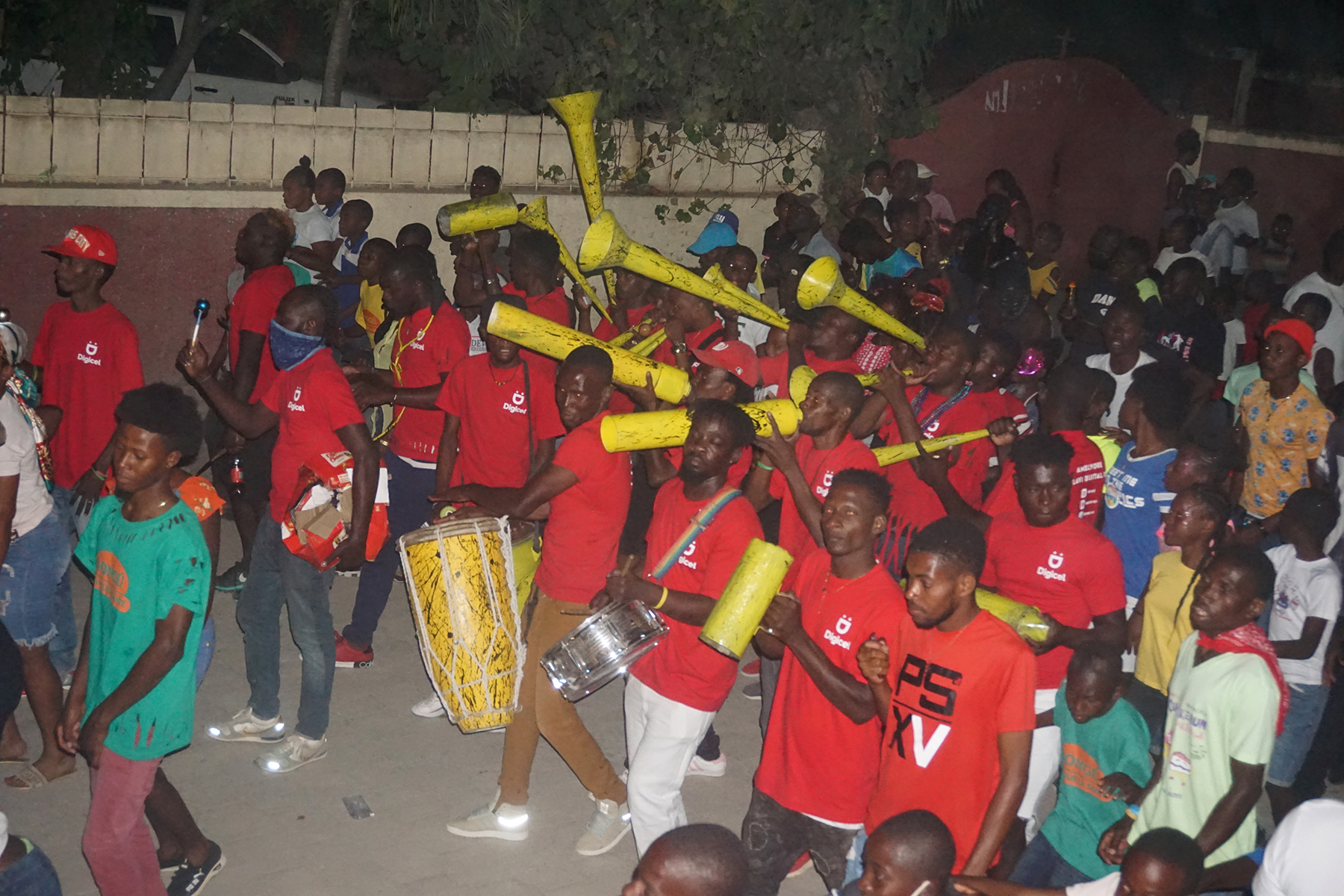
Rara Lakay

Rara in Haiti is celebrated to commemorate part of the slave revolution that led to independence. A unique form of festival music used for street processions that originated in the Catholic religion on the island. Harold Courlander speculated that "the word itself may come from the Yoruba adverb rara, meaning loudly." The lively street music was played with drums, maracas, bells, bamboo trumpets (vaksen), and other instruments.

Rara is the yearly festival in Haiti that the peasants and urban poor celebrate. On the eve of Lent, Rara processions build for six weeks until Easter week starts. Processions include walking for miles through local territory, performing new and traditional songs, and attracting fans. The belief in this celebration is that they are conducting the spiritual work that becomes necessary when the angels and saints along with Jesus, disappear into the Underworld on Good Friday.

Carnaval Port-au-Prince danse

==== Rara Tech ====
Rara tech is an electronic music subgenre that fuses the Afro-Haitian genre rara with house music. Haitian-style electronic dance music (EDM) in Haiti is often referred to as "HEDM" (Haitian electronic dance music). The origins of the genre and term was pioneered by Haitian artist, music producer, and DJ, Gardy Girault.

=== Rasin ===
Mizik rasin is often referred to as "rasin" or "racine" or "Vodou Rock" (in French). It emerged in Haiti in the 1970s. Dances performed to this music often incorporate movements, rhythms and symbolism from Vodou rituals, Rara and traditional Haitian dances. Fusions of expressive dance to freestyled with elements of reggae, rock, and funk. Boukman Eksperyans and RAM are well-known bands in this genre. RAM started out as a folklore Dance troupe that became a band, described as "Vodou rock and roots" In this genre, rock and political message mix with Haitian style and culture.

=== Rabòday ===
Rabòday was created from Rasin music. Its elements are often combined with live electronic sounds, pop-rock, rap, syncopated rhythms and freestyles. It emerged in the mid-2000s, and forms from the Rara dance rhythms.

- Afro Raboday developed recently from the infusion of modern day African Dances
- Zobeky
- Konda

=== Music festivals ===
Music Festivals of Haiti
Carnaval des Fleurs	Kanaval	Koudyay	Rasin Festival
Jacob's Pillow Dance Festival	Kompa	Kalenda	
Port-au-Prince International Jazz Festival	Rara	Rabòday	Rara an deyò
Haitian Defile Kanaval	Fèt Drapo	Fèt Gede	
Plaine-du-Nord Festival	Fèt Chanpèt	Fèt Patwonal	

== Contemporary dance ==
Many dance companies and institutions focus on preserving and evolving these rich cultural dance forms, which often involve performance elements.

=== Ballet ===
Ballet was developed in France, but exported everywhere. Haiti adopted the art form as a "spoils of war" from the Defeat of France

Jean-Léon Destiné was a highly influential figure who founded Haiti's national ballet. As a member of Katherine Dunham's renowned dance company, Destiné played a significant role in bringing Haitian dance to American stages and was an instructor at the American Dance Festival. In the mid 1980s, he created an "African Haitian Dance" class at San Francisco State University.

- Katherine Dunham Performing "Ballet Creole" (1952) via British Pathé

Katherine Dunham, famous for her Dunham Technique which she developed upon living in Haiti on a travel fellowship in 1935, wrote many books and catalogued the Dances she saw in "Dances of Haiti." She had success for incorporating African American, Caribbean, African, and South American movement styles and themes into her ballets. She helped propel African American and Haitian Dance to a global stage, namely with her influential "Bal Nègre" production.

By studying Afro-Haitian dance and culture, she sought to correct racist misrepresentations of African culture and challenge racist stereotypes.

==== Ballet Milokan ====
A Haitian theatrical dance style that signifies a dance heritage that unites the rich spiritual and cultural tapestry of Haitian Vodou, drawing from a diversity of dance traditions. This ceremonial dance recognizes all the powerful forces that continue to guide devotees across times and spaces.

=== Ballroom dances ===
- Konpa
- Konpa Direk
- Meringue
- Kontradans
- Kwaze le 8
- Kalabiyen
- Meringue
- Twoubadou

==== Choreographical dances ====
- Méringue (Haitian National Dance)
- Karabiyen
- Arawak dance
- Danse Bas-Congo
- Danse Anacoana
- Danse Kombit
- Kanaval Dances
- Danse Haïti Chérie
- Katherine Dunham's "Haitian Storm"
- Jean-Léon Destiné's "Combite" and "The Chosen One"

== Dance education ==
=== Community dance institutions ===
- Destiné Afro-Haitian Dance Company
- National Dance Company (Troupe Nationale D'Haiti)
- Jenny Ecole de Danse
- Viviane Gauthier School of Dance
- Konpa Dance troupes
- Lina Mathon-Blanchet Dance troupes
- Gran Lakou dance troupe
- Konbit Kreyol
- La Troupe Makandal
- Ballet Bacoulou
- Jean Appolon Expressions
- Sosyete Koukouy of Miami, Inc
- Tchaka Dance troupe
- Artcho Danse
- BHDT Konpa Dance Competition

=== Dance institutions ===
- Ballet folklorique du Théâtre national d'Haïti
- Haitian Institute of Folklore and Classic Dance
- Institut de Danse Lynn Williams Rouzier
- Rara Tou Limen Haitian Dance Company
- Théâtre de Verdure
- L'Ecole National des Arts
- Ayikodans Ballet
- Troupe Nationale Folklorique (National Folklore Troupe)

== Professional dancers and choreographers ==
- Jean-Léon Destiné
- Euphémie Daguilh
- Viviane Gauthier
- Jeanne Duval
- Gaspard Louis
- Emerante Morse
- Jean Appolon
- Riva Nyri Précil
- Emmanuel Pierre-Antoine
- Jenny Mézile
- Kettly Noël
- Jeanguy Saintus
- Rachel Tavernier
- André Narcisse
- André Germain
- Louinès Louinis
- Peniel Guerrier
- Nadia Dieudonné

== Geographic spread ==
Geographic Spread
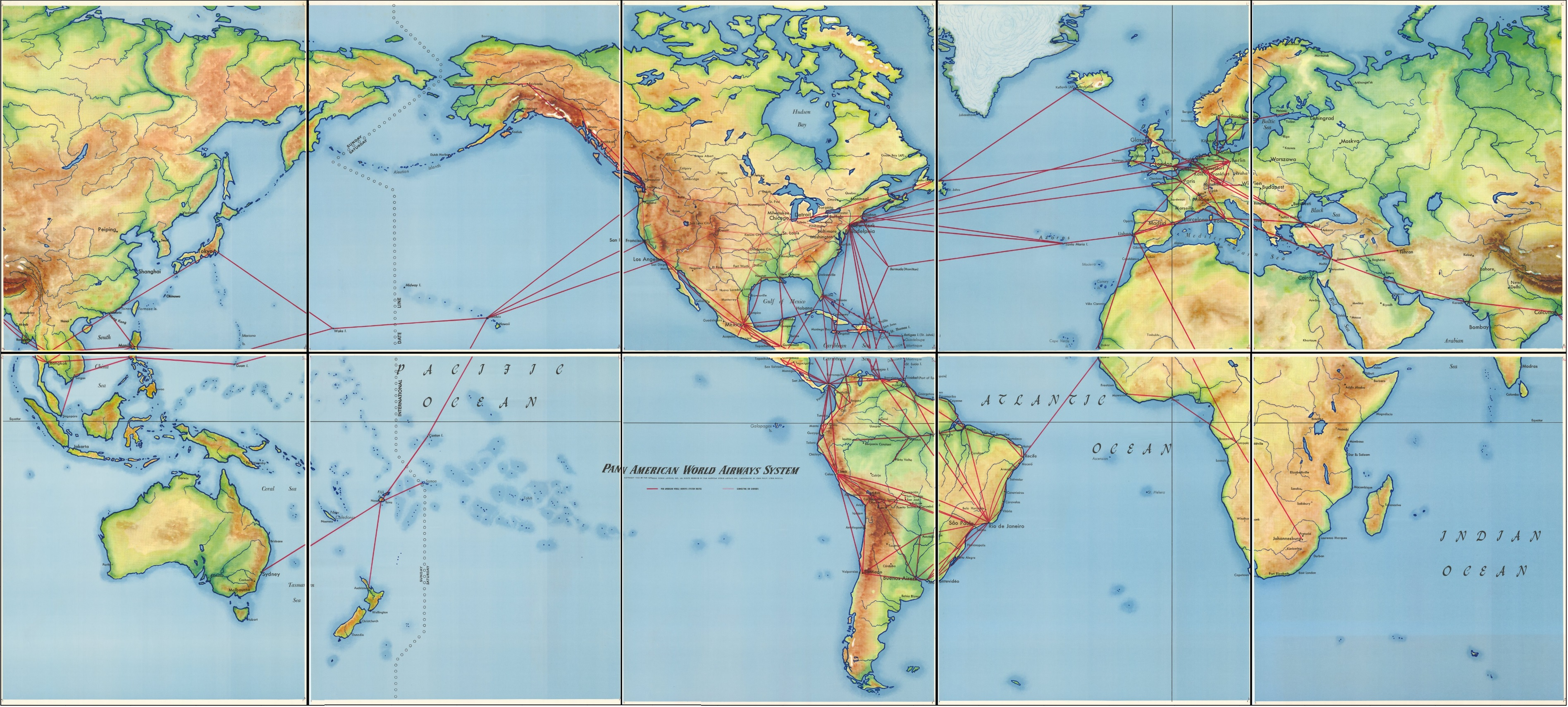
- Pan American World Airways System (Wall Map), 1955

Naturally, several countries that share cultural traits (linguistic, geographical, historical or origin) with Haiti have picked up the culture as one of the best exports of the Pan-Americanism movement. For example, since the 1950s, frequent tours of the many Haitian bands have spread the style of Konpa in all the Caribbean. Beyond that, Haitian artists and people have introduced the world to Haiti's cultural heritage to unite people across the world. The global reach of Haiti's cultural influence has gone beyond the French West Indies to West Africa, Europe, and beyond.

== See also ==
- Haitian music
- Haitian art
- Haitian culture
- Haitian mythology
- Haitian Vodou drumming
- Afro-Caribbean music
- Danzón
