= Lina Mathon-Blanchet =

Haitian musician, ethnographer and arts promoter

- Born: Lina Mathon; 3 January 1903; Port-au-Prince, Haiti
- Died: 11 March 1994 (aged 91); Pétion-Ville, Haiti
- Other names: Lina Blanchet, Mme Jules Blanchet, Mme Arthur Margron, Lina Mathon-Fussman, Lina Fussman-Mathon
- Occupations: music teacher, ethnographer, composer, arts promoter
- Years active: 1921–1994

Lina Mathon-Blanchet (3 January 1903 – 11 March 1994) was a Haitian pianist, music teacher and composer. First director of the Conservatoire National, she was interested in Haiti's folkloric traditions and was one of the first performers to include Vodou-influenced theatrical performances on the public stage in the country. Founding several folkloric troupes, she led her artists on tours throughout the United States and was noted as a teacher and mentor to many prominent Haitian performers. Trained in classical music traditions she collected traditional songs documenting the lyrics, melodies, and rhythms found as traditional themes in Haitian music. She is widely recognized as one of the most influential figures in the development of music in Haiti in the twentieth-century.

== Early life ==
Lina Mathon was born on 3 January 1903 in Port-au-Prince, Haiti to Cléante N. Marie Anne (née Carré) and Charles Mathon. Her father was a physician and her mother raised the couple's five children. From an early age, Mathon was interested in the piano and began formal studies at the age of four with Justin Elie. Between 1917 and 1921, she studied classical music in Paris at the Ecole Notre-Dame de Sion.

== Career ==
Upon returning to Haiti, Mathon began giving piano lessons and on 10 December 1924 married Arthur Margron, with whom she had a son, Reynold (1925–1926). Opening a school, Lycée Musical de Port-au-Prince, Mathon-Margron taught in the tradition of Western classical music, having a particular fondness for Mozart. In the 1920s and 1930s in Haiti, there was a resurgence of interest in indigenism and the folk traditions of the country. Mathon-Margron became fascinated by Vodou and asked a milkmaid to take her to a ceremonial performance. Transcribing the music from the event, she began incorporating it into her students' repertoire. Studying the lyrics, melodies and rhythms of the folk music she encountered at various rural hamlets known as lakous, she began composing music for chamber ensembles, choirs and piano.

Mathon-Margron was one of the first to codify music and dance traditions in Haiti. She collaborated with Werner Jaegerhuber in a project to document local songs prevalent in the culture, but discontent to simply collect songs from peasant women and merchants at the local market, Mathon-Margron visited communities and Vodou temples documenting the music in field expeditions. She also published calls in newspapers encouraging artists who had written original creole songs to contribute to her collection. Her reputation was widespread and she exchanged her research with artists and academics, such as Harold Courlander and Jean Murai.

By the mid-1930s, Mathon-Margron's first husband died. In 1937, she founded the Choeur Folklorique National, an amateur choral group which performed Haitian-themed music. She defied local customs and in 1938, presented a group of students from Ecole Maud Turian, where she taught voice, in a performance of songs in Haitian Creole. This was one of the first times that a performance inspired by Vodou and the country's lingua franca was publicly staged for "polite" society. Between 1939 and 1940 the group performed at charity events and lecture halls, as well as at clubs like the Cercle Bellevue and Cercle Port-au-Princien. Around this time, she married a Polish-Jewish refugee, Max Fussman, who had fled his homeland because of World War II. in the early 1940s, she formed Haïti Chant et Danse, an ensemble which performed Vodou dance as well as music.

In 1941, Mathon-Fussman was selected by Élie Lescot, soon to be president of Haiti to attend the National Folk Festival in Washington, D.C., with fifteen students who called their group the Legba Singers. The selection of her group was controversial because the organizers initially wanted authentic Vodou artists, but cautioned that they should ensure that they must perform "without spirit possession ensuing". As it was impossible to make those assurances, Mathon-Fussman's group was selected to ensure that it was as authentic as possible but could be a controlled performance. It also required her to quickly train the students in dance, as to that point, they had only sung traditional songs. Making an arrangement with a well-respected sèvitè, she took her students for training in a rural area outside Port-au-Prince. At the time, the Catholic Church in Haiti was waging an anti-superstition campaign throughout the country and Mathon-Fussman and her students were arrested, though she was able to secure their release.

The Legba Singers performed at the Pan American conference, the first Haitian group to perform Vodou-inspired song and dance on stage. After their performance, they toured for two weeks at such venues as Constitution Hall, Howard University, and the International House in Washington and performed at Washington Irving High School in New York City, The performance at Constitution Hall marked the first time black performers had played there, as two years previously, the African-American singer, Marian Anderson had been barred by the color barrier. At a reception held at the Carlton Hotel and attended by international diplomats, Mathon-Fussman's group were presented as cultural ambassadors. The gathering marked the first time that Vodou had officially been acknowledged as part of Haiti's cultural heritage, though that acceptance was tempered by a transformation of ritual into stylized choreography.

There was backlash from the community, which began to stigmatize the dance troupe members as practitioners of black magic, as well as fear that "contamination" might occur. The official government response was to endorse the Catholic Church's anti-superstition campaign and promise military and civic enforcement to church officials. However, simultaneously, the state accepted that folkdance removed of its ritual connotation, was a draw for developing tourism. In 1943, Mathon-Fussman and her husband moved to Washington, where she studied at the Catholic University of America. She periodically returned to Washington and New York City, where she studied at the Teachers College, Columbia University, throughout the 1940s and 1950s. Her second husband died in 1947, and by 1952, she had remarried with Jules Blanchet with whom she had a daughter Margaret. Jules was the First Counselor at the Court of Accounts and the family made their home in Pétion-Ville.

Mathon-Blanchet's nephew, Férère Laguerre, a student of hers and a colleague, founded the Choeur Simidor, for which she composed and arranged music. In 1947, she founded and became a co-director of the Troupe Nationale Folklorique (National Folklore Troupe) along with her nephew Laguerre, Micheline Laudun Denis, and Jean-Léon Destiné. The dance troupe was founded as part of the as a vehicle to create traditional dances for the festivities surrounding the Haitian bicentennial. When Paul Magloire became president of Haiti, he named Mathon-Blanchet as the first director of the Conservatoire National. The majority of Mathon-Blanchet's compositions have been lost. A solo piano work, No. II, composed in 1952 featuring a popular folk song and two méringues; a string quartet Contes et Légendes composed and archived at the Catholic University of America; and five arranged folks songs, Kim’ba la, La souce o m’pralé, Mé-mé, Pinga ma hi roulé, and Souflé vent are some of her known scores.

Mathon-Blanchet continued teaching, promoting artists and performing throughout the decades of the 1950s to the 1980s. In 1988, the Orchestre Philharmonique Sainte Trinité, under the direction of Julio Racine, performed her arrangement of Soufle Vent. The following year, she worked as the musical advisor for the Haitian Folk Ballet's productions of Doréus and Tezen. Her last public performance was a recital given in Saint-Pierre de Pétion-Ville Church in 1994.

== Death and legacy ==
Mathon-Blanchet died on 11 March 1994. She is remembered for being one of the most influential Haitian musicians of the twentieth century, influencing generations of Haitian musicians and artists. Her influence had a global impact by introducing African arts and themes to the stage in the 1940s to 1950s, which have become standards in 21st-century modern dance performance. Among her students were: Frisner Augustin, Raymond Baillargau who played under the stage name of Ti Roro, Lumane Casimir, Micheline Laudun Denis, Yole Dérose, Jean-Léon Destiné, Jacky Duroseau, James Germain, Martha Jean-Claude, Emerante Morse and Guy Scott.
