= Brats of the Lost Nebula =

Television series

- Created by: Dan Clark
- Countries of origin: United States; Canada
- Original language: English
- No. of episodes: 13

Production
- Executive producers: Dan Clark; Brian Henson; Margaret Loesch
- Running time: 21 minutes
- Production companies: The Jim Henson Company; Decode Entertainment; Wandering Monkey Entertainment

Original release
- Network: The WB (U.S.); YTV (Canada)
- Release: October 10, 1998 – January 20, 1999

Brats of the Lost Nebula is a science fiction puppet computer-animated television series for kids. The series follows five orphaned children from different war-torn planets. As they search for their surviving family members, they must also band together to fight an evil invading force known as "The Shock".

The series was created by Dan Clark, who was also an executive producer along with Brian Henson and Margaret Loesch. The puppet characters mixed both traditional hand puppetry and animatronics. These puppets were built by Jim Henson's Creature Shop. The computer graphics were created by C.O.R.E. Digital Pictures.

It initially aired on The WB, but was removed from the channel after airing its third episode. The remaining episodes were shown on Canada's YTV channel.

== The Brats ==
The Brats, sometimes referred to as orphans, each have a different set of skills in addition to their otherworldly uniqueness. After the escape of Zadam and Triply from the Shock attack on their home world, the five kids meet on a living planetoid to start their rebellion against The Shock and find their lost parents.

- Zadam (voiced by Kirby Morrow) is a 14-year-old leader of the Brats and Triply's older brother. He is from the planet Shirud.
- Triply (voiced by Annick Obonsawin) is Zadam's 10-year-old little sister. She is also from Shirud and is one of the most feared warriors in the universe.
- Duncan (voiced by Glenn Cross) is a heavy, muscle-bound 13-year-old male with tinkering skills. He is from the planet Yarlon. He is extraordinarily strong and built like most muscle bound creatures but is also good-natured and intelligent.
- Ryle (voiced by Evan Sabba) is a horned, blue-skinned 15-year-old male who is fiercely competitive. He is from the planet Tranoid. He is also quick-tempered, tough and obsessed with sports. He agrees with Zadam being the Leader of the group.
- Lavana (voiced by Deborah Odell) is a 13-year-old winged elf with mystic abilities. She is from the planet Loza. She is a gothic girl who comes from a race of exotic elfin creatures magic users a thinker of and lover of life. Lavana loses her wings four episodes into the series.

They are aided in their quest by a long-eared animal named Splook, who has a missile-laden suit of armor, and by SMARTS, the smartest computer in the universe. The Brats ride themselves into battle on modified space cruisers.

== Episodes ==
No. in season	Title	Directed by	Written by	Original release date
1	"What Mom Said"	Steve Wright	Dan Clark	October 10, 1998
2	"Total Bratification"	Otto Hanus	Lane Raichert	October 18, 1998
3	"Brain Dead"	David Warry Smith	John Derevlany	October 25, 1998
4	"A Lozian Necessity"	David Warry Smith	Michael Mayhew	November 1, 1998
5	"Heart Hunters"	Steve Wright	Rick Drew	December 2, 1998
6	"Punk Chip"	David Warry Smith	Scott Peters	November 12, 1998
7	"The Runaways"	David Straiton	Teleplay by : John Derevalny and Michael Mayhew; Story by : John Derevalny	November 18, 1998
8	"Mutant Freak"	Ross Clyde	Lane Raichert	November 25, 1998
9	"Blite For a Day"	Steve Wright	Michael Mayhew	December 9, 1998
10	"The Acceptors"	Gail Harvey	John Derevlany	December 30, 1998
11	"Faith"	Steve Wright	Michael Mayhew	January 6, 1999
12	"Mom & Dad"	David Straiton	George Melrod	January 13, 1999
13	"Papa's Got a Brand New Bag"	Steve Wright	Dan Clark	January 20, 1999

== Cast ==
=== Puppeteers ===
- Bill Barretta
- Matt Ficner – Mallosha, Zadam
- John Kennedy
- Trish Leeper
- Sue Morrison
- Ian Petrella
- James Rankin
- Gordon Robertson
- Fred C. Stinson
- Jeff Sweeney
- Jean-Guy White
- Mak Wilson

=== Voices ===
- Glenn Cross – Duncan
- Kirby Morrow – Zadam
- Annick Obonsawin – Triply
- Deborah Odell – Lavana
- Evan Sabba – Ryle
- Rob Smith – Blight
- James Rankin – High Commander Vigar

== Broadcast ==
In the United States, the series premiered on the Kids' WB block on October 10, 1998. It was removed from the schedule after airing its third episode on October 24. In Canada, all thirteen episodes aired on YTV from November 1998 onward. The last episode debuted on January 20, 1999.

In 2020, hundreds of hours of Jim Henson Company productions were released on Roku, including Brats of the Lost Nebula.

== Unproduced follow-ups ==
In early 1999, a Playback article reported that "another thirteen [episodes] are on the way", but these new episodes were never produced. In 2002, Kidscreen reported that Dan Clark, in collaboration with The Jim Henson Company, was working on a Brats of the Lost Nebula title intended for direct-to-video release.
