= Jean-Guy =

Jean-Guy is a given name. Notable people with the name include:

== In politics ==
- Jean-Guy Allard (1948–2016), Canadian journalist for Le Journal de Montréal and Le Journal de Québec
- Jean-Guy Cardinal (1925–1979), nationalist politician in Quebec, Canada
- Jean-Guy Carignan (born 1941), member of the Canadian House of Commons from 2000 to 2004
- Jean-Guy Chrétien (born 1946), member of the Canadian House of Commons from 1993 to 2000
- Jean-Guy Dagenais (born 1950), Canadian politician from Quebec
- Jean-Guy Deschamps, former politician in Montreal, Quebec, Canada
- Jean-Guy Dubé, Conservative Party of Canada candidate in the 2008 Canadian federal election
- Jean-Guy Dubois (born 1948), Liberal party member of the Canadian House of Commons
- Jean-Guy Guilbault (1931–2022), member of the House of Commons of Canada
- Jean-Guy Hudon (born 1941), Progressive Conservative member of the Canadian House of Commons
- Jean-Guy Laforest (born 1944), business owner and former political figure in New Brunswick, Canada
- Jean-Guy Péloquin, Abolitionist Party of Canada candidate in 1993 Canadian federal election
- Jean-Guy Sabourin, Parti créditiste candidate in 1973 Quebec provincial election
- Jean-Guy Trépanier, politician in the Quebec, Canada

== In sports ==
- Jean-Guy Brunet (born 1939), Canadian alpine skier and Olympic competitor
- Jean-Guy Gautier (1875–1938), French rugby union player who competed in the 1900 Summer Olympics
- Jean-Guy Gendron (1934–2022), Canadian ice hockey left winger
- Jean-Guy Gratton (born 1949), Canadian ice hockey forward
- Jean-Guy Lagace (born 1945), Canadian ice hockey defenceman
- Jean-Guy Morissette (1937–2011), Canadian ice hockey goaltender
- Jean-Guy Poitras, Canadian badminton referee
- Jean-Guy Talbot (1932–2024), Canadian ice hockey defenceman and coach
- Jean-Guy Trudel (born 1975), Canadian ice hockey left winger
- Jean-Guy Wallemme (born 1967), French footballer

== Other people ==
- Jean-Guy Hamelin (1925–2018), Canadian Roman Catholic bishop
- Jean-Guy Paquet, CC GOQ FRSC (born 1938), Canadian scientist, businessman, and former rector of Université Laval
- Jean-Guy Pilon, OC CQ FRSC (1930–2021), Quebec poet
- Jean-Guy White, Canadian sculptor and puppet designer/builder

== See also ==
- Jean Guy (1922–2013), American First Lady of the U.S. state of North Dakota
