= Frisner Augustin =

Haitian Vodou drummer (1948–2012)

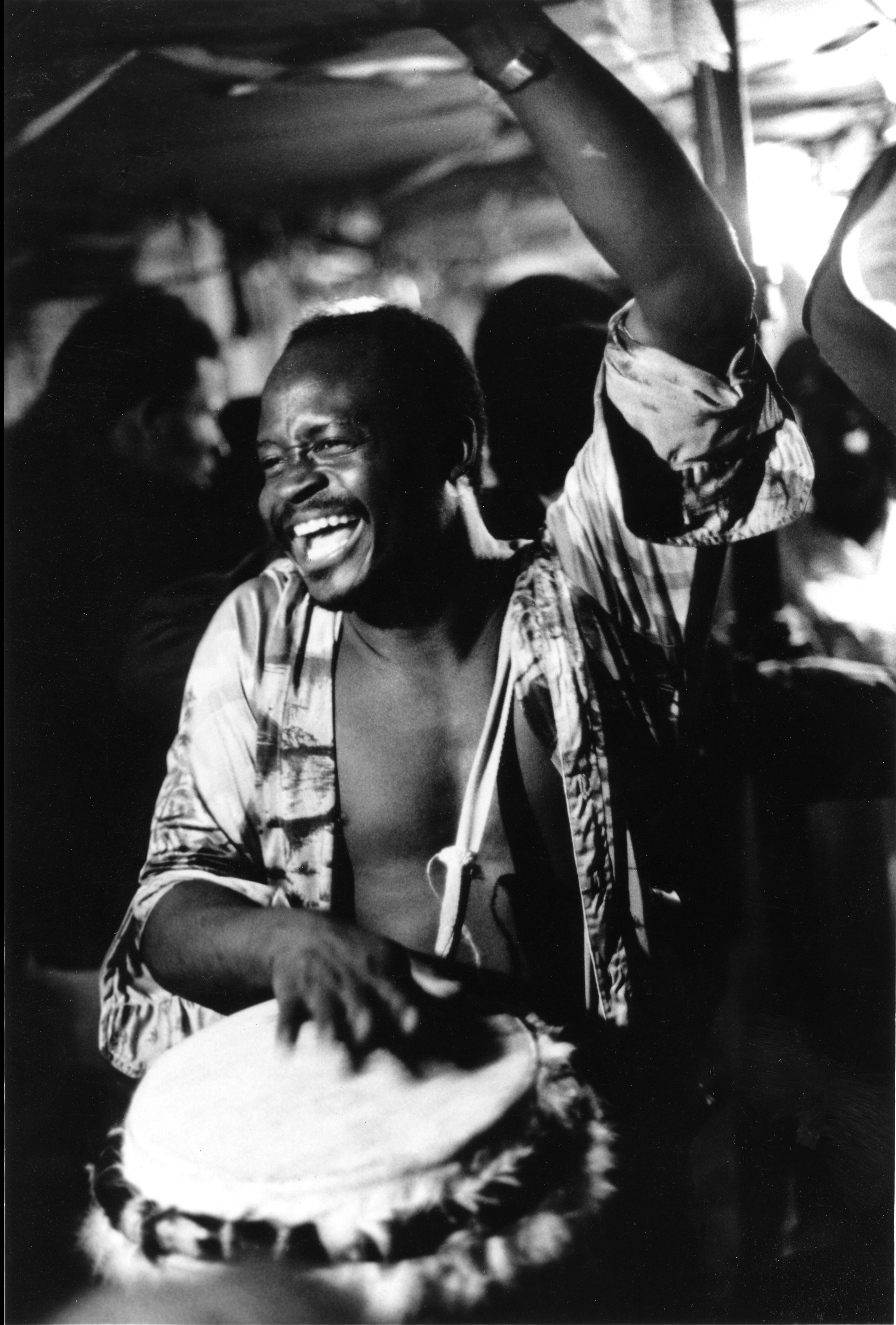
- Augustin at a Vodou dance in Brooklyn, 1980s
- Born: Frisner Augustin; March 1, 1948; Port-au-Prince, Haiti
- Died: February 28, 2012 (aged 63); Port-au-Prince, Haiti
- Other name: Ti Kelep
- Occupations: Musician, Composer
- Known for: Haitian Vodou drumming

Frisner Augustin (Haitian Creole pronunciation: [fɣisnɛ ogistɛ̃]) (March 1, 1948 – February 28, 2012) was a major performer and composer of Haitian Vodou drumming, and the first citizen of Haiti to win a National Heritage Fellowship from the National Endowment for the Arts in the United States, where he resided for forty years.

A youth prodigy on the traditional drums of Haitian Vodou in ritual context, Augustin took his genre to the modern stage, often exploring its common roots with various jazz styles. From his initial forays in Haiti with Lina Mathon-Blanchet, Jacky Duroseau, and Jazz des Jeunes, he went on to work in the United States and Europe with Kip Hanrahan, Edy Brisseaux, and Andrew Cyrille. He also recorded for the late filmmaker Jonathan Demme.

Augustin led his own ensemble, La Troupe Makandal, from 1981 until his death. He used the group not only to make music but also to change popular misconceptions in the public mind regarding Haitian Vodou, a poorly understood but richly developed Afro-Haitian spiritual discipline.

== Early life in Haiti ==
Augustin was born in Port-au-Prince, Haiti, on March 1, 1948. His mother, a poor retailer named Andrea Laguerre, gave birth to Frisner, her first child, under a tree outside the city's General Hospital while waiting for a room that never became available. Andrea took her son to the dirt-floor shack that was their home in the capital's Portail Léogane district, specifically, a community called "behind the cemetery" because of its location along the west side of the major burial ground at the south end of the city. The child's father, a carpenter named Julien Augustin, left their home not long after the birth of his second child, a girl. Growing up without the presence of a father in the home, the boy decided it was up to him to support his mother and sister. Since the family had no means to put him in school, and since his passion was music, he began to follow in the footsteps of his uncle Catelus Laguerre, a drummer in the oral tradition, at the age of seven. He earned the nickname Ti Kelep (Tee Kay-lep), which means "Little Kelep", the second word referring to a pattern unique to the third drum of the Vodou ensemble. By the time Augustin had reached his early teens, the Vodou houses of his community had recognized his genius for drumming, and one house initiated him as its ountògi (oo-taw-gee; sacred drummer).

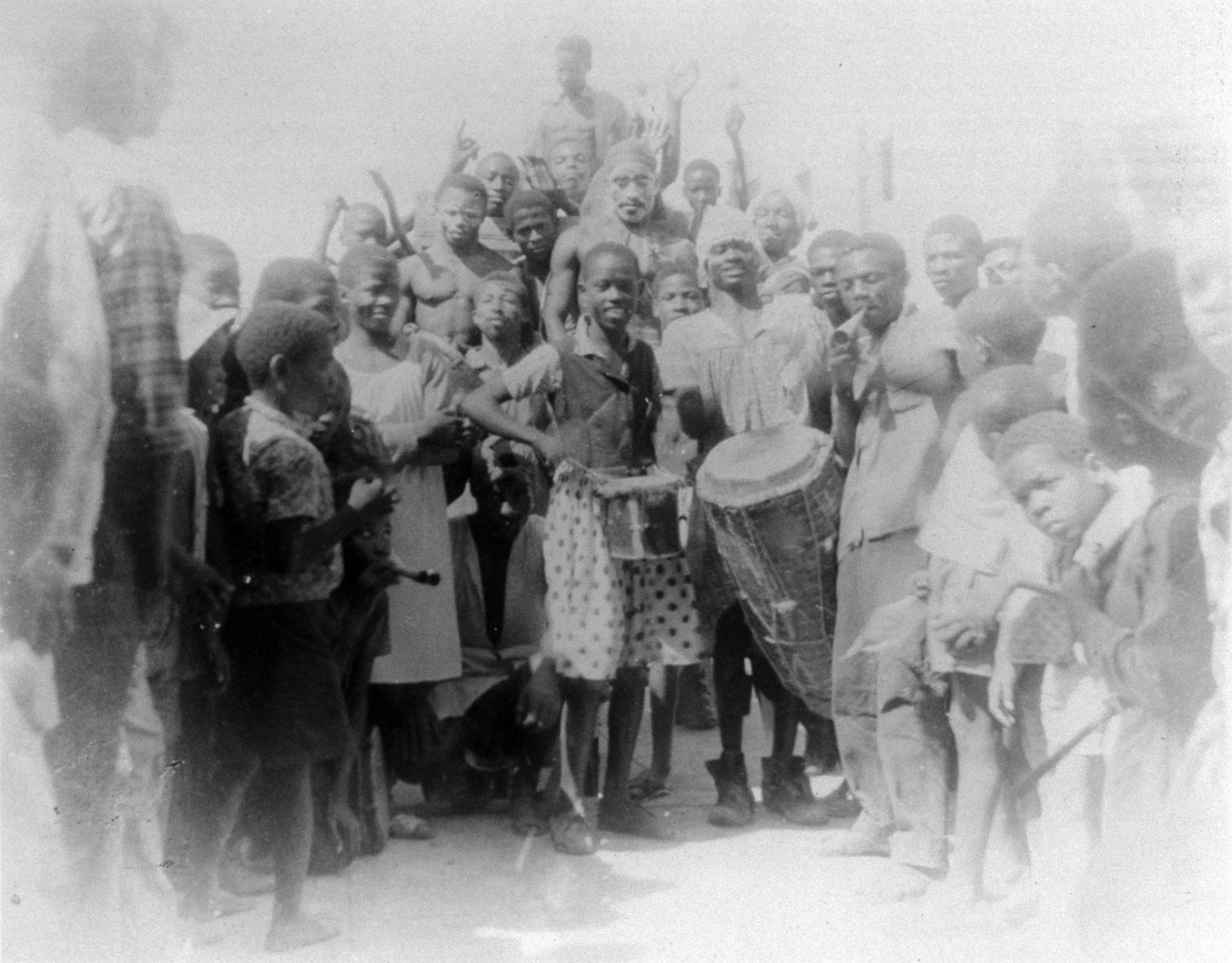
Augustin (center, holding large drum) and his youth Mardi Gras band, Port-au-Prince, early 1960s

Julien Augustin returned to the family and placed his now adolescent son in a welding school at about the same time that André Germain, a director of Haiti's La Troupe Folklorique Nationale (National Dance Troupe), discovered him playing at a Vodou ceremony just outside Port-au-Prince. To his father's consternation, Augustin dropped out of the welding school when Germain introduced him to Lina Mathon Blanchet, a classical pianist who had organized Haiti Chante et Danse (Haiti Sings and Dances), one of the country's first companies performing folklore, a word used in Haiti to denote both traditional culture and a genre that represents traditional culture on the modern stage. Blanchet also taught piano and guided the career of Jacky Duroseau, who went on to develop a unique style of Vodou jazz. Augustin soon found work with a small jazz combo featuring Duroseau, with Haiti Chante et Danse, and later with the folklore companies of African-American dancer Lavinia Williams and Haitian dance professor and choreographer Viviane Gauthier. While continuing to play in Vodou temples and in a Mardi Gras band of his own creation, he entertained tourists in theaters and hotels, inside and outside Haiti.

In 1972, one year into the tenure of dictator Jean-Claude Duvalier, Augustin accepted an engagement in New York with Jazz des Jeunes, the orchestra that accompanied La Troupe Folklorique Nationale. Like all other members of the company, he used the opportunity to emigrate from Haiti and settle in the burgeoning Haitian diaspora of New York City.

== Life and work in the United States and abroad ==
Soon after his emigration to New York City in 1972, Augustin re-connected with childhood friend Oungan Emmanuel Cadet, who had established a Vodou society in the Bronx. In October 1973 Cadet performed a spiritual marriage between Augustin and Èzili Freda Dawomen, a Vodou spirit with roots in West Africa who represents romantic love. Such a marriage, according to Vodou practitioners, brings prosperity to the human partner in exchange for special devotion.

Dancers and choreographers who had played with companies in Port-au-Prince since the 1940s were leaving Haiti during the 1960s and '70s and re-forming in New York. Augustin found work drumming for Jean-Léon Destiné, Louinès Louinis, Troupe Shango of Arnold Elie, and the Ibo Dancers of Paulette St. Lot; however, throughout the 1970s, he aspired to leadership of his own group even though dancers typically led folklore companies. In 1981 La Troupe Makandal, a company established in the Port-au-Prince neighborhood of Upper Belair and named after the eighteenth-century revolutionary and messiah François Makandal, arrived in New York and sought Augustin out for help in establishing itself in the diaspora. He took the group under his wing and introduced it to the Haitian community in a Thanksgiving festival at Brooklyn College. The company immediately and thereafter distinguished itself for its raw authenticity and bold presentation of the sacred gesture. Together with his drumming student, musicologist Lois Wilcken, Augustin established the company as a not-for-profit organization incorporated in New York State.

Directing his own company gave Augustin the opportunity to develop a particular style of Vodou drumming and to train an ensemble in his own manner. He and the company soon attracted the attention of entrepreneurs, particularly with staged representations of Vodou rites that aimed to re-educate the public about Vodou and Haiti itself. Throughout his performing and teaching career, he continued to drum for Vodou houses both in and out of New York. In his own analysis, he placed greatest value on drumming directly for the spirits in a consecrated space.

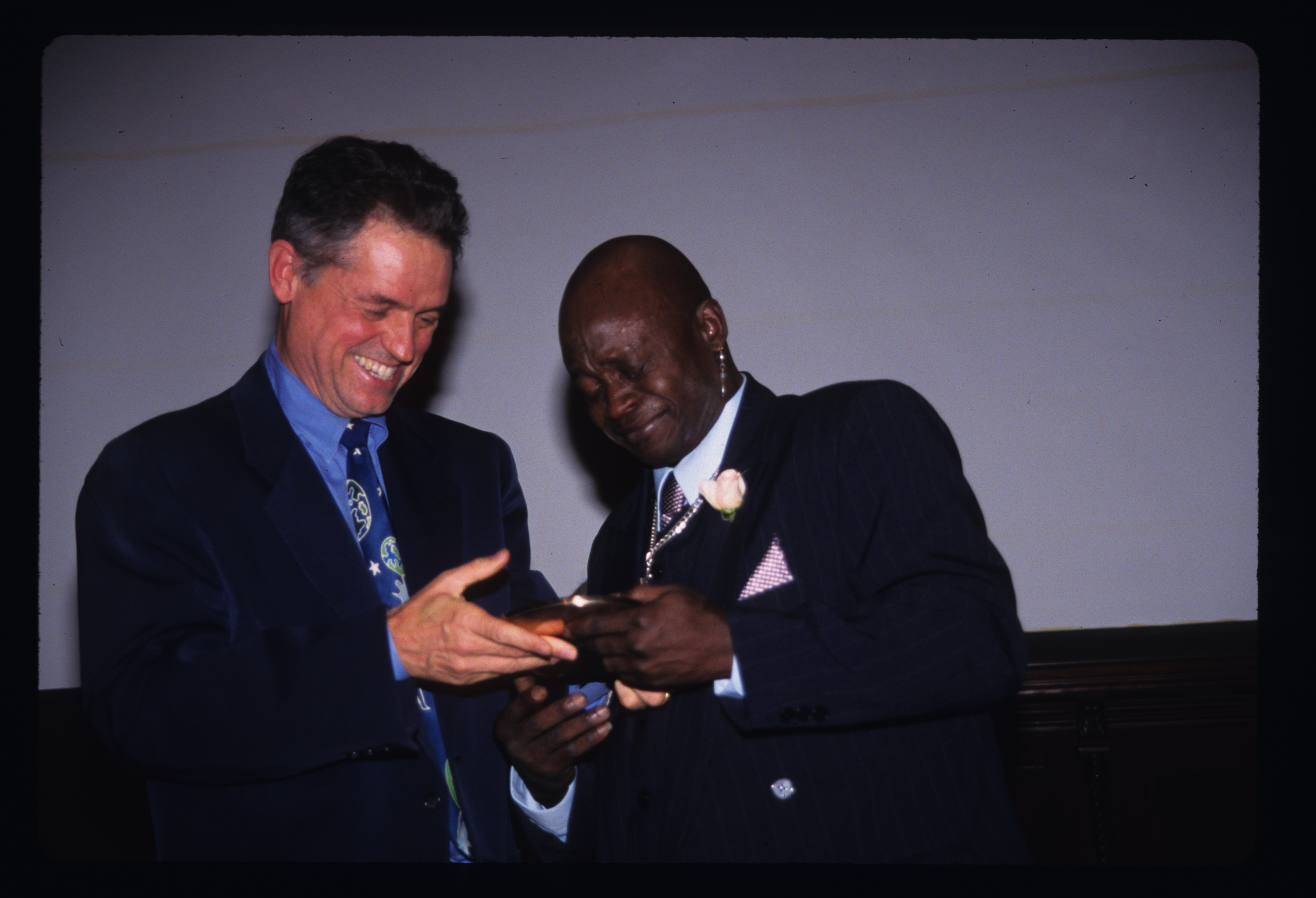
Filmmaker Jonathan Demme presents Augustin with City Lore's People's Hall of Fame Award, New York City, 1998.

Recognition arrived in 1998 when the cultural center City Lore inducted Augustin into its People's Hall of Fame. Filmmaker Jonathan Demme, whose film Beloved included Makandal on its soundtrack, presented the award and dubbed Augustin "the Arnold Schwarzenegger of transcendental music". One year later the National Endowment for the Arts (NEA) awarded him its National Heritage Fellowship, the highest honor the United States confers in folk and traditional arts. He was the first Haitian artist to earn this distinction. A Certificate of Achievement from the National Coalition for Haitian Rights followed on the heels of the NEA award; Tonèl Lakay, a children's troupe, gave him a plaque of honor; and in 2011 dancer/choreographer Peniel Guerrier paid tribute to Augustin with his annual Kriye Bòdè award. Augustin's company, La Troupe Makandal, has received awards from New York's Caribbean Cultural Center and from the Haitian Studies Association.

== Later life ==
Augustin (standing) soundchecking for his last performance at the Institut Français, Port-au-Prince, February 16, 2012

Through frequent visits back home during his residency in New York, Augustin maintained his ties not only to Haiti but also to the community in which he grew up. When the Haiti earthquake of 2010 destroyed much of Port-au-Prince, he and Dr. Wilcken raised funds and brought relief to his neighborhood on YouTube. In the next two years, his company organized a Haitian Carnival for children in the community on YouTube. During his visit in the winter of 2012, he made plans with the École Nationale des Arts (ENARTS) of Port-au-Prince for a drumming course beginning in the fall of 2012. ENARTS also presented him in concert on YouTube at the Institut Français in Port-au-Prince as part of a collaborative series of the two organizations. Augustin met at that time with organizers of the annual International Jazz Festival of Port-au-Prince, and they were considering his participation in the Festival.

During the same 2012 visit to Haiti, on the night of February 23–24, Augustin suffered a massive brain hemorrhage and died in the Bernard Mevs Hospital in Port-au-Prince on February 28. He was buried in the Grand Cemetery in his family mausoleum on YouTube. The night before the funeral a local mambo conducted the traditional Vodou desounen, rites that formally separate the spirit of the dead from the body and send it beneath the cosmic waters. One year and one day later, as per tradition, a Vodou priest near Jacmel, a city in the south of Haiti and the source of Augustin's maternal line, reclaimed his soul and installed it in a place of honor. In June 2012 Makandal, together with Ayiti Fasafas, the Center for Traditional Music and Dance, and the Haiti Cultural Exchange, presented a memorial performance to Augustin in Brooklyn, New York. Other memorial projects in process include an annotated online archive (NEA 2013 Spring Grant Announcements, page 111) of his life and work, a biography, and ongoing performances and workshops that promote his style and aesthetic.

Augustin was married and divorced once. Seven children, five grandchildren, his father, and his sister survived him.

== Musical legacy ==
Augustin and Makandal drumming for a Haitian Vodou dance in Queens, New York, December 5, 2009

Augustin's drumming style featured a refined balance of aesthetic cool and volatile energy. Critic Robert Palmer noted after a performance in Manhattan, "...Augustin embroidered explosive improvisations...over the ensemble's deftly layered rhythmic conversations while always keeping an eye on dancers and singers and guiding the ebb and flow of relaxation and intensity". Dancers recognized him for his intimate terpsichorean exchanges: "He lays luscious melodies like flowers at your feet, almost within reach, then yanks them away just as you are about to grab them". He exploited the full tonal/timbral palette of the drum and often said, "The drum is a piano". Equally accomplished in hand and stick technique (both used in Vodou drumming), he delivered crisp, clear articulations of open and closed mid-range tones, bass tones, portamento glides, rimshots, etc. When a student failed to render the strokes properly, he admonished him or her to "clean it." On the temporal side, Augustin broke new ground with his kase, which tested the limits of how far one can travel from the principal rhythmic framework without losing it: "More so than any traditional drummer, Augustin has the ability to drop out of the rhythm completely...riffing brilliantly in stunning jazz-like improvisations for carefully calculated intervals, then coming back in, skeletally at first, and finally resuming full melody".

Augustin made several recordings, some of which featured his compositions for La Troupe Makandal. A part of the Troupe's online archive of his performances and workshops, public and private lives, and Vodou activities went online in December 2018 as The Frisner Augustin Memorial Archive. The company continues to build the archive as new materials are collected and, when needed, digitized. Hard copy materials are stored at the Haitian Studies Institute (HSI) at Brooklyn College CUNY.

== Works ==
=== With La Troupe Makandal ===
- A Trip to Vodou. 1982. CD. La Troupe Makandal.
- The Drums of Vodou. 1992. CD. Produced by White Cliffs Media Company, distributed by Pathway Book Service.
- Èzili. 1986. CD. La Troupe Makandal.
- Prepare. 2004. CD. La Troupe Makandal.
- The Intimate Touch: From Frisner with Love. 2014. CD. Ountò Music Publishing 1407–ITcd.

=== With others ===
- Ban'm Mizik, Vol. II. 1997. CD. Edy Brisseaux + Bazilik, with Frisner Augustin on selected tracks. Bazilik Productions.
- Beloved. 1998. Original motion picture soundtrack. Featuring Frisner Augustin and La Troupe Makandal on tracks 3 and 19. epic/Sony Music Soundtrax EK 69656.
- Conjure, Music for the Texts of Ishmael Reed. 1984 and 1995. CD. Kip Hanrahan, with Frisner Augustin on tracks 2, 7, and 9. American Clave AMCL 1006.
- Desire Develops an Edge. 1983. CD. Kip Hanrahan, with Frisner Augustin on tracks 2, 11, and 14.
- New York City, Global Beat of the Boroughs. 2001. 2-CD set. Featuring Frisner Augustin and La Troupe Makandal on Disc II, track 9, "Rara Processional." Smithsonian Folkways SFW 40493.
- Rhythms of Rapture, Sacred Musics of Haitian Vodou. 1995. Featuring Frisner Augustin and La Troupe Makandal on track 7, "Simbi Dlo." Smithsonian Folkways SF CD 40464.
- Route de Frères. 2011. CD. Featuring Andrew Cyrille and Haitian Fascination (Hamiet Bluiett, Alix Pascal, Lisle Atkinson, Andrew Cyrille, Frisner Augustin). TUM Records 027.
