= Auguste de Pradines =

Haitian musician (1879–1947)

Auguste Linstant de Pradines
- Also known as: Ti Candio or Kandjo
- Born: Auguste Linstant de Pradines; September 10, 1879; Paris, France
- Died: 8 October 1947 (aged 68) Port-au-Prince, Haiti
- Genres: Haitian Folk

Auguste Linstant de Pradines, also known as August de Pradines, Ti Candio or Kandjo (10 September 1879 – October 1947) was an influential Haitian musician who largely created the archetype of the Haitian troubadour. Over nearly five decades, de Pradines composed love songs as well as songs of political and social commentary, traveling throughout Haiti to perform in clubs, at private parties, in theaters, and outdoor rallies. de Pradines had twelve children, including his daughter Emerante de Pradines Morse who also became a prominent Haitian musician, as did her son, Richard Auguste Morse, and another of Auguste de Pradines' grandsons, Michel Martelly. Martelly also served as the president of Haiti from 2011 to 2016.

== Early & personal life ==
Auguste Linstant de Pradines was born in Paris, France on 10 September 1879. He was the son of prominent Haitian lawyer Linstant de Pradines. At 9 years of age, while living in France with his father, Auguste was diagnosed with polio. Physicians recommended that he return to Haiti, where Auguste was homeschooled. Five years later, at the age of 14, when due to his polio Auguste had no control over the left part of his body, he was "carried on his back" to

a Vodou ceremony in La Plaine du Cul de Sac, where his family owned a plantation. At the ceremony, someone possessed by the lwa (Haitian deity) Erzuli Freda performed a healing ritual, which purportedly gave the young artist, nearly paralyzed from his illness, increased mobility with the aid of a cane. Upon returning home later that day, Kandjo composed his greatest song in Kreyòl: "Erzulie nennen O," a tribute to the lwa who had given him increased ability to walk.

In 1997, Averill wrote that this song, Erzulie, "became one of his [de Pradines'] most beloved compositions and a part of the Haitian folkloric repertory up to the present day."

Auguste's schooling included a "strong course of music", and he became proficient on piano, guitar, mandolin, and other instruments. By age 19 Auguste, who became professionally known as Kandjo, had devoted himself to a musical career. In 1903, he was chosen to sing the premier of the Haitian national anthem, La Dessalinienne.

de Pradines married Amarante Jean Pierre, who was of Haitian and Spanish descent. Together they had twelve children, nine of whom survived past an early age. Their daughter, Emerante de Pradines Morse, also became a prominent Haitian musician, as did her son, Richard Auguste Morse, and another grandson, Michel Martelly, who also served as president of Haiti (2011-2016).

== Musical career ==
Beginning in the 1890s, Kandjo was a prolific composer of up to four songs per week. Nearly all of Kandjo's songs were written in Haitian Kreyòl (Creole). Over nearly five decades, he composed love songs, as well as satirical songs and songs of political and social commentary. He would travel throughout Haiti to perform. In Port-au-Prince as well as throughout Haitian provinces, Kandjo "was in great demand as a singer before, during, and after the [1915-1934 US] occupation in clubs, at private parties, in theaters, and eventually at outdoor rallies". Kandjo

fashioned a career that mixed bitter social satire ("Pa fe m sa"), patriotism, and tender local themes ("Erzulie") on a musical platform that combined French chanson, Haitian mereng, and Haitian traditional-style melodies. With his knack for capturing popular sentiments, he won for himself a devoted audience that spanned urban and rural environments (he sang at many rural fèt chanpèts) and all social classes. Although the term twoubadou was used at the time only for itinerant singers and small bands that played for hand outs, it later came to be applied to the type of populist singer of topical merengs personified by Kandjo... [who] largely created this archetype of the Haitian troubadour.

Kandjo, "like many urban, educated Haitians", had a mixed reaction to the occupation of Haiti by the United States (1915-1934). Initially he believed that outside intervention was needed to address internecine Haitian strife, and Kandjo's songs of the early occupation period were "reflective and philosophical." However, over time, Kandjo became disillusioned by US abuses, such as the "exploitive economic treaty and... harsh American tactics during the strike at the agronomy school and in other crises. Kandjo opposed these abuses, and became "remembered as an artist who opposed the occupation in its latter years. In his home city of Port-au-Prince and throughout the provinces, he was in great demand as a singer before, during, and after the occupation in clubs, at private parties, in theaters, and eventually at outdoor rallies." Kandjo wrote satirical songs and in other ways participated in the campaign to unseat Louis Borno, president of Haiti from 1922 to 1930. In this struggle, "On may occasions the targets of Kandjo's barbs attempted to intimidate him, including one time in which he had to crawl over an embassy wall to obtain protection." Yet, as explained by Kandjo's daughter, Emerante Morse,

If the [Haitian] public is for a singer, there is nothing the government can do, you know, about that. I saw that with my father when he make that... I think the song was "Pedale."... The police got a call from the palace, they invade the theater, and so the people come and brought him to his house. That's a Haitian trait among the lower class of people: If they are yours [for you], you can trust that there is nothing going to happen to you.

== Works ==
Well known songs composed by Kandjo include

- "Erzuli nennen O", a song in honor of the Haitian traditional religious deity Erzuli;
- "Dodo Turgeau," also known as “Toutes renmen se renmen", a classic love song;
- "Angelique O," a critique of US imperialist occupation of Haiti (1915 to 1934), and of the government of Haitian President Louis Borno. Yet 'On the final day of the occupation, the Garde d'Haiti, accustomed to marching to "Semper Fidelis" and the "Halls of Montezuma," instead asked their musical corps to play "Angelique O" as the troops marched in front of 10,000 people.'
- "Pa fè m sa" ("Don't do me like that"), based on Damocles Vieux's poem "Choucoune", in which politicians are criticized by name;
- "Sa ki fe sa dous konsa" (What makes this so sweet);
- "Se la raj" (It's all the rage);
- "Qu'est-ce qui frappe à ma porte" (Who's knocking at my door?);
- "Mete fren" (Put on the brakes);

Other compositions include:

- "Senateur King" which "praised an American senator who had opposed the financial treaty imposed on Haiti";
- "Nap pedale" (We're pedaling), an anti-occupation satire;
- "Ou pop repedale" (You're not pedaling again);
- "Merci Papa Vincent", thanking President Vincent who presided over end of occupation;

== Death ==
Auguste died on an unknown day in October 1947, age 68, from unknown causes.
