= Yanvalou =

- Native name: Haitian Creole: Yanvalu
- Etymology: Fon: humble plea
- Genre: Haitian Vodou
- Time signature: 12/8
- Tempo: Generally Slow-Medium (6/8 or 12/8)
- Instrument: Rada drums
- Origin: Benin
- Related dances: Rada Rite (Zepaule, Nago, Mahi, Ibo) honoring Agwé and Damballah

Yanvalou is a rhythm and dance originating in Haitian Vodou Its name means "humble plea" in Fon Language. The Yanvalou is performed during the Rada rituals of Haitian Vodou in honor of Damballah, the serpent spirit or the lwa of fertility. and Agwé, the deity of the sea.

== Origins ==
Yanvalou originates from Benin, West Africa.Derived from the Fon and Mahi peoples of present-day Benin.

== Description ==
- The Yanvalou Rhythm is characterized by its slow and fluid movements, resembling waves on the ocean Slow and hypnotic,the Yanvalou dance symbolizes the spiritual connection with the deities.
- The physicality of the dance is characterized by the hands being placed on bent knees, and snake-like or wave movements. Yanvalou's main movement is the spinal undulation, which flowing body movements, which go from head to pelvis; you can visually compare to the "boneless" movement of the Tiv Swange. The center of gravity is low, knees are bent, and the undulating with the torso, spine, chest, and solar plexus. It has several variations

== Variations ==
Yanvalou Fran is the base version

- Yanvalou debout (standing),
- Yanvalou des bas (squatting),
- Yanvalou z'epaules (a "shoulder dance"), etc.

=== Yanvalou Gede ===
Yanvalou Gede is a slower version of the Banda rhythm. Used before progressing to the customary, faster Banda in the Rada rites. This is a Gede-specific version of the Rada, Yanvalou dance.Particularly for the Fet Gede, or the "Festival of the Dead".

=== Yanvalou Maskowan ===
Yanvalou Maskowan is the more advanced and involves more rhythmic engagement It requires mastery of all of the other forms of Yanvalou. Close to the Yanvalou Gede but more specific to the Maskawon style than the ceremony.

== Instruments ==
Yanvalou rhythm is played on a specific set of 3 percussion instruments:

- the maman
- seconde (or "segun")
- boula (or "bass") drums

Also along is an ogan (an iron bell).

== See also ==
- Dance in Haiti
- Haitian music
- Haitian art
- Haitian culture
- Haitian mythology
- Haitian Vodou drumming
- Afro-Caribbean music
