= Jeanguy Saintus =

Jeanguy leads here. For the name Jean-Guy, see Jean-Guy

Jeanguy Saintus is a Haitian choreographer, dancer and dancing educator.

Saintus was born in 1964 in Port-au-Prince. He studied anthropology, sociology and languages, Haitian traditional dance, and classical, modern and contemporary technique.

He is one of the founders of the dance company Ayikodans, which in twenty years time grew to be a professional group of dancers with an own center and training program. With his own Afro-contemporary techniques he has had an important part in the development of Caribbean dance. Next to his performances, he is dancing teacher in Jamaica and other countries.

Saintus is a self-taught dancer. Each year he researches and composes new choreographies, in which he explores new limits. In his choreographies one can notice a melting-pot of Caribbean culture and the daily life of Haiti. Furthermore, his work shows elements from the folklore and religious Haitian Vodou culture as well as diverse African, Amerindian and French influences.

In 2008, Saintus received a Prince Claus Award from the Netherlands within the theme of Culture and the human body.
