= Lumane Casimir =

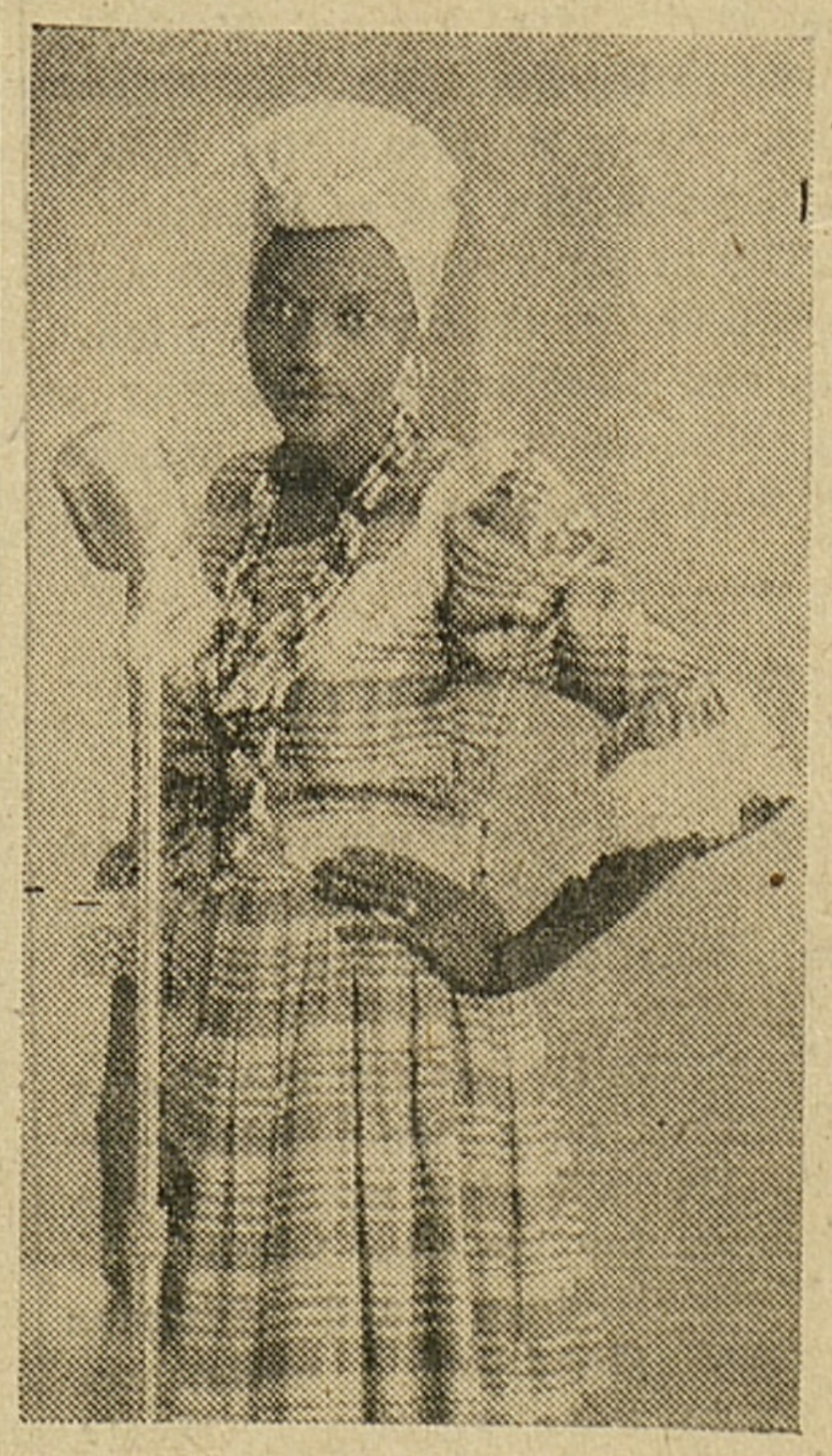
- Casimir in the "Haiti Sun", October 14, 1956

Background information
- Born: October 14, 1922; Cap-Haïtien, Haiti
- Died: May 14, 1957 (aged 34) Port-au-Prince, Haiti
- Genres: Haitian folk, meringue, troubadour
- Occupations: Singer, folkloric troubadour
- Instruments: Vocals, guitar
- Years active: 1940–1952

Lumane Casimir (October 14, 1922 – May 14, 1957) was a Haitian folkloric singer and pioneering female troubadour. She played a central role in promoting Haitian folk music and Vodou-inspired traditions during the mid-20th century. Casimir performed both nationally and internationally and is recognized as a key figure in Haitian cultural heritage.

== Early life ==
Lumane Casimir was born on October 14, 1922, in Cap-Haïtien, Haiti. She grew up in poverty and showed early musical talent, performing traditional Haitian songs and developing a distinct vocal style.

She emerged within the Haitian Troubadour movement, which combined social satire and music, blending Cuban Guajira rhythms with Haitian meringue. Casimir performed on the streets of Cap-Haïtien before joining professional orchestras such as Jazz Mano and Youou in the early 1940s.

== Career ==
=== Move to Port-au-Prince ===
In 1946, Casimir relocated to Port-au-Prince, performing in neighborhoods like Bas-Peu-de-Chose with ensembles such as Jacques Nelson's Trio Astoria. She received mentorship from pianist Lina Mathon Blanchet and composer Antalcidas Murat, who refined her vocal technique and composed many of her signature songs.

=== National recognition ===
Casimir gained national attention with a performance at the inauguration of Belladère in 1948. She performed at the 1949 Bicentennial celebrations of Port-au-Prince with the orchestra Jazz des Jeunes and drummer Ti-Roro. Her repertoire included songs such as Carole Acao, Panama M'tombé, and Papa Guédé Bel Garçon. She became known as the Reine des Meringues (Queen of Meringues).

=== International performances ===
Casimir performed internationally, including in the Dominican Republic and New York City during "Haiti Week" in 1951. She was praised by American composer Irving Berlin and compared to opera soprano Lily Pons by the Haiti Sun.

== Social challenges ==
Despite her prominence, Casimir faced social barriers due to her Creole-speaking peasant background and limited formal education. Notably, her contributions were omitted from Madeleine Sylvain Bouchereau's 1957 work Haïti et ses femmes, which focused on educated, elite women.

== Illness and decline ==
Around 1952, Casimir contracted a severe illness, believed to be leprosy compounded by tuberculosis and ankylosis. Her husband abandoned her, and she lived in destitution until rediscovered in 1956 by Antoine Herard of Radio Port-au-Prince.

== Death and legacy ==
Lumane Casimir died on May 14, 1957, at the age of 34. Posthumously, she has been recognized as a key figure in Haitian cultural heritage, with her songs remaining part of the national repertoire. Authors and historians have highlighted her role in legitimizing Haiti's African-rooted musical traditions.

== Selected songs ==
- Caroline Acao
- Panama M Tonbe
- Papa Gede Bél Gason
- Isit an Ayiti
- Larivyè m ta prale
