= Erzulie (song) =

1890s Haitian folk song by Kandjo

"Erzulie nennen O", also known simply as "Erzulie", is a song composed at the age of 14 by the Haitian singer Kandjo (1879–1947), also known as Auguste de Pradines. "Erzulie" is often said to be one of his most beloved songs. Composed in the 1890s, the song continued to be played as "part of the Haitian folkloric repertory" at the end of the 20th century, more than 100 years after its composition.

== Origins ==
"Erzulie" was composed in honor of Erzulie Freda, a well-known female lwa (Vodou deity), in gratitude for healing. The teenager Auguste de Pradines was in need of healing because at nine years of age, while living in France with his father, the child Auguste had been diagnosed with polio. His family followed physician recommendations and returned him to Haiti, where he was homeschooled. Five years later, at the age of 14, when due to his polio Auguste had no control over the left part of his body, he was "carried on his back" to

a Vodou ceremony in La Plaine du Cul de Sac, where his family owned a plantation. At the ceremony, someone possessed by the lwa Erzuli Freda performed a healing ritual, which purportedly gave the young artist, nearly paralyzed from his illness, increased mobility with the aid of a cane. Upon returning home later that day, Kandjo composed his greatest song in Kreyòl: "Erzuli nennen O," a tribute to the lwa who had given him increased ability to walk.

== Notable performances ==
In 1995, "Erzulie" was performed as part of the Bouyon Rasin ("Roots Soup") Festival. The song was performed in two-part harmony by Emerante Morse and Martha Jean-Claude
