= Route de Frères =

Studio album by Andrew Cyrille
- Released: October 28, 2011
- Recorded: December 14 and 15, 2005
- Venue: Clinton Studios, New York City
- Genre: Jazz, world music
- Label: Tum Records; TUM CD 027
- Producer: Petri Haussila

Andrew Cyrille chronology
Opus de Life (2009)	Route de Frères (2011)	The Declaration of Musical Independence (2016)

Route de Frères is an album by drummer Andrew Cyrille. It was recorded in December 2005 at Clinton Studios in New York City, and was released through Tum Records on October 18, 2011. On the album, Cyrille is joined by members of the group known as Haitian Fascination: Hamiet Bluiett on baritone saxophone, Alix Pascal on acoustic guitar, Lisle Atkinson on bass, and Frisner Augustin on percussion and vocals.

== Background ==
When Cyrille, who was born in Brooklyn but is of Haitian descent, was seven years old, his parents took him to Haiti, the first of several trips. During one of his visits, Cyrille noticed a street named "Route de Frères" ("Road of the Brothers"), and the name eventually sparked the idea for the musical project called Haitian Fascination, bringing together musicians from the United States (Cyrille, Bluiett, and Atkinson) and Haiti (Pascal and Augustin).

== Music ==
"Marinèt" is Haitian folk song about a spirit, and has been used in Vodou ceremonies for many years. "Deblozay," the title of which means "chaos," was written by Pascal, and is about the need for Haitians to voice their frustration with the chaotic situation in their country. Cyrille's "Hope Springs Eternal" is his "wish for Haiti to prosper in all aspects of its humanity." "Isaura," composed by Bluiett, is a love song for a dancer from Rio de Janeiro.

Cyrille's three-part "Route de Frères" forms the centerpiece of the album, and recalls his time in Haiti as "very rich, pleasant and different experiences for me, being a second grader on vacation from a grammar school in Bedford-Stuyvesant, Brooklyn, New York." Part 1 is a sonic portrait of Anjubeau, near Port-au-Prince, where Cyrille met a number of his relatives for the first time, and where he experienced rural Haitian life. Part 2 portrays a visit to Port-au-Prince, and "the daily organization and movement about the city of the people living there." Part 3 imagines what music must have been like in the United States when Cyrille's parents arrived, his father in 1919, his mother in 1926.

Atkinson's "C'mon Baby" is named for one of his favorite phrases, and features a strong bass line. The title of "Sankofa," written by Bluiett, refers to a long-necked bird from Asante mythology which has its head turned in order to take an egg from its back, symbolizing "taking from the past what is good and bringing it to the present." "Spirit Music," by Cyrille, has to do with his "feelings about the spirits of Africa and Haiti as well as any other good spirits of the world that wish to swing and get down with us." "Mais" is a percussion duo, and is based on the Haitian Yanvalou, a ritual dance honoring the spirits. "Ti Kawòl" was written by Nemours Jean-Baptiste, inventor of a musical style called Compas direct, which draws on both the African and European aspects of Haitian music. Jean-Baptiste recorded the tune in the mid-1960s, and it became popular in France during the following decade.

== Reception ==
Professional ratings
Review scores
Source	Rating
DownBeat	4/5 stars
All About Jazz #1	5/5 stars
All About Jazz #2	3.5/5 stars
All About Jazz #3	4/5 stars
Tom Hull – on the Web	A−

John Murph of DownBeat stated that Cyrille "delivers an abundance of beauty and ebullience" on the album, and remarked: "Throughout, Cyrille and his Haitian Fascination exhibit such sanguinity that each song will elicit wide smiles."

In a review for All About Jazz, Raul D'Gama Rose wrote: "To experience ecstasy without the memory of it would certainly be a travesty. Fortunately, it may now be possible to have both—to have the near-perfect memory of being in the throes of ecstasy—and it is all because of the music on Route de Frères by Andrew Cyrille and Haitian Fascination... this album is truly extraordinary." In a separate review for the same publication, Nic Jones called the disc "a record of warm and winning world music potent enough to lift the spirit in the depths of winter." In a third All About Jazz article, Dave Wayne commented: "Though Cyrille's deep understanding of both musical traditions goes a long way towards making this musical journey a success, it doesn't hurt that he's enlisted an all-star band to accompany him... Cyrille uses a frontline of baritone sax and acoustic guitar, backed by intricate percussion arrangements, to create some truly unique music. Cyrille and Augustin work together so tightly that it's difficult to tell who's playing what, and Pascal's guitar brings in an unexpected, almost Moorish-sounding element. Yet, the focal point is Bluiett's baritone saxophone."

Writing for ABC Radio National, Doug Spencer stated: "Andrew Cyrille is a legendary, much-recorded drummer but Route de Frères lovingly addresses something of which many admirers are unaware: his connection to Haiti... It is beautiful and truly unique."

Carlo Wolff, in a review for JazzTimes, wrote: "Route de Frères feels conversational, due largely to Bluiett's sharp, crying sax. Percussion man Frisner Augustin, who seamlessly melds beats with Cyrille on the party starter 'Mais,' laughs and exhorts on 'Marinèt,' the joyous opening track. An American born to Haitian parents, Cyrille also quickens 'Ti Kawòl,' the disc's itchy capper. A hybrid of American and Haitian musicians, this group plays music that spans the outside..., the earthy... and the spiritual."

In an article for Neo-Griot, Kalamu ya Salaam remarked: "If you're not familiar with Haitian music, you might be struck by how such joyful music can originate from a land that has seen so much tragedy. Nonetheless, it's 'island music' by way of its breezy cadences and African-derived rhythms. The Port-Au-Prince/New York hybrid fits together so naturally because, well, these are great musicians... Andrew Cyrille's fascination with Haitian music, bolstered by a healthy dose of Cyrille's extensive jazz legacy and a well-chosen lineup, makes Route De Frères a welcome new front in an already significant and storied career."

Writing for NPR Music, Kevin L. Carter praised "Marinet," referring to it as "a breezy but intense Haitian folk tune," and commenting: "As Hamiet Bluiett's baritone blows the clarion call of the Carnival vaksin, Cyrille and Augustin exhort each other with their voices and the percolating rhythms of their drums. The song is about a lwa, a vodou spirit — in this case a mischievous woman who acts strongly in the lives of adherents but must be appeased. All of the musicians here, Haitian and otherwise, seem to understand this instinctively, and their play is appropriately inspired."

== Track listing ==
1. "Marinèt" (traditional) - 7:02
2. "Deblozay" (Pascal) - 7:03
3. "Hope Springs Eternal" (Cyrille) - 8:40
4. "Isaura" (Bluiett) - 7:09
5. "Route de Frères, Part 1 - Hills Of Anjubeau" (Cyrille) - 5:24
6. "Route de Frères, Part 2 - Memories Of Port-au-Prince Afternoons" (Cyrille) - 3:16
7. "Route de Frères, Part 3 - Manhattan Swing" (Cyrille) - 6:02
8. "C'mon Baby" (Atkinson) - 2:55
9. "Sankofa" (Bluiett) - 4:18
10. "Spirit Music" (Cyrille) - 6:28
11. "Mais" (Cyrille, Augustin) - 3:18
12. "Ti Kawòl" (Nemours Jean-Baptiste) - 4:33

== Personnel ==
- Andrew Cyrille – drums
- Hamiet Bluiett – baritone saxophone
- Alix Pascal – acoustic guitar
- Lisle Atkinson – bass
- Frisner Augustin – percussion, vocals

== Production ==
- Petri Haussila – producer
- Robert Musso – recording engineer
