= Martha Jean-Claude =

Haitian writer, civil rights activist, entertainer and composer

Martha Jean-Claude (21 March 1919 – 14 November 2001) was a Haitian writer, civil rights activist, entertainer, and composer. She was born in Port-au-Prince, Haiti and was well known internationally during her life and could perform in many languages. Her singing career began during the late 1930s and early 1940s. She incorporated Haitian folklore and Haitian Vodou lyrics into her performances. She spoke out against Haitian authorities who were exploiting the Haitian people. She was arrested in 1952 during the administration of President Paul Eugene Magloire after publishing her play "Anriette". Officials considered it to be directed toward and against the government at that time. When she was arrested she was pregnant but was released two days before giving birth.

Jean-Claude was exiled to Cuba on 20 December 1952. She was married to Victor Mirabal, a Cuban journalist. Jean-Claude was well known to the Hispanic communities who admired her talent and activism. She was featured in radio and television broadcasts in Cuba. She appeared in the movie Yambaó (1957) that starred the Cuban-Mexican actress Ninón Sevilla. Cuba has claimed her as a great artist of that country. She became a member of The Cuban Union of Writers and Artists. She performed at many international venues that included: Salle Claude Campagne, Casa de las Américas in Cuba, Palais des Beaux-Arts in Paris, Madison Square Garden in New York City, Maison de L'UNESCO in Paris, United Nation Headquarters in New York City, and for the Faculty of Music at Montreal University. She traveled and visited almost all the nations of Central and South America and Angola. She also spoke in Panama against those who violated basic human rights in that country. She wrote and performed political songs. Jean-Claude also appeared in the Cuban film Simparele (1974) directed by Humberto Solás.

Jean-Claude had four children with Mirabal: Linda (an opera singer), Sandra (a musician), Magdalena (a physician living in Cuba), and Richard. Her son Richard Mirabal has served as director of the Martha Jean-Claude Foundation, which promotes cultural ties between Haiti and Cuba. Her son Richard produced the film Fanm De Zil [Woman of Two Islands] (2000) about her life and work. Jean-Claude returned to Haiti in 1986. She died in Havana, Cuba on 14 November 2001, aged 82, at her home there. She has been described as "...one of the most precious jewels Haiti has ever had."

== See also ==
- Emerante Morse
- Erzulie
