= Jenny Mézile =

Haitian choreographer

Jenny Mézile is a Haitian writer, dancer and choreographer. Fleeing the military repression after the coup against Jean-Bertrand Aristide, she started her performing arts career in France in 1992 with troupes such as Makina Loka and Banbòch Lakay. Mézile's first choreographed piece, Manzè Ida, premiered in 1997. Settling in Ivory Coast in 2006, she along with her husband Massidi Adiatou took leadership of dance-theatre troupe N’Soleh. In 2012 Mézile also launched the AFRIK URBANARTS dance and culture festival.

== Choreographic works ==
- 1997: Manzè Ida
- 2003: My Own Wara

== Literary works ==
- 2005: Toya, princesse des îles
