= Rara tech =

Electronic music genre

- Stylistic origins: Rara music; house
- Cultural origins: Early 2010s, Haiti
- Typical instruments: Tanbou; drums; modular synthesizer; percussion; personal computer

Rara tech is an electronic music subgenre that fuses the Afro-Haitian genre rara with house music. Haitian-style electronic dance music (EDM) in Haiti is often referred to as "HEDM" (Haitian electronic dance music). The origins of the genre and term was pioneered by Haitian artist, music producer, and DJ, Gardy Girault.
