= Rara music =

Festival music originated in Haiti

Rara is a form of festival music that originated in Haiti that is used for street processions, typically during Easter Week. The music centers on a set of cylindrical bamboo trumpets called vaksin, but also features drums, maracas, güiras or güiros (a percussion instrument), and metal bells, as well as alsos which are made from recycled metal, often coffee cans. The vaksin perform repeating patterns in hocket and often strike their instruments rhythmically with a stick while blowing into them. In the modern day, standard trumpets and saxophones may also be used. The genre though predominantly Afro-based has some Taino Amerindian elements to it such as the use of güiros and maracas.

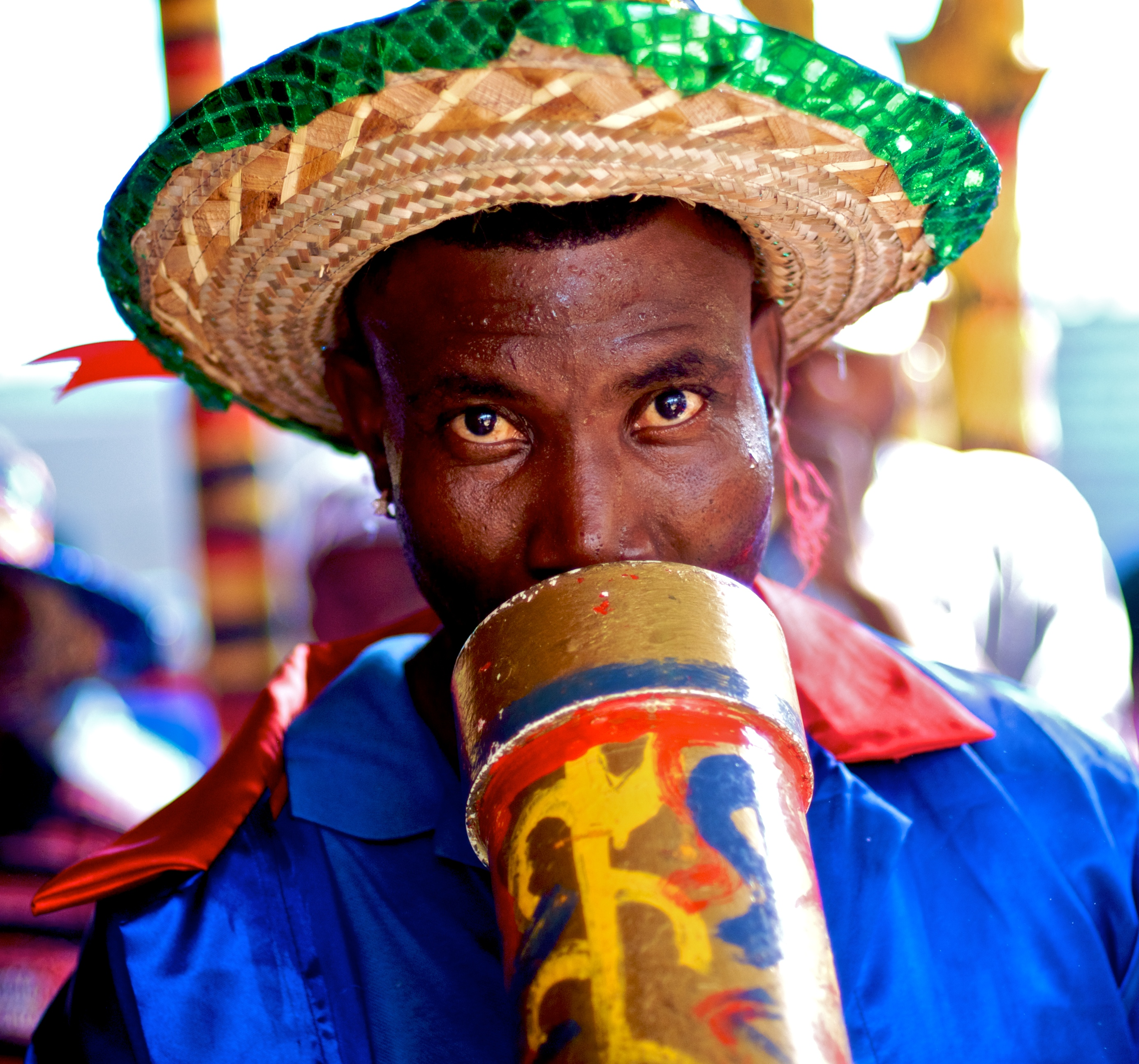
Musician playing a Bamboo horn called Vaksen

The songs are always performed in Haitian Creole and typically celebrate the African ancestry of the Afro-Haitian masses. Vodou is often implemented through the procession. Rara in Haiti is celebrated to commemorate part of the slave revolution that led to independence. At the time when it started, slaves were not allowed to travel or communicate between plantations. They were allowed to leave the plantation only to go to church for Easter. It was the one time each year where mixing, even in chains, was allowed. The African people of different tribes used both speech and music to communicate. Beating drums were used as a common rudimentary universal language. Stripped of that tool, the African slaves used the sound of their feet marching to church to make rhythm and communicate between chains. These minute and terse communications played a part in planning the many revolutions and led to an eventual independence. During rara Haitians dance and march in the street while the band plays. Each band has their own rhythm that defines them even while marching in the dark. It is a celebration of the now but also a remembrance of the ancestors who made it so. Each person has their own unique way of dancing to the beat. Rara in Haiti is often used for political purposes, with candidates commissioning songs praising them and their campaigns. Rara lyrics also often address difficult issues, such as political oppression or poverty. Consequently, rara groups and other musicians have been banned from performing and even forced into exile—most notably, folk singer Manno Charlemagne who later returned to Haiti and was elected mayor of Port-au-Prince in the 1990s.

Rara performances are often performed while marching and are often accompanied by twirlers employing metal batons. Performances generally begin on Ash Wednesday and culminate at Easter Weekend.

Rara was also an important part of a slave's daily lives. Working in the fields, and plantation of endless crops, was agony. And at the end of the day, Raras would take place in the streets, to show how good they were still doing, even after such hard and meaningless work. After Haiti's independence, rara bands took the streets by storm to celebrate winning the war.

The Rara festival is likely to have developed during the period of colonial slavery. There is evidence that African and Afro-Creole slaves in the French colony of Saint-Domingue paraded with drums and instruments on Easter Sunday. There is also some evidence that troupes of maroons marched with drummers, horns, and singers, similarly to Rara.

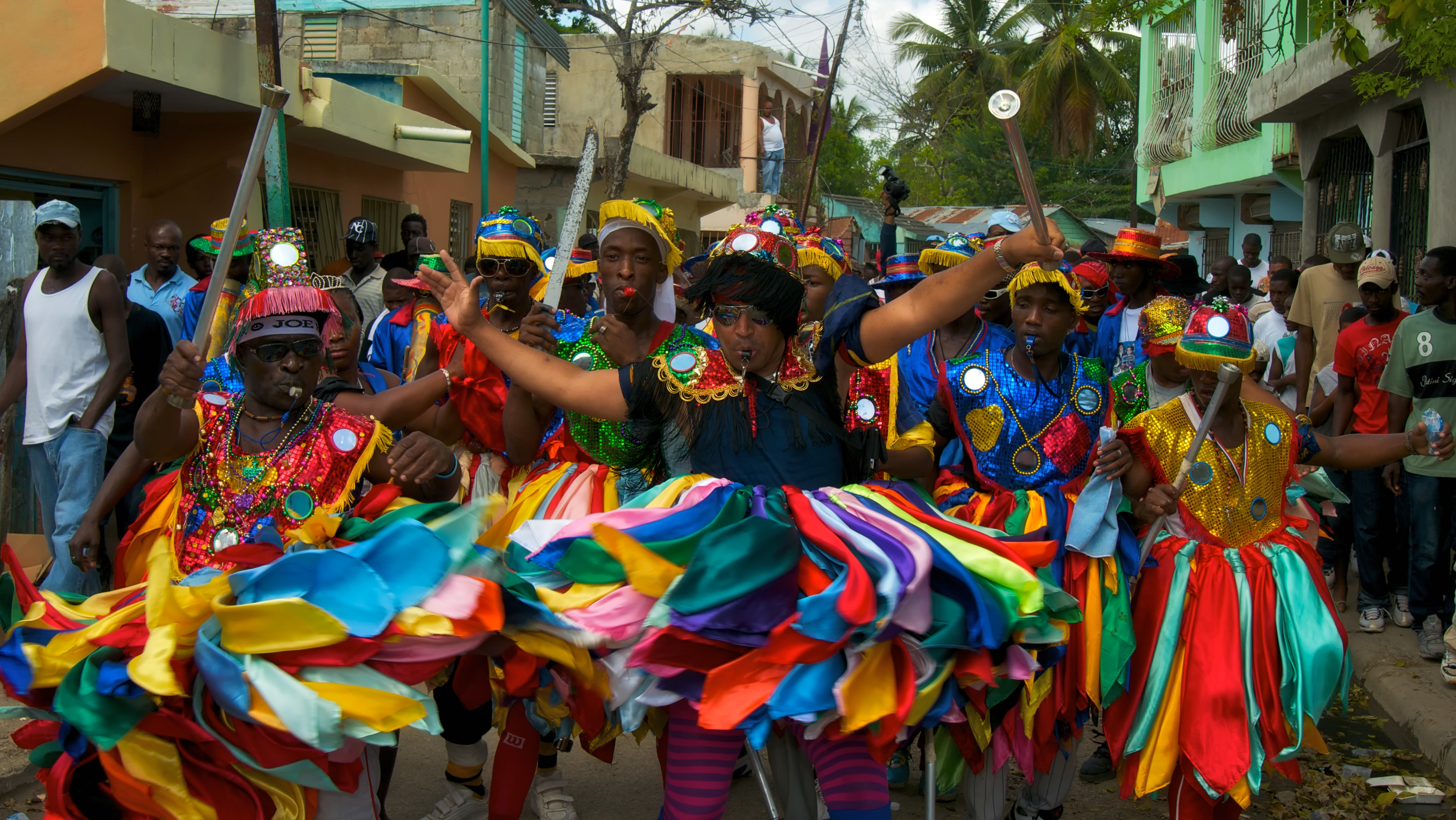
Gaga dance

Since the 1990s, Haitian Americans have been performing Rara in New York City's Prospect Park in the summer on Sundays.

== Rara tech ==
Rara tech is an electronic music subgenre that fuses the Afro-Haitian genre rara with house music. Haitian-style electronic dance music (EDM) in Haiti is often referred to as "HEDM" (Haitian electronic dance music). The origins of the genre and term was pioneered by Haitian artist, music producer, and DJ, Gardy Girault.

== See also ==
- Haitian Carnival
- Haitian Vodou drumming
- Rara tech
