= Gardy Girault =

Haitian electronic musician

- Born: Port-au-Prince, Haiti
- Genres: EDM; Afro house; Progressive house; Deep house; Tech house; Lounge
- Occupations: Electronic musician; DJ; Remixer; Composer; Programmer; Record producer
- Instruments: Digital audio workstation; Keyboard; Synthesizer; Guitar; Drums
- Years active: 2007–present
- Label: RiZing Musik
- Website: gardygirault.com

Gardy Girault (French pronunciation: [ɡaʁdi ʒiʁo]), stylized as G∆rdy Gir∆ult, is a Haitian electronic musician, DJ, remixer and record producer. He is a pioneer of an electronic music subgenre called rara tech that fuses the Afro-Haitian genre rara with house music. He integrates ancestral elements native to his land.

== Early life ==
Girault was born in Port-au-Prince, Haiti.

== Career ==
His album Kiskeya was released in 2015.
