= Jean Murai =

American singer

Jean Murai (April 11, 1913 — September 28, 2007) was a Greenwich Village-based New York City folksinger and activist.

Born into a working-class family in Brooklyn, Murai received a B.A. in languages and a Master's in psychology at Hunter College. She also studied piano, dancing and singing. As a child, she learned Yiddish folk songs, later adding songs from countries such as Haiti, Cuba, Spain and France. She recorded a popular album of music, "Mama, I Want a Husband".

She died, aged 94, at Cabrini Hospice in New York City on September 28, 2007, following a stroke. Murai was twice married, but had no children.
