= Jean-Guy Gratton =

Canadian ice hockey player

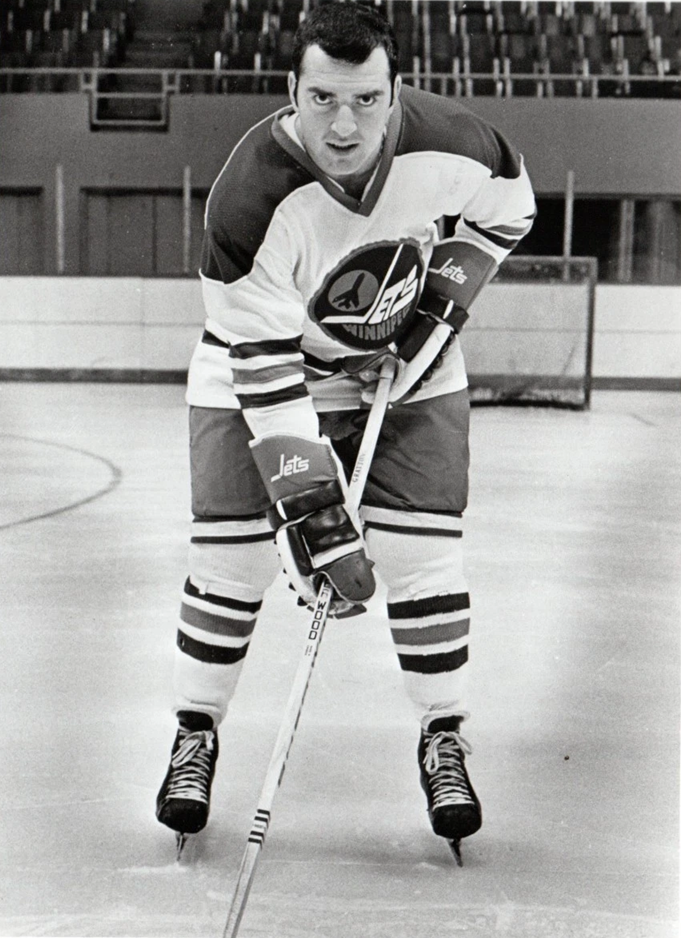
- Gratton in 1973 photo
- Born: March 8, 1949 (age 77) Ste-Anne-des-Plaines, Quebec, Canada
- Height: 5 ft 9 in (175 cm)
- Weight: 169 lb (77 kg; 12 st 1 lb)
- Position: Right wing
- Shot: Right
- Played for: Winnipeg Jets
- Playing career: 1967–1980

Jean-Guy Gratton (born March 8, 1949) is a Canadian retired professional ice hockey forward. He would play 188 games in the World Hockey Association with the Winnipeg Jets.

== Career statistics ==
=== Regular season and playoffs ===
			Regular season					Playoffs
Season	Team	League	GP	G	A	Pts	PIM	GP	G	A	Pts	PIM
1965–66	Palestre Nationale	MMJHL	33	14	11	25	34	—	—	—	—	—
1966–67	Palestre Nationale	MMJHL	39	39	49	88	135	—	—	—	—	—
1967–68	Montreal Junior Canadiens	OHA	48	16	12	28	20	—	—	—	—	—
1968–69	Montreal Junior Canadiens	OHA	15	2	5	7	39	—	—	—	—	—
1968–69	Trois–Rivieres Maple Leafs	QJAHL	––	46	47	93	0	—	—	—	—	—
1969–70	Hershey Bears	AHL	57	11	7	18	13	7	2	0	2	6
1970–71	Hershey Bears	AHL	65	15	31	46	31	4	0	2	2	4
1971–72	Hershey Bears	AHL	74	30	34	64	42	4	3	0	3	0
1972–73	Winnipeg Jets	WHA	71	15	12	27	37	12	1	1	2	4
1973–74	Winnipeg Jets	WHA	68	12	21	33	13	2	0	0	0	0
1974–75	Winnipeg Jets	WHA	49	4	8	12	2	—	—	—	—	—
1975–76	Hershey Bears	AHL	73	35	58	93	38	8	1	3	4	0
1979–80	Lausanne HC	Swiss–A	––	19	12	31	0	—	—	—	—	—
WHA totals			188	31	41	72	52	14	1	1	2	4
