= Riva Nyri Précil =

Haitian-American singer, songwriter, and author

Riva Nyri Prècil (born March 28, 1989, Brooklyn, New York) is a Haitian-American singer, songwriter, and author.

== Early life and education ==
Riva Nyri Précil was born in Brooklyn. Her mother, Michelle Karshan, is an American of Lithuanian Jewish and Irish descent and produced and hosted the radio show “Sak Pase” (1991-1995) while her father, Privat Précil was a Haitian who worked in the US as a journalist and lawyer. Riva and her family moved to Haiti when she was five years old as her mother got a job in Haiti. Her mother worked for the Haitian government specifically on foreign press liaising, using her foreign heritage as an advantage to manage the foreign press who visited Haiti.

While growing up in Haiti, Riva was exposed to and studied under many of the great masters of Haiti's cultural and artistic scene. She was in a theatre troupe, Ateliee Edoision, and took various dancing with Viviane Gauthier and Artcho Danse— sculpting, painting, and singing classes, which will later develop her as a wholesome artist skilled in several aspects of art. Riva learned her sculpting and painting skills from renowned Haitian artist, Jean-Claude "Tiga" Garoute. In her early teens, Riva already started to teach art classes to young children who were in her neighborhood.

She was already musically influenced by her mother as she listened to exotic and various genres of music from all over the world starting from jazz and soul, to Indian and Arabic music. As her family was open-minded to experience, she attended many Haitian Vodou ceremonies, learning both the beautiful and eerie parts of Vodou culture. When Riva was fifteen she had to leave Haiti and return to New York because of the dangerous condition of Haiti due to the 2004 Haitian coup d'état.

While back in New York, she attended LaGuardia High School of Music & Art and Performing Arts as a sophomore where she majored in vocal performance. She graduated in 2007 and continued her education at Loyola University of New Orleans. She received her BA in Music Therapy in 2011 and completed her one-year residency in New York at Beth Israel Hospital.

During her time in Loyola University, she became skillful in playing guitar and piano and continued singing. When the 2010 Haiti earthquake happened, Riva and few other Haitian students, who were less than ten people, organized a giant fundraiser to support people back in Haiti.

== Career ==
=== Singer ===
After Riva graduated Loyola University Riva came back to New York. In 2014, Riva realized the lack of Haitian Creole contents in the world and felt a “sense of duty to dedicate herself to keep the Haitian art alive and conserve it for her ancestors and for her country.” This led her to start working on her first album “Perle De Culture”. By meeting her present fiance in the end of 2013, Monvelyno Alexis, who also is a prominent musician, Riva worked with him to create an album independently.

The songs were mainly traditional Haitian music with a modern twist. The songs were newly arranged in a jazz style by her fiance, Alexis. Riva worked during the daytime and recorded songs at night at a studio in Brooklyn called “Kamoken Studio”. The studio was owned by Chico Boyer, who was a pioneer of Haitian roots music. He even personally participated in a few songs on the album as a bass player. In 2015, the album was completed and released through CD Baby which allowed Riva to officially launch herself and put her music out to the public.

Ever since her album was released, she is constantly gigging around the world to promote Haitian culture and its beauty. She has performed at the New Orleans Jazz & Heritage Festival —alongside Emeline Michel —Carifesta XII hosted in Haiti, the Haitian Flag Day Celebration at Brooklyn's Borough Hall, and various other ceremonies. Recently, she has been working with a label, “Strictly Rhythm” to musically expand her horizon and work in different styles of music such as Afro House and dance music.

=== Author ===
Her career as an author also started in 2014. Her interest in writing Haitian books initially started from translating children’s books in Haitian Creole from a non-profit organization, Li Li Li, organized by Riva and her mother to translate various children's book in Haitian Creole and to train people to read the books to children in Haiti after the collapse of a lot of schools in Haiti (2011–12).

In 2014, Riva decided to write a children’s book about mermaids and their world underwater, which was set in Jacmel. She submitted her work to a Haitian short story competition hosted by Educa Vision, and by winning the competition her book, Anaëlle Ak Lasirèn, was published in 2015.

=== Styles and influences ===
Ever since she was young, she was influenced by various genres of music originating from all parts of the world. However, she was primarily influenced by Haitian music, and jazz, which allowed her to grow up to be the musician she is now.

Her style of music and vocals came through as she successfully merged jazz and Haitian music. Her muses, who influenced her ever since she was young, are Billie Holiday, Ella Fitzgerald, and Sarah Vaughan. She actually performed Holiday’s and Fitzgerald's pieces for her audition to enter LaGuardia High School for Performing Arts.

== Other ventures ==
After Riva graduated from Loyola University, she introduced "Love, Nyri", a modern handmade jewelry line, in 2012. The design of the jewelry is very much inspired by a traditional Haitian jewelry style. Nowadays, most of her products are custom order. The materials used range from brass, gold, silver, crystals, to various gems.

As Riva has been taking dance classes since she was young and has taught several dance classes for the 2010 Haiti earthquake fundraiser, she continues to teach traditional Haitian dance in New York City.

Her current dance class “tout se pa” which means “no wrong steps” covers traditional Haitian dances such as Yanvalou, Congo, Nago, Ibo, Mayi, Rabonday, and Banda. Her dance class is targeted towards Haitians in New York City who never had a chance to experience their own culture.

She is a prominent performer and has performed at the New Orleans Jazz & Heritage Festival, Carifesta XII hosted in Haiti, and the Haitian Flag Day Celebration at Brooklyn's Borough Hall. She was a panelist and performer at the Women's Empowerment Luncheon hosted by the Haitian American Student Association at Syracuse University in February 2016. Riva performs in New York City alongside her band Bohio Music.
