= Emerante Morse =

Haitian singer, dancer and folklorist

Emerante de Pradines Morse
- Born: Emerante de Pradines; 24 September 1918; Rivière Froide, Haiti
- Died: 4 January 2018 (aged 99); Port-au-Prince, Haiti
- Occupations: Singer, dancer and folklorist
- Father: Auguste de Pradines

Emerante Morse, also known as Emerante de Pradines Morse (born Emerante de Pradines; 24 September 1918 – 4 January 2018) was a Haitian singer, dancer and folklorist, and the daughter of Haitian entertainer Auguste de Pradines (better known as Ti Candio or Kandjo).

== Early life ==
Emerante's mother, Amarante Jean Pierre, implored Our Lady of Mount Carmel, patroness of the Carmelite order, to give her a child, a baby girl, "promising that in return she would devote this child to the virgin saint." Emerante was born when her mother was "on vacation at Rivière Froid".

== Musical and dance career ==
De Pradines went to Washington, D.C. in 1941 as a featured singer and dancer in a troupe led by Lina Mathon-Blanchet. After her return to Haiti, de Pradines performed in a regular concert series at the Rex Theater in Port-au-Prince. She often sang renditions of traditional vodou songs, "then a novelty in Haitian social life".

De Pradines sang Vodou songs in Creole on the radio when it was dangerous to do so, and was the first Haitian singer to sign a recording contract with a record company. She married Richard M. Morse, a Latin-American scholar and writer from the United States who she met while studying in New York with Martha Graham. Her albums were released internationally, including by Smithsonian Folkways in the United States.

At a young age, de Pradines was a student of Martha Graham. Between 1978 and 1981 Emerante de Pradines Morse taught dance classes in the Athletic Department of Yale University. There, her students learned modern Graham technique as well as Haitian dance. Affectionately known by her Stanford students as Emy Morse, she choreographed several dance productions such as "Carnival!" for which she designed the costumes. Emerante De Pradines Morse made the costumes herself with the assistance of one of her students, Harvetta Silvarya Strozier, whom she taught how to make her designs out of fabric, raffia, ribbon, and other materials - without using purchased patterns.

At Stanford University, Emy Morse was the epitome of beauty and physical fitness. In her late fifties and early sixties, she showed her students how to do all of her warm-up dance steps and stretches as well as every choreographed step and routine whether simple or complex. She stressed the importance of elegant movement and demonstrated in minute detail how such was to be done.

== Reception and later life ==
She and her husband had one daughter, Marise, and one son, Richard Auguste. Her son, also known as Richard A. Morse, also became a musician and prominent public figure in Port-au-Prince, Haiti.

De Pradines Morse was one of six women profiled in a documentary film by director Arnold Antonin entitled Six Exceptional Haitian Women (Six femmes d’exception). She was also the focus of a 2017 article in the Journal of Haitian Studies.

One commentator wrote that "Given the time in Haitian social history when [Emerante de Pradines] chose to sang vodou songs, popular songs, she stands almost by herself in Haitian history."

== Death ==
She died on 4 January 2018 at Saint-Esprit Hospital (Hôpital Saint-Esprit), rue Capois, Port-au-Prince, aged 99. Her remains were cremated on 6 January after a private ceremony attended by relatives. On February 3, 2018, a thanksgiving mass was held in her honor at Holy Trinity Cathedral. At the mass, Emerante Morse's daughter in law Lunise Morse sang the traditional song "Carolina Caro", a favorite of the deceased. Emerante Morse was also remembered and celebrated for numerous philanthropic activities, including education of young people, founding the school La Ruche in Pelerin (Pétion-Ville), and supporting other institutions such as Octane Deslouches Martissant and other schools and cultural centers outside the capital.

== See also ==
- Martha Jean-Claude
- Erzulie (song)
