= Viviane Gauthier =

Haitian dancer and teacher (1918–2017)

- Born: March 17, 1918
- Died: June 1, 2017 (aged 99)
- Occupation: dancer
- Known for: Viviane Gauthier School of Dance

Viviane (or Vivianne) Gauthier (March 17, 1918 – June 1, 2017) was a Haitian dancer and teacher of Haitian folkloric dance who studied Haitian folklore with Katherine Dunham-trained Lavinia Williams of which she is considered the heir. She eventually opened the Viviane Gauthier School of Dance in Port-au-Prince, Haiti.

One of her students has opened a dance company in Paris, and Master Drummer Frisner Augustin, who drummed for her, was a recipient of a National Endowment for the Arts fellowship in the United States. Haitian-American singer Riva Nyri Précil is another alumna of her dance school. Many prominent Haitian dancers and dance teachers have received training from her at some point in their career, including Lynn William Rouzier, Joëlle Donatien Belot, Jean Appolon, Mikerline Pierre and Lionel St. Surin.

== Early life and career ==
Gauthier learned to dance by imitating the workers on her parents' sugar plantation. Her father died when she was very young, a circumstance which caused her to have to work to help support the family. She grew up in a very strict household. She was the grand-daughter of Haitian President Florvil Hyppolite but did not find out until age 30. For a time she lived in Cap-Haïtien at Rue 24. She studied accounting at the Maurice Laroche school and practiced as an accountant of the Haitian National Lottery for 21 years while studying and teaching dance in the afternoons.

Her formal training appears to have started in the early 1950s when Lavinia Williams, an African-American following in the footsteps of Katherine Dunham came to teach in Port-au-Prince at the invitation of the Haitian government. Gauthier was around 34. She is said to have served as Lavinia Williams' assistant at the Haitian Institute for Folklore and Classic Dance in the 1950s and 1960s. Williams, a Katherine Dunham trainee, had been courted away from her dance studio in Brooklyn, New York, by President Paul Magloire around 1951 to start the school in Port-au-Prince which would train Gauthier along with other Haitian dance stalwarts such as Lynn Williams Rouzier and Régine Montrosier-Trouillot.

Gauthier describes the teaching style of the woman Haitians affectionately called Lavinia as emphasizing discipline in precision of movement, rigidity of the torso and adherence to proper dress-code. She founded the Viviane Gauthier Dance School at some point later down the line, and probably not in 1950 as alleged by some sources. Her dance school which taught children as young as 4 and adults was known as a ready supplier of dancers to most folkloric dance productions in Haiti. In addition to Haitian folkloric dance, the school offered training in ballet and modern dance techniques. Her studio was the oft-filmed and photographed veranda or her Victorian gingerbread house in Pétion-Ville, a suburb or Port-au-Prince. She performed for the first time in Europe at the age of 53.

== Views ==
Gauthier believed that the Yanvalou dance was the basis of all of the other Haitian dances and that it was the best form of exercise because it involved moving all parts of the body from head to toe. She worried that the authenticity of the Ibo dance was under threat. Although often credited as a choreographer she considered her vocation to be the preservation of Haitian dance. She drew a line between Haitian folkloric dance and Vodou, saying the two were not the same.

== Personal life ==
Viviane Gauthier never married or had children. She cherished her independence and did not believe her lifestyle as a researcher compatible with the life of a married woman of her time.
