= Jean-Guy White =

Canadian sculptor and puppet designer

Jean-Guy White is a Canadian sculptor and puppet designer/builder.

== Movie credits ==
- The Muppet Christmas Carol
- Muppet Treasure Island
- Muppet*Vision 3D
- Muppet Classic Theater

== Television credits ==
- Dinosaurs
- Fraggle Rock
- The Animal Show
- W.I.L.D.
- Wilbur
