= Jean-Léon Destiné =

Haitian-born American dancer and choreographer (1918–2013)

Jean- Léon Destiné
- Born: Jean-Léon Destiné; March 26, 1918; Saint-Marc, Haiti
- Died: January 22, 2013 (aged 94); Manhattan, New York
- Occupations: Dancer, choreographer
- Years active: 1940-2004
- Dancing career
- Former groups: Destiné Afro-Haitian Dance Company
- Dances: Slave Dance (1949)

Jean-Léon Destiné (March 26, 1918 – January 22, 2013) was a Haitian-born American dancer and choreographer. He was born in Saint-Marc and moved to the United States with the dance company of Lina Mathon-Blanchet in the early 1940s. He later studied at Howard University. His work, becoming well known in the 1940s, often addressed Haiti's history of resisting colonialism and slavery. He also danced with Katherine Dunham's company and founded a national dance company in Haiti in the late 1940s. Destiné is known as the father of Haitian professional dance.

== Early life ==
Destiné was born in Saint Marc, Haiti to middle-class parents. His father worked for the government and his mother was a seamstress. His parents divorced when he was a child and he moved with his mother to Port-au-Prince.

Destiné became interested in drumming and dancing at an early age. He also sang in Lina Mathon Blanchet's folkloric singing group as a young man.

== Career ==
In 1941 Destine came to the United States for the first time to dance with Fussman-Mathon's folkloric dance troupe at the National Folk Festival in Washington D.C. When Destine returned home to Haiti they assigned him to be a cultural ambassador for the Haitian government to educate people on Haitian art and dance to increase tourism in Haiti. He led his country's dance troupe known as La Troupe Folklorique Nationale and taught many people how to dance. He produced and choreographed some of the biggest Haitian dances in the United States.

In 1946 Destiné performed on Broadway in Katherine Dunham's production of Bal Negre until 1948. At the same time Destiné performed at parties for Langston Hughes. As a result of his prominence in New York City Destiné was able to create his own dance company, Destiné Afro-Haitian Dance Company. He went on to star in the film Witch Doctor which premiered in 1948. He also appeared at the New York City Opera in 1949 in Troubled Island.

In 1949 Destiné choreographed and danced his famous Slave Dance at 200 year anniversary of the founding of Port-au-Prince, the capital of Haiti. According to Polyne, "This routine interpreted the evolution of enslaved African descendants from the point of bondage to their physical and psychological emancipation. At the moment of rebellion, Destiné struggled with the chains that imprisoned him and eventually broke free, energetically dancing throughout the ballroom demonstrating the emergence of a revolution and the beginning of a free Black republic."

Destiné was also part of Jacob's Pillow Dance Festival. He began dancing and choreographing at Jacob's Pillow in 1949 with his first performance being Carnival Dance. Destiné would go on to perform and choreograph at Jacob's Pillow until 1970. He later returned in 2004 to direct the Cultural Traditions Program. His legacy lives on within the Jacob's Pillow Dance Festival.

Destiné was associated with the American Dance Festival when it was in residence at Connecticut College. He began working as an instructor in 1962, he was one of the first Black choreographers to work with the American Dance Festival. He choreographed and performed with his Haitian Dance Troupe and drummers Aphlonse Cimber and Eder Calvin on April 30, 1965, at the Frank Loomis Palmer Auditorium at Connecticut College in New London, Connecticut.

In the 1980s and 1990s Destiné taught at several places in the NYC area. The Clark Center and Lezly's Dance and Skate were just two of the places he taught at primarily teaching Haitian and African dance.

In 2003, Destiné reviewer a program at Symphony Space and he also performed in it.

== Style ==
Jean Léon Destiné took classes with Jean Price Mars at Bureau d'Ethnologie in Port-au-Prince. This school was important to Black and indigenous culture in Haiti, because it fought back against the assumptions and ideas that Black people were inferior to whites. It was at this school that Destiné learned the history of West African influence on Haiti, Vodou, and Haitian folklore. Jean Leon Destiné started to incorporate these styles into his dance, where he produced dances that pushed back against the dominant colonial ideas of his country. Jean Léon Destiné created his own style of what is known as "Haitian dance" today that infuses styles of West African and Vodou.

== Awards and honors ==
Destiné was a two time recipient of the Officier Honneur et Mérite for his contributions to Haitian arts and culture.

He also received awards for his role in Witch Doctor at the Venice and Edinburgh Film Festivals, which also received the first Omnibus.

== Choreography ==
- Haitian Dances (1949)
- Martinique (1950)
- Fantasie D'amour (1950)
- Creole Fantasie (1951)
- Initiation of the Hounsi (1951)
- Jaibo (1961)
- Village Festival (circa 1965)
- Creole Songs (circa 1965)
- Baptism of the Drum (circa 1965)
- Yoruba Bakas (circa 1965)
- Fantasie Musicale (circa 1965)
- Witch Doctor (circa 1965)
- Bal Champetre (circa 1965)
- Serenade Tropicale (circa 1965)
- Mazurka Creole (circa 1965)
- Spider Dancee (circa 1965)
- La Legende De L' Assotor (circa 1965)
