= Snow Angel (Värttinä album) =

Compilation album by Värttinä
- Released: June 7, 2005
- Recorded: ???
- Genre: Finnish folk music
- Length: ???
- Label: Indies Records
- Producer: ???

Värttinä chronology
iki (2003)	Snow Angel (2005)	Miero (2006)

Snow Angel is a compilation album of songs by the Finnish band Värttinä. It contains songs from earlier albums iki, 6.12, Ilmatar, Aitara and Seleniko. It was released in the Czech Republic in 2005 by Indies Records.

== Track listing ==
1. "Laiska"
2. Sepän poika"
3. "Morsian"
4. "Tumala"
5. "Pirsta"
6. "Aitara"
7. "Äijö"
8. "Milja"
9. "Potran korean"
10. "Lieto"
11. "Travuska"
12. "Käppee"
13. "Nahkaruoska"
14. "Lemmennosto"
15. "Fanfaari"
16. "Kylä vuotti uutta kuuta"
17. "Ukko lumi"
18. "Liigua"
19. "Laulutyttö"
20. "Vot i kaalina"

The first pressing of this album had "Outona omilla mailla" instead of "Laulutyttö" for the 19th track. This was corrected in subsequent pressings.
