= Ilmatar (disambiguation) =

Ilmatar is a virgin spirit of the air in The Kalevala.

Ilmatar may also refer to:

- 385 Ilmatar, a main-belt asteroid
- Ilmatar (album), a 2000 folk album
- MS Ilmatar, a cruise ship

== See also ==
- Ilmater
