= Gary Didier Perez =

Haitian singer-songwriter (1965–2025)

- Perez in 2017

Background information
- Born: 5 December 1965; Port-au-Prince, Haiti
- Died: 28 August 2025 (aged 59)
- Genres: Compas
- Occupation: Singer
- Years active: 1986–2025
- Formerly of: Zenglen, Ozone

Gary Didier Perez (Haitian Creole pronunciation: [ɡa.ɣi di.dje pe.ɣes]; 5 December 1965 – 28 August 2025) was a Haitian compas singer. Born in Port-au-Prince, he began his career in the late 1980s and became one of the first singers of the band Zenglen, performing alongside Brutus Dérissaint and Patrick Martino. In the early 1990s he created Ozone, further establishing his reputation during that decade.

Perez's repertoire included songs such as "Fidèl", "Tambou Nou", "Anba Latè", and "Kool Claudy". His powerful voice and stage presence contributed to his popularity during what is often regarded as the golden age of compas music.

== Career ==
In 1986, as part of the band Mizik Mizik, Perez took part in Mwen renmen Haïti, a competition organized by American Airlines, where the group's song "Pa kite li ale" placed seventh out of 309 entries. The track appeared on the album Farinay and introduced Perez to a wider audience.

In the late 1980s, Perez co-founded Zenglen with Brutus Dérissaint and Patrick Martinau. The group became part of the Port-au-Prince music scene and contributed to the development of modern compas. Perez sang on the group's first release, An nou alèz, which included "Fidèl," "Michaela," "Ou te mèt ale," "Tanbou Nou," "Trayizon," and "Kitem." The recordings were popular in Haiti and the Antilles and established him among the leading singers of his generation.

At the height of its success, Perez left Zenglen. He performed briefly with Mizik Mizik and declined an offer to join Boukman Eksperyans as a replacement for Eddy François. In the early 1990s, he formed Ozone, releasing the album Rache Pikan, which featured several of his best-known songs, several of which are regarded as part of the standard compas repertoire. These works combined dance rhythms with lyrical texts and contributed to his reputation as a composer and arranger. Internal difficulties and lack of financial backing limited the group's longevity.

After Ozone disbanded, Perez pursued a freelance career. He moved to the United States, first to Orlando and then New York, where he continued to perform and collaborate on projects. In Brooklyn, he established a recording studio on Flatlands Avenue and attempted to re-form Ozone, but changing musical trends curtailed the effort. During this period, he also worked outside music while maintaining an active presence as a performer.

In May 2012, The Haitian Times reported that Perez was preparing to release Vwayaje, his first solo album since performing with Ozone. The album, composed of 12 songs written by Perez, included collaborations with Haitian producers such as Richard Légende, Jocel Almeus, Youyou, and Glenny Benoit. Its title track, "Vwayaje", received airplay on Haitian radio prior to the album’s release.

== Illness and death ==
Perez suffered from diabetes and chronic kidney failure. In 2021, he revealed that he required regular dialysis. In October 2023, he underwent heart surgery, and in early 2025, he was hospitalized for eight days. He later underwent a partial amputation of his left foot and used a prosthesis. He launched a GoFundMe campaign to raise US$40,000 for medical costs.

Perez died in the United States on 28 August 2025, at the age of 59. His death was announced by Brutus Derissaint on the official page of Zenglen. Figures in the Haitian music industry, including Fabrice Rouzier, paid tribute to him on social media. Writing for Le National, Schultz Laurent Junior described Perez as one of the leading voices of compas in the 1990s and stated that his death marked the end of a chapter in the history of the genre.

== Albums ==
- Rache Pikan (1992)
