= Jou a Rive =

Studio album by Boukan Ginen
- Released: 1995
- Studio: Audiotek
- Genre: Mizik rasin
- Label: Xenophile
- Producer: Yvon Cinè

Boukan Ginen chronology
Jou a Rive (1995)	Rèv an Nou (1996)

Jou a Rive is the debut album by the Haitian band Boukan Ginen, released in 1995. It was originally released in Haiti in 1993. Most of the lyrics were sung in Creole. "Pale Pale W" had been voted Best Carnival Song at Haitian Carnival. The band supported the album with a North American tour.

== Production ==
Singer Eddy Francois and drummer Evens Seney had been members of Boukman Eksperyans. Produced by Yvon Cinè, the album's music was arranged by guitar player Jimmy Jean-Felix. Boukan Ginen included 10 members at the time of the recording. "Ede M Chante" is an a cappella song.

== Critical reception ==
Professional ratings
Review scores
Source	Rating
AllMusic	2/5 stars
DownBeat	4.5/5 stars
MusicHound World: The Essential Album Guide	5/5 stars
The Sydney Morning Herald	4/5 stars

The Chicago Reader stated that "Eddy Francois' Bob Marley-esque vocals, guitarist Vladimir 'Jimmy' Jean-Felix's psychedelic flourishes, and slices of straight-up reggae combine with the album's slick production and pop glosses to temper the Haitian ra-ra rhythms and voodoo chants with an overt crossover appeal." The Washington Post wrote that Francois "delivers the group's anthemic songs with the political/spiritual fervor of a Bob Marley... Seney and his four fellow drummers organize their patterns around a definite groove, and the gifted Jimmy Jean-Felix adds North American rock guitar licks."

The Gazette noted that "the very fact that Boukman Eksperyans and Boukan Ginen invoke more dangerous voodoo and rara rock rhythms is a defiant political statement... Their lyrics merely fan the flames." Guitar Player thought that the album "presents their driving, effervescent blend of folkloric Haitian trance rhythms with rock, R&B, and reggae, all arranged by Jean-Felix." The Chicago Tribune determined that, "in places, Boukan Ginen seems to be practically folksy even as it infuses its hypercharged vodoun celebrations with scorching guitar licks and near-solid walls of percussion."

AllMusic wrote that "BG's mix of rock and funk and compas and rara-derived rhythms is much hipper and less self-conscious than [Boukman Eksperyans's]."

== Track listing ==
No.	Title	Length
1.	"Nati Kongo"
2.	"Nèg Anwo"
3.	"Jou a Rive"
4.	"Ede M Chante"
5.	"Pale Pale W"
6.	"Tande"
7.	"Sa Rèd"
8.	"Lib"
9.	"Travay"
10.	"An n Ale Wè"
11.	"Boukan Tou Limin"
