= Iki =

IKI may refer to:

- Internationales Kulturinstitut, in Vienna
- Iodine potassium-iodide, a chemical compound
- Russian Space Research Institute, originally known as IKI RAN
- Iki Airport, IATA code

Iki or iki may refer to:

- Iki Island, a Japanese island between the island of Kyūshū and the Tsushima islands in the Tsushima Strait
- Iki, Nagasaki, a city on Iki Island
- Iki Province, a former province of Japan, now part of Nagasaki Prefecture
- Iki (aesthetics), a Japanese aesthetical concept
- iki (Värttinä album), 2003
- Iki (Hitorie album), 2016
- Japanese ship Iki, various ships of the Japanese Navy
- A name of a chain of supermarkets in Lithuania operated by IKI Lietuva
