= Oi Dai =

Studio album by Värttinä
- Released: 1991
- Recorded: Finnvox-Studio, Helsinki 1991
- Genre: Finnish folk music
- Length: 34:25
- Label: Spirit/Polygram
- Producer: Riku Mattila

Värttinä chronology
Musta Lindu (1990)	Oi Dai (1991)	Seleniko (1992)

Oi Dai is Värttinä's 3rd album, and the first after they re-formed in 1990 after losing many members. It was released in 1991 in Finland by Spirit/Polygram. It was a great success, and led to Värttinä touring throughout Europe. In 1994, it was released in the United States by Xenophile Records. It was later re-released in the US by NorthSide.

== Track listing ==
1. "Marilaulu" (traditional, arranged by Värttinä) – 2:08
2. "Mie oon musta" (trad., arr. Värttinä) – 2:17
3. "Viikon vaivane" (traditional/S. Kaasinen, arr. Värttinä) – 4:23
4. "Kamaritski" (trad., arr. Värttinä) – 2:15
5. "Miinan laulu" (trad., arr. Värttinä) – 3:13
6. "Ukko lumi" (trad., arr. Värttinä) – 2:09
7. "Vot vot ja niin niin" (trad., arr. Värttinä) – 2:41
8. "Tupa täynnä tuppasuita" (trad., arr. Värttinä) – 2:34
9. "Oi dai" (trad., arr. Värttinä) – 3:43
10. "Tantsukolena" (trad., arr. Värttinä) – 2:07
11. "Kiiriminna" – 2:43
12. "Yks on huoli" (traditional/S. Kaasinen, arr. Värttinä) – 4:07

== Personnel ==
- Mari Kaasinen – vocals
- Sari Kaasinen – vocals, kantele, 2-row accordion
- Kirsi Kähkönen – vocals
- Sirpa Reiman – vocals
- Minna Rautiainen – vocals
- Christer Hackman – percussion
- Janne Lappalainen – wind instruments
- Tom Nyman – bass
- Riitta Potinoja – accordion
- Kari Reiman – fiddle
- Tommi Viksten – guitar, mandola
