= Son Egal =

Studio album by Tarika
- Released: 1997
- Label: Xenophile
- Producer: Simon Emmerson, Martin Russell

Tarika chronology
Bibiango (1994)	Son Egal (1997)	D (1999)

Son Egal is the second album by the Malagasy band Tarika, released in 1997. It was the band's first widely distributed album. Tarika promoted it with a two-month North American tour. Son Egal was a hit in Madagascar, as well as on American and European world music charts.

Sonegaly is the Malagasy word for Senegal. The title is also French for equal sound.

== Production ==
Son Egal was produced by Simon Emmerson and Martin Russell. It is a loose concept album about the Malagasy Uprising—where French colonists used Senegalese (and other African) forces to violently put down an uprising—that began 50 years prior to the album's release. Tarika worked with Senegalese musicians, some from Baaba Maal's band. Prior to recording the album, Hanitra, the band's frontwoman, spent time listening to Malagasy survivors of the violence; many survivors of torture were eager for rectification and understanding. Hanitra wanted to improve relations with Senegal by acknowledging that the French colonial-trained forces were made up of soldiers from many African nations. The band used valihas, koras, and tamas on the album; several songs employed the harmonies of sisters Hanitra and Noro.

Many songs criticize the Malagasy politics of the 1990s, as well as global perceptions of Madagascar. "Avelo" alludes to the problem of grave robbing in Madagascar. "Diso Be" references the 1947 uprising and the 1897 exile of Queen Ranavalona III. "Aza Misy Miteniteny" was written by revolutionary students of the 1970s.

== Critical reception ==
Professional ratings
Review scores
Source	Rating
AllMusic	4/5 stars
Dayton Daily News	3/4 stars
The Encyclopedia of Popular Music	4/5 stars
MusicHound World: The Essential Album Guide	5/5 stars

Robert Christgau liked the album but debated whether its sound was "chirpy or ebullient." The Washington Post deemed it "a high-energy Afro-pop outing." The Guardian considered Son Egal "a typically exuberant dance set but also a brave and original political diatribe which contrasts the island's colonial past with modern-day racism and corruption."

SF Weekly called the album "a vibrant, sweeping condemnation of the political corruption eating away at the island of Madagascar." JazzTimes labeled it "political music with a seductive pulse and surface, a fascinating project," writing that "the group masterfully blends indigenous Malagassy music with modern notions, and in this case, arranges a collaboration with Senegalese musicians." The Dayton Daily News praised the "soaring harmonies [and] speed-plucking guitar work."

AllMusic wrote that, "like other Tarika efforts, Son Egal has a strong sociopolitical bent ... it's clear that Tarika is a melodic powerhouse."

== Track listing ==
No.	Title	Length
1.	"Tsy Kivy"
2.	"Avelo"
3.	"Voandalana"
4.	"Zotra"
5.	"Sonegaly"
6.	"Rafrancois"
7.	"Vavaka"
8.	"Ady"
9.	"Sento"
10.	"Raha Tiany"
11.	"Forever"
12.	"Diso Be"
13.	"Aza Misy Miteniteny"
