= Värttinä (album) =

Studio album by Värttinä
- Released: 1987
- Recorded: Rääkkylä, North Karelia April 1987
- Genre: Karelian folk music
- Length: 41:24
- Label: self-released
- Producer: Värttinä

Värttinä chronology
Värttinä (1987)	Musta Lindu (1989)

Värttinä is self-titled debut album by Finnish folk music group Värttinä. On this album, the 21-member band performs traditional Karelian folk songs. It was originally self-released in 1987 on vinyl and cassette. In 1992, it was re-released in Finland by Mipu Music. In 1997 it was reissued in Japan by Warner Japan. In the same year, it was reissued in the United States by Finlandia Innovators, under the title Värttinä - The First Album.

== Track listing ==
1. "Ruskie neitsyt" ("Brown-haired Maiden") – 2:19
2. "Mainitus" ("Mainitus Dance") – 1:35
3. "Lehmän tanssi" ("Cow's Dance") – 4:03
4. "Miss' on miun armahin" ("Where Is My Beloved") – 3:57
5. "Mie tahon tasaista miestä" ("I Want A Steady Man") – 1:18
6. "Juhon kontra" ("Juho's Contradance") – 1:34
7. "Tutskovin polska" ("Tutskov's Polska") – 1:53
8. "Suojärven katrilli" ("Suojärvi Quadrille") – 2:25
9. "Karjalainen kehtolaulu" ("Lullaby from Karelia") – 4:05
10. "Varrii ompi zaijuvesj" ("The Tea-water is Hot") – 2:08
11. "Koiviston polska" ("Koivisto Polska") – 1:35
12. "Duetto" ("Duet") – 1:35
13. "Melkutus" ("Melkutus Dance") – 1:43
14. "Sade" ("Rain") – 3:25
15. "Tsiiputus" ("Tsiiputus Dance") – 1:25
16. "Sekatyylipolkka" ("Polka in Mixed Style") – 2:19
17. "Ompa tietty tietyssäni" ("I Am Thinking of A Particular One") – 3:31

In the Japanese release, "Ruskie neitsyt" was moved from track 1 to track 15, after "Tsiiputus".
