= Live in Helsinki =

Live in Helsinki may refer to:

- 6.12., a 2001 album by Värttinä, known as Live in Helsinki in the United States
- Live in Helsinki (Zu album), 2003
