= Susan Aho =

Finnish folk singer (born 1974)

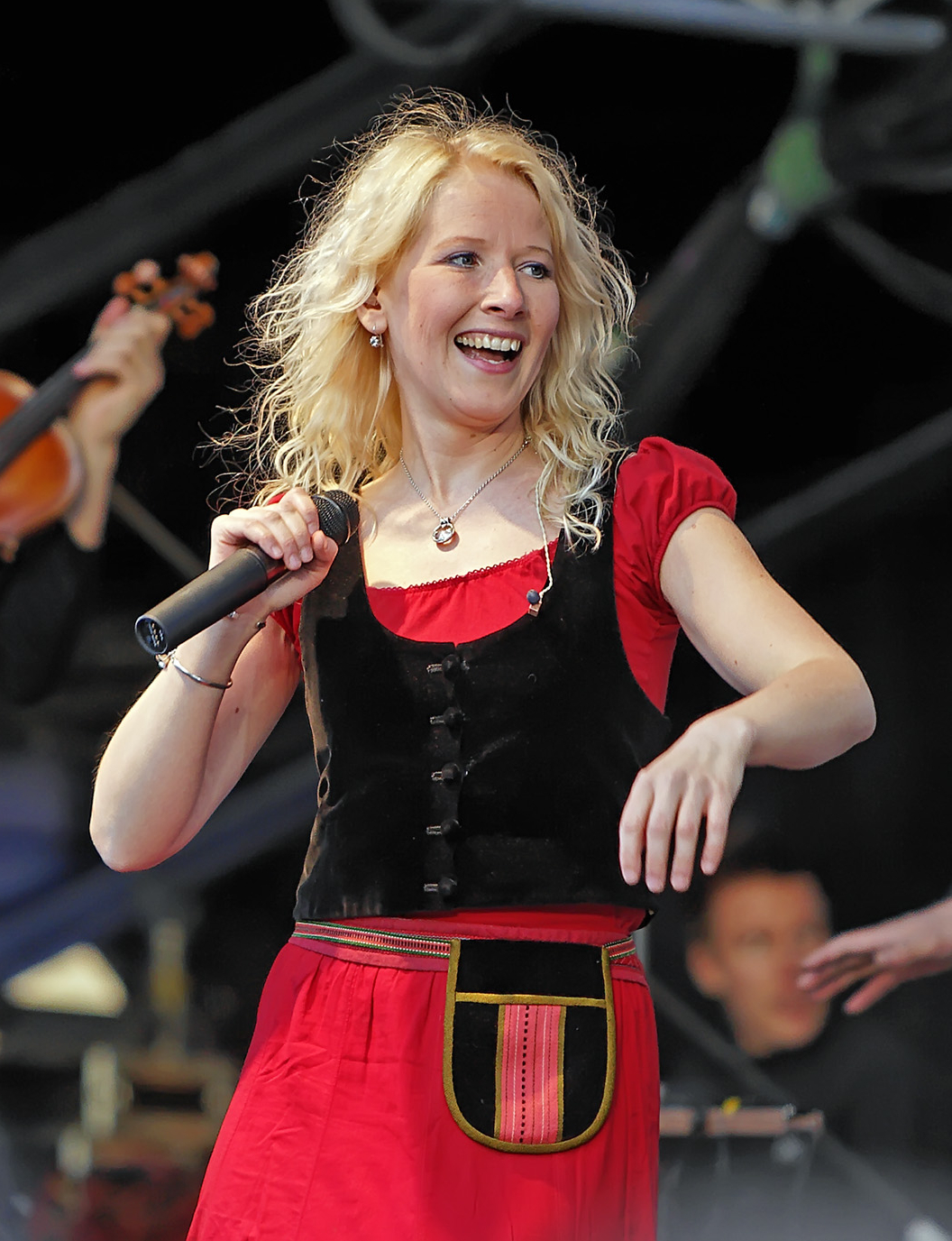
- Susan Aho live, 2007

Background information
- Birth name: Susan Aho
- Born: 5 March 1974 (age 51); Espoo, southern Finland
- Origin: Finland
- Genres: Folk music
- Occupation: Singer
- Instrument: Accordion
- Years active: 1995–present
- Labels: Nonesuch, Elektra, Real World
- Member of: Värttinä
- Website: www.varttina.com

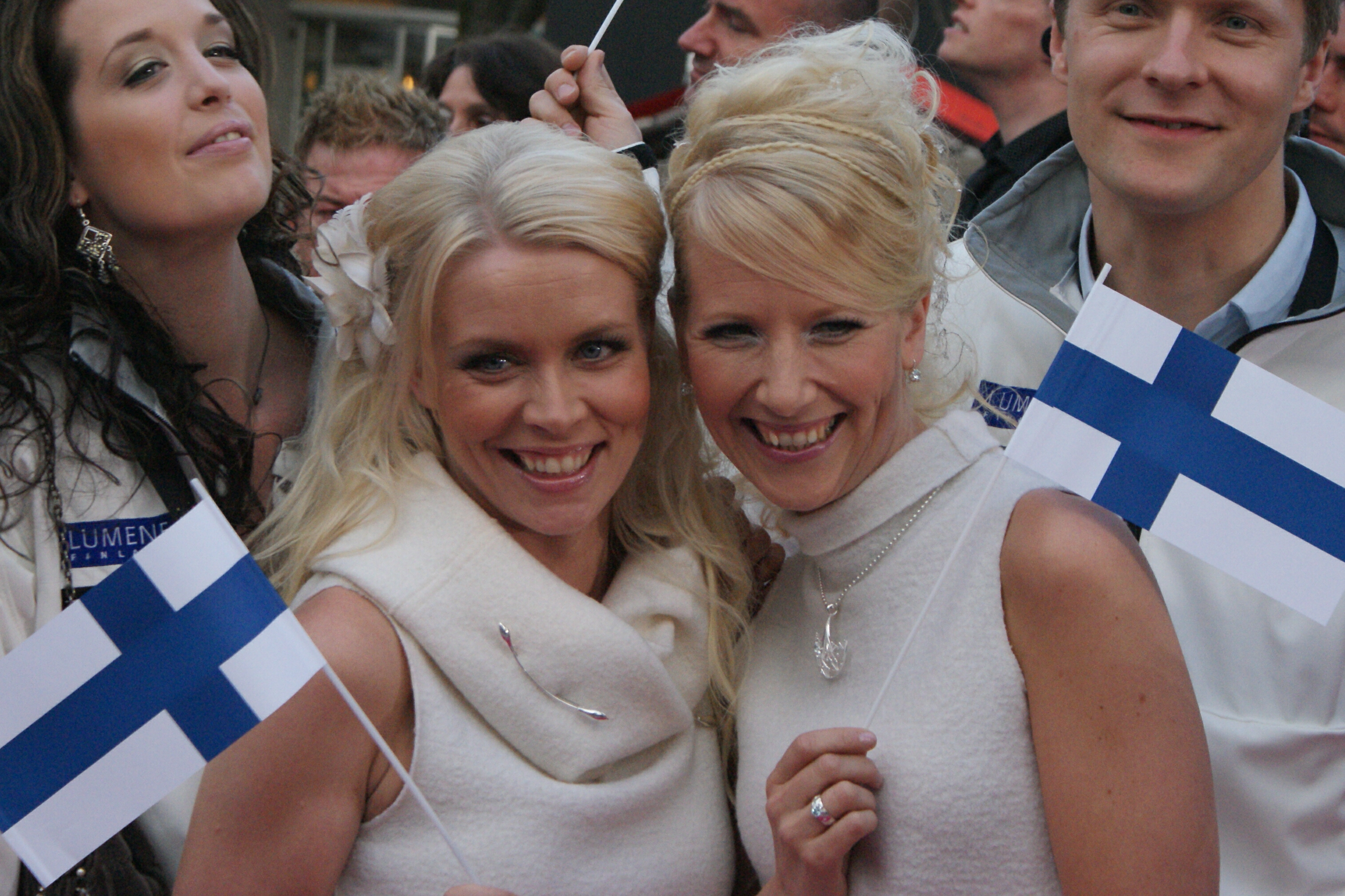
Susan Aho and Johanna Virtanen at the 2010 Eurovision Opening Party in Oslo

Susan Aho (born 5 March 1974) is a Finnish folk music singer-songwriter and a member of the band Värttinä. In 2010, she represented Finland in the Eurovision Song Contest 2010 as part of the duo Kuunkuiskaajat.

== Biography ==
Susan Aho was born in Espoo, in Southern Finland, near the capital Helsinki.

Having played the accordion since she was 13, Aho joined Värttinä in 1998, replacing Riitta Kossi, and was the accordionist and a vocalist on their album Vihma. By the next album, Ilmatar (2001), she confined herself to singing, having been replaced as accordionist by Markku Lepistö.

Aho studies at the Sibelius Academy in Helsinki and is involved in a variety of other projects besides Värttinä. For example, she was vocalist and accordionist in the Greek group Odysseia, was a member of the folk band Metsänväki, and with the Finnish accordionist Minna Luoma played Finnish gypsy songs in the group Rotunaiset. Since 1998 she has been a member of the Balkan-Finnish group Vaeltajat, with whom she also sings and plays accordion.

Aho also works with the Nukketeatteri Sampo (Sampo Puppet Theatre, founded in 1977) in Helsinki; the interplay of traditional puppet theatre with music and poetry plays a big role in its work.

She founded the duo Kuunkuiskaajat with Johanna Virtanen in 2008. In 2010 they won the Finnish trials for that year's Eurovision Song Contest with the song "Työlki ellää", but did not qualify for the final. In 2011 Aho read the Finnish scoring for the 56th Eurovision Song Contest in Düsseldorf.

== Discography (with Värttinä) ==
- 1998 Vihma
- 2000 Ilmatar (various re-releases 2001)
- 2001: 6.12. (live album)
- 2002: Live in Helsinki (= 6.12. ), Double Life (2-CD compilation)
- 2003: Iki
- 2005: Snow Angel (compilation, released only in the Czech Republic); with Värttinä on Simon Ho: Simon Ho
- 2006: Miero; with Värttinä on: Ho Orchestra: A normal Sunday (live CD); Archive Live (DVD)
- 2007: 25 (compilation including songs from every Värttinä album)
- 2008: Kuunkuiskaajat – Kuunkuiskaajat
- 2012: Utu
