= Äijö =

Äijö may refer to:

- Äijö, a name of the supreme god (Ukko) in Finnish mythology, more often used when he is portrayed in an evil way or as the Devil
- "Äijö" (song), a song by the Finnish folk music group Värttinä
