= Seleniko =

Studio album by Värttinä
- Released: 1992
- Recorded: 1992
- Studio: Finnvox-Studio, Helsinki
- Genre: Finnish folk music
- Length: 47:22
- Label: Polygram Finland, Spirit, Music & Words, Xenophile, NorthSide
- Producer: Hijaz Mustapha

Värttinä chronology
Oi Dai (1991)	Seleniko (1992)	Aitara (1994)

Professional ratings
Review scores
Source	Rating
Green Man Review	favorable Late 1999

Seleniko is the fourth album by Finnish folk group Värttinä, and second after they re-formed in 1990, released in Finland by Spirit and Polygram Finland in 1992. It immediately reached the top of the European World Music radio charts, and remained there for 3 months. In 1993, it was released by Music & Words in Benelux and Xenophile Records in the United States. NorthSide re-released the album in 1998 in the United States.

The song "Matalii ja mustii" was featured on the episode "Binky Rules/Meet Binky" of the children's show Arthur in the United States, and also appears on the first Arthur soundtrack.

== Track listing ==
1. "Seelinnikoi" (music: tradition, lyrics: Sari Kaasinen, arrangement: Janne Lappalainen, Tom Nyman, Riitta Potnoja, Kari Reiman) – 3:40
2. "Lemmennosto" / "Awakening of Love" (music & lyrics: S. Kaasinen, arr.: Nyman, Reiman, Tommi Viksten) – 2:53
3. "Kylä vuotti uutta kuuta" / "The Village Awaits the New Moon" (music & lyrics: trad., arr.: S. Kassinen, Lappalainen, Nyman, Reiman) – 5:08
4. "Sulhassii" / "Bride Grooms" (music: trad., lyrics & arr.: S. Kaasinen) – 2:55
5. "Matalii ja mustii" / "Sad and Mournful" or "Short and Black" (music & lyrics: trad. arr.: Nyman, Reiman, Viksten) – 2:57
6. "Hoptsoi" (music: Reiman, arr.: Reijo Heiskanen, Laapaleinen, Nyman, Reiman) – 3:21
7. "Suuret ja soriat" / "Tall and Handsome" (music: Reiman, lyrics: Reiman/trad., arr.: Nyman, Reiman) – 3:42
8. "Leppiäinen" / "Gentle as Alder" (music: Reiman/trad., lyrics: S. Kaasinen/trad., arr.: S. Kaasinen, Lappalainen, Reiman) – 2:45
9. "Pihi neito" / "Stingy Girl" (music: trad., lyrics: S. Kaasinen, arr.: Lappalainen, Nyman, Reiman) – 2:41
10. "Mika miulla mielessa" / "What's on my mind?" (music: trad., lyrics: S. Kaasinen, arr.: S. Kaasinen, Lappalainen, Nyman, Reiman) – 3:38
11. "Kiirama" (music: Reiman, arr.: Heiskanen, Lappalainen, Nyman, Potinoja, Reiman) – 3:36
12. "Hyvä tyttönä hypätä" / "Good to Stay a Single Girl" (music: trad., lyrics: S. Kaasinen, arr.: Heiskanen, S. Kaasinen, Lappalainen, Nyman, Potinoja, Reiman) – 3:45
13. "Fanfaari" / "Fanfare" (music: trad., lyrics & arr.: S. Kaasinen) – 2:16
14. "Paukkuvat pasuunat" / "Thundering Trumpets" (music: trad., lyrics: S. Kaasinen, arr.: S. Kaasinen, Lappalainen, Nyman, Reiman) – 4:02

== Personnel ==
=== Värttinä ===
- Mari Kaasinen - vocals
- Sari Kaasinen - vocals
- Kirsi Kähkönen - vocals
- Sirpa Reiman - vocals
- Reijo Heiskanen - guitar, bouzouki (track 7), percussion (1,3)
- Janne Lappalainen - bouzouki, soprano saxophone, tenor saxophone, kaval, tin whistle
- Tom Nyman - string bass, keyboard (3, 14), domra
- Riitta Potinoja - 5-row accordion, keyboard (11)
- Kari Reiman - fiddle, kantele, tenor banjo

=== Guests ===
- Janne Haavisto - percussion (8)
- Anu Laakkonen - trumpet
- Tom Nekljudow - percussion

== Singles ==
=== Kylä Vuotti Uutta Kuuta, Seelinnikoi ===
A single containing "Kylä Vuotti Uutta Kuuta" and "Seelinnikoi" from this album was released in 1992 in Finland by Polygram.

=== Pihi Neito, Matalii ja Mustii ===
In 1993, a second single from this album, containing "Pihi Neito" and "Matalii ja Mustii", was released by PolyGram in Finland.
