= Tarika (musical group) =

- Origin: Madagascar
- Genres: World music, Malagasy roots music
- Instruments: marovany, valiha, kabosy, jejy voatavo
- Years active: 1993-present
- Label: Xenophile
- Members: Hanitra (Rasoanaivo Hanitrarivo); Noro (Raharimalala Tina Norosoa); Donné (Randriamanantena Dieudonné); Ny Ony (Rasolomahatratra); Ny Ony (Henintsoa Andriamparany); Solo (Randrianasolomalala Victor)
- Website: www.Frootsmag.com/Tarika

Tarika (Malagasy for "group") is a musical group from Madagascar. The group's predecessor, Tarika Sammy, formed in the 1980s, but as Tarika they debuted in 1993. At that point they had relocated to London. Their second album Son Egal was a collaboration with Senegal musicians and dealt with the 1947 Malagasy Uprising in Madagascar. Otherwise, much of Tarika's music is based on musical tradition; for example, the album D focused on dance music. Their 2001 album Soul Makassar dealt with the musical connections between Indonesia and Madagascar.

Tarika is led by two sisters, Hanitra and Noro. Hanitra has engaged in creating an arts centre in recent years. In 2001, TIME magazine included Tarika in a list of the "10 best bands on planet Earth".

== Discography ==
Albums

- Bibiango (1994)
- Son Egal (1997)
- D (1999)
- Soul Makassar (2001)
- Tarika: 10 - Beasts, Ghosts & Dancing with History (2004 - tenth anniversary compilation CD)

Contributing artist

- The Rough Guide to World Music (1994, World Music Network)
- Unwired: Africa (2000, World Music Network)
