= Baltic Finnic creation myths =

Baltic Finnic creation myths (Finnish: maailmansynty, luomisruno; Estonian: loomine) are the myths among Baltic Finnic peoples which describe the origin of the world. These include myths that feature the cosmic egg and earth diver themes.

According to Anna-Leena Siikala, researchers have mainly focused on the creation myths connected to male heroes, and the more feminine southern island creation version has been forgotten. The one featured in the epic Kalevala is of the northern style of Baltic Finnic creation myth; However, Elias Lönnrot believed there had originally been a deity involved instead of Väinämöinen, and replaced him with Ilmatar, who does not appear as such in the actual mythology.

== Northern versions ==
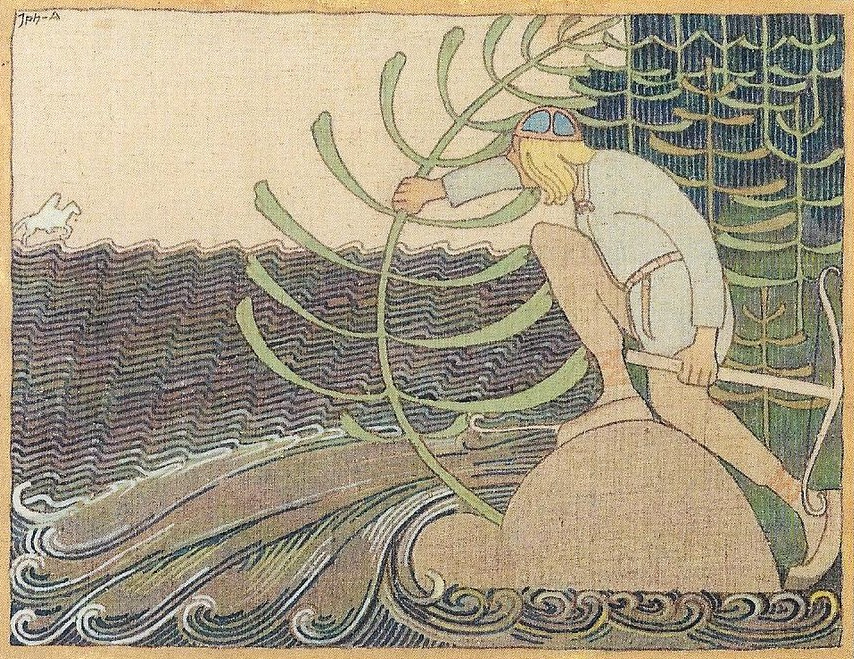
Joukahainen preparing to shoot Väinämöinen. "Revenge of Joukahainen" by Joseph Alanen (1919–1920).

The northern versions are known mainly from Karelia. It was also known in inland Finland but had become partially forgotten and fragmented by the 19th century. In this version, Joukahainen shoots down Väinämöinen's horse, causing Väinämöinen to fall into the sea. He lies there for a long time, until a waterfowl lays three eggs on Väinämöinen's knee, which was above surface. Väinämöinen thought his knee was burning and moved it, which caused the eggs to fall and break. The yolk became the Sun, the white became the moon, and the crumbs of the shell became the stars. Another runic song says the top part of an egg became the sky and the bottom part, earth.

The bird in question could be, depending on the runic song, a common goldeneye, a kokko bird, or a goose. Outside of Karelia, in Kainuu, the bird is a wigeon.

== Southern versions ==
The southern version which is called by researchers Saaren luominen 'Island creation' is known from South Savo, Ingria and Finnish Karelia.

In one Ingrian version, a swallow is looking for a place to lay eggs and finds three tufts, laying one egg on each (a blue one, a red one, and a yellow one). However, Ukko's wind raises waves which push the eggs into the water. The swallow asks Ilmarinen to forge an iron rake, and with it, the swallow gathers up the pieces of the eggs. The yolk becomes the moon, the white becomes the sun, and the yellow egg becomes the clouds.

In another island creation myth, a swallow is looking for a place to lay eggs and spots a boat. It makes an iron nest and lays a golden egg. Wind sweeps the egg into the sea, it breaks, and from it comes a beautiful island. Beautiful grass grows on the island and a beautiful maiden emerges from the grass. This maiden has been dubbed by researchers Nurmen neito 'Maiden of Grass'. This story can continue in multiple ways. In one version, the maiden gives birth to one or many sons to fight in wars. In another, likely later version, many men try to propose to her, but she refuses. Eventually, she is taken by Nurmi-Tuomas 'Grass Thomas', aka Death.

A different variation of the beginning of Nurmen neito myth is known from South Savo, Ingria and South Karelia (including the Karelian Isthmus). The singer plays a horn which Ilmarinen hears and twitches when he has gold boiling in his kettle in the middle of the sea. A drop of gold spills, and where it lands, an island emerges and on the island, Nurmen neito.

Some South Savonian poems also have a different ending, connecting Nurmen neito to a character called Iivana Kojosenpoika 'Ivan, son of Kojo/Kojonen'. While many men propose to Nurmen neito, Iivana Kojosenpoika snatches her into his sleigh. The maiden cries, for Iivana is so cruel, it would be better for her to be devoured by wolves and bears than be in Iivana's sleigh. Iivana kills and dismembers her with his sword. He bakes her breasts into cakes and feeds them to the maiden's mother. The mother doesn't know what the cakes are made of until a slave tells her after being promised a cow, a stallion and the woman's only son. After hearing the truth, the mother begins to cry.

Estonian songs show connections to the Nurmen neito myths. One song describes the center of the world: there is an island, on the center of the island is a well, in the center of the well is sammas (the world pillar), at the end of the sammas is a sifter, at the bottom of the sifter is a maiden, and under the maiden's apron is a son. Some Estonian songs also say that at the center is an oak tree (the world tree). This oak element also exists in Western Finnish songs.

Another Estonian version describes how litter is swept into the sea and an apple tree grows from them. Wind takes its fruits to the sea, when a grey bird emerges and lays eggs. When they hatch, the celestian lights are born from the chicks.

== Third version ==
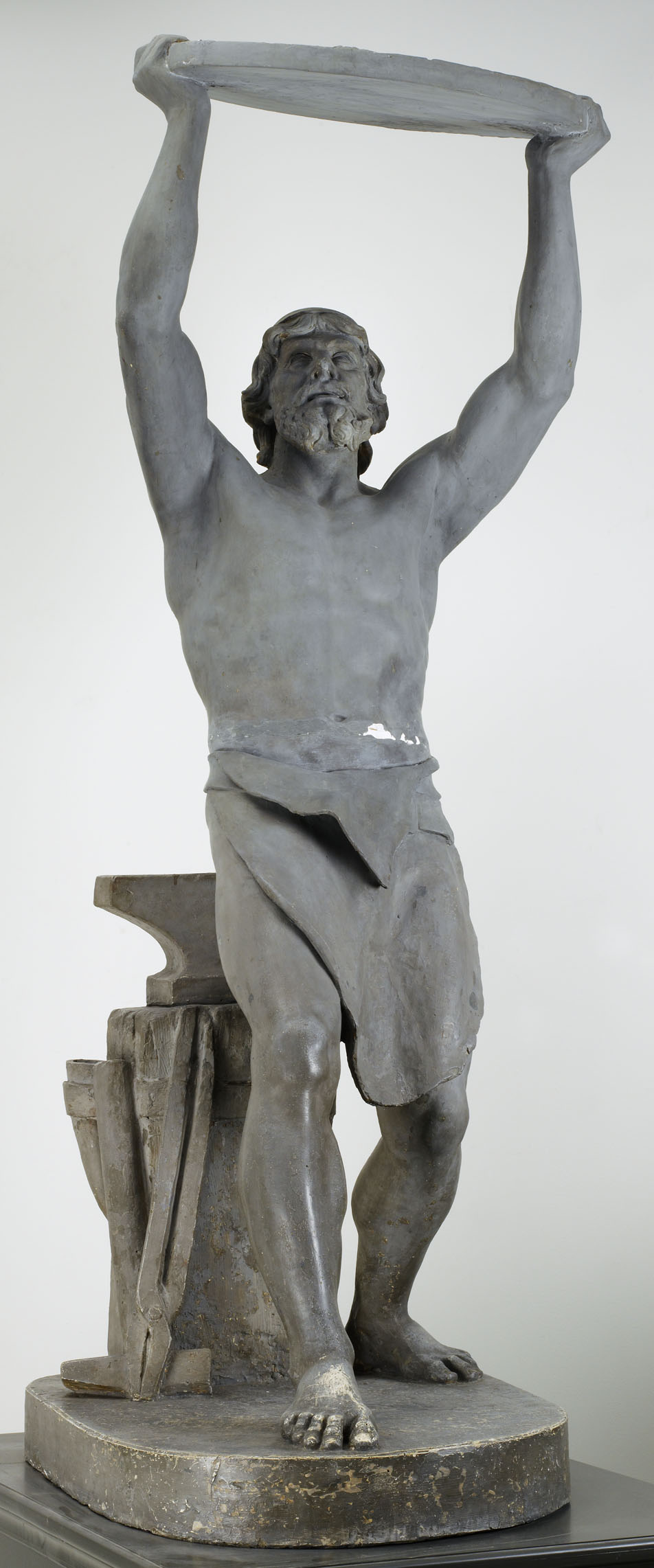
"Ilmarinen Forging the Moon" by Walter Runeberg (1866).

Runic songs from South Savo, North Ostrobothnia and Karelia also mention Ilmarinen as the one who forged the sky in a door-less and window-less forge. In this context, Christfried Ganander connected the forger with Jumala, saying that even back in pagan times, Finns had a concept of the "creator of everything". This version was born during the Iron Age, which in Finland spanned from c. 500 BCE to 1300 CE.

== Research ==
It is thought that the earth diver creation myth, which is commonly known among Northern Eurasian peoples, was the original one for Baltic Finns as well. However, the more southern cosmic egg myth largely took over, although the primordial sea and bird are features from the earth diver myth.

According to Pentti Aalto, the cosmic egg and bird theme comes from Proto-Aryan era. The Komi people also have a creation myth which includes a primordial sea and the world being born from eggs.

== Sources ==
- Pulkkinen, Risto; Lindfors, Stina (2016). Suomalaisen kansanuskon sanakirja. Tallinn: Gaudeamus. ISBN 978-952-495-405-1
- Siikala, Anna-Leena (2012). Itämerensuomalaisten mytologia. Helsinki: Finnish Literature Society. ISBN 978-952-222-393-7
