= Vodou Adjae =

Studio album by Boukman Eksperyans
- Released: 1991
- Genre: World
- Label: Mango

Boukman Eksperyans chronology
Vodou Adjae (1991)	Kalfou Danjere (1992)

Vodou Adjae is the first album of the Haitian music group Boukman Eksperyans. It is distributed in the United States and Canada by Mango, a division of Island Records. All of the songs are in Haitian Creole.

AllMusic called Vodou Adjae an "exciting blend of traditional drum rhythms and modern Caribbean pop attack". The album was nominated for a Grammy Award in 1991. The song "Ké-M Pa Sote" was described as "the group’s most popular and controversial song" by the Miami Herald. It was banned from being broadcast, and it was used by supporters of Jean-Bertrand Aristide, Haiti's first democratically elected president, who was deposed by the military.

== Track listing ==
1. "Se Kreyól Nou Ye" (We're Creole)
2. "Nou La" (We're Here)
3. "Plante" (Plant!)
4. "Ké-M Pa Sote" (My Heart Doesn't Leap/I'm Not Afraid)
5. "Tribilasyon" (Tribulation)
6. "Nou Pap Sa Bliye" (We Cannot Forget)
7. "Wet Chen" (Get Angry, Break the Chains)
8. "Mizik A Manzé" (Song for a Woman)
9. "Mizeréré" (Misery Follows You)
10. "Malere" (Poor)
11. "Pwason Rat" (Rat Poison)
