= Vihma =

Studio album by Värttinä
- Released: 1998
- Recorded: April–May 1998, Finnvox, Hitsville and Kota Studios, Helsinki
- Genre: Finnish folk music
- Length: 47:11
- Label: Wicklow Entertainment
- Producer: Janne Haavisto and Richard Horowitz

Värttinä chronology
Kokko (1996)	Vihma (1998)	Ilmatar (2000)

Vihma is Värttinä's 7th album, released in 1998. It is primarily pop- and rock-influenced Finnish folk music. However, three tracks (6, 8 and 9) also include Tuvan throat singing.

Vihma was initially released by Wicklow Entertainment in the United States and Finland. Later in 1998, it was released in Japan by BMG Japan. In the same year, "Emoton" was released as a single in Finland.

== Track listing ==
1. "Vihma" – 4:04
2. "Tielle heitetty" – 2:56
3. "Emoton" – 3:32
4. "Päivän nousu nostajani" – 3:42
5. "Laulutyttö" – 3:32
6. "Uskottu ei uupuvani" – 5:05
7. "Maa ei kerro" – 3:01
8. "Kylän kävijä" – 4:01
9. "Mieleni alenevi" – 2:57
10. "Neitonen" – 2:56
11. "Aamu" – 4:40
12. "Kauan kulkenut" – 3:19
13. "Vihmax" ("Vihma" remix) – 3:32

== Personnel ==
=== Värttinä ===
- Susan Aho - vocals, 5-row accordion
- Mari Kaasinen - vocals
- Kirsi Kähkönen - vocals
- Janne Lappalainen - bouzouki, kaval, torupill, tenor & soprano saxophones
- Pekka Lehti - double bass
- Kari Reiman - fiddle, 10-string kantele, berimbau
- Sirpa Reiman - vocals
- Marko Timonen - drums, percussion
- Antto Varilo - acoustic 6- & 12-string guitars, tenor banjo, cümbüs tanbur, 10-string kantele

with Janne Haavisto - additional percussion

=== Guests ===
- Arto Järvelä, Mauno Järvelä, Matti Mäkelä of JPP - strings (track 6)
- Albert Kuvezin and Aldyn-ool Sevek of Yat-Kha - Tuvan throat singing (6, 9, 13)
- Richard Horowitz - keyboards (7, 13), Ney (13)
- Petri Prauda - Jew's harp (8)
