= Ilmatar =

Goddess in the Kalevala epic

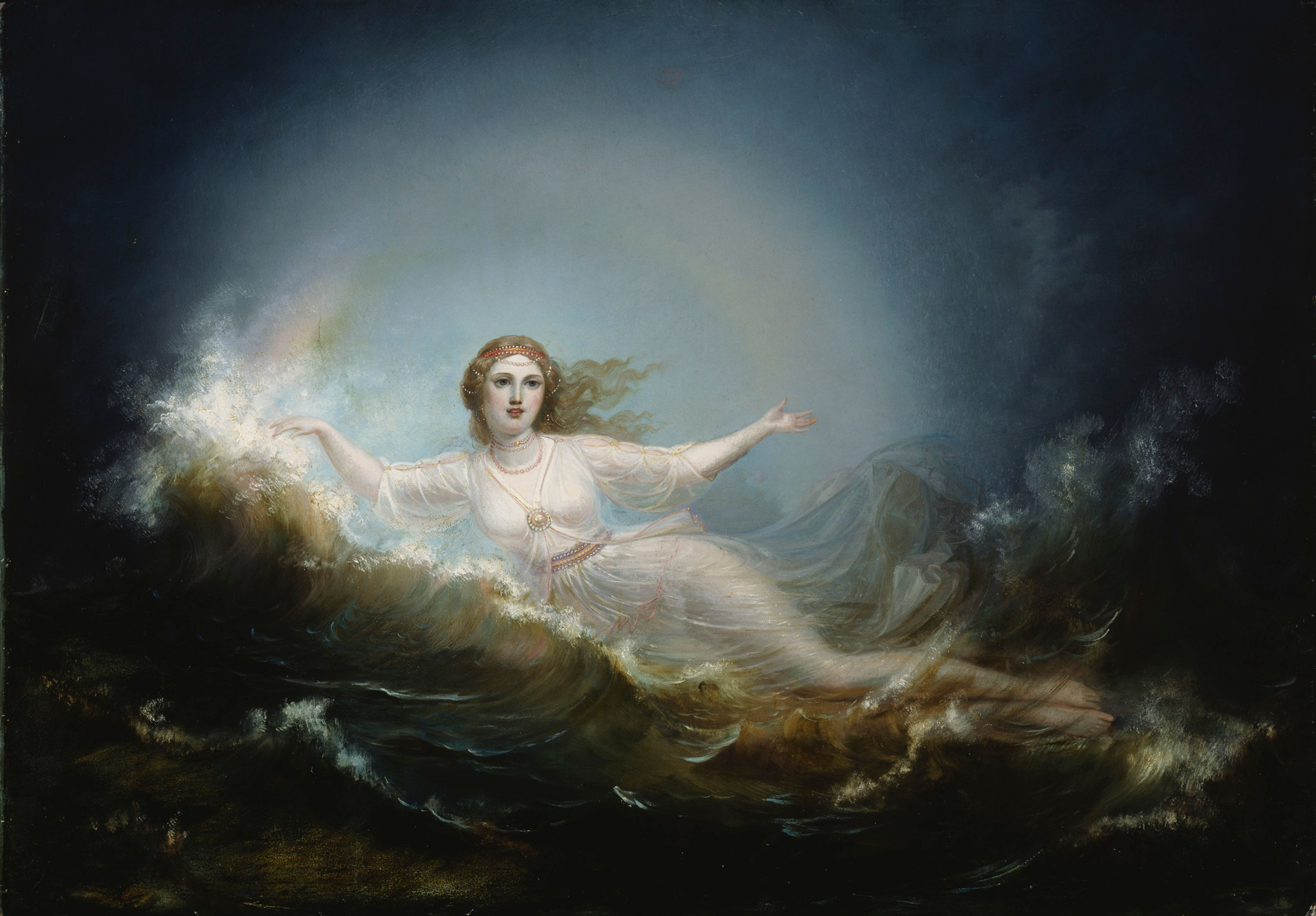
Ilmatar by Robert Wilhelm Ekman, 1860

Ilmatar (pronounced [ˈilmɑtɑr]) is a virgin spirit and goddess of the air in the Finnish national epic Kalevala.

== Origins ==
The name Ilmatar is derived from the Finnish word ilma, meaning "air," and the female suffix -tar, corresponding to the English "-ess". Thus, her name means Airess. In the Kalevala she was also occasionally called Luonnotar (Finnish pronunciation: [ˈluo̯nːo̞t̪ɑr]), which means "Naturess," "female spirit of nature" (Finnish luonto, "nature").

She was impregnated by the sea and wind and thus became the mother of Väinämöinen.

Ilmatar does not appear connected to the creation of the world in Finnish mythology. In runic songs, the name only appears in one collected White Karelian poem in reference to the oldest of women. In a rare Ostrobothnian runic song, it is said that the one who gave birth to Väinämöinen was the Maiden of North (Pohjan neito). This is the runic song basis for Lönnrot's Ilmatar as the feminine birther of the world. In Ladoga Karelia, the one who gives birth to Väinämöinen is either Iro (Saint Irene) or Maaria (Virgin Mary).

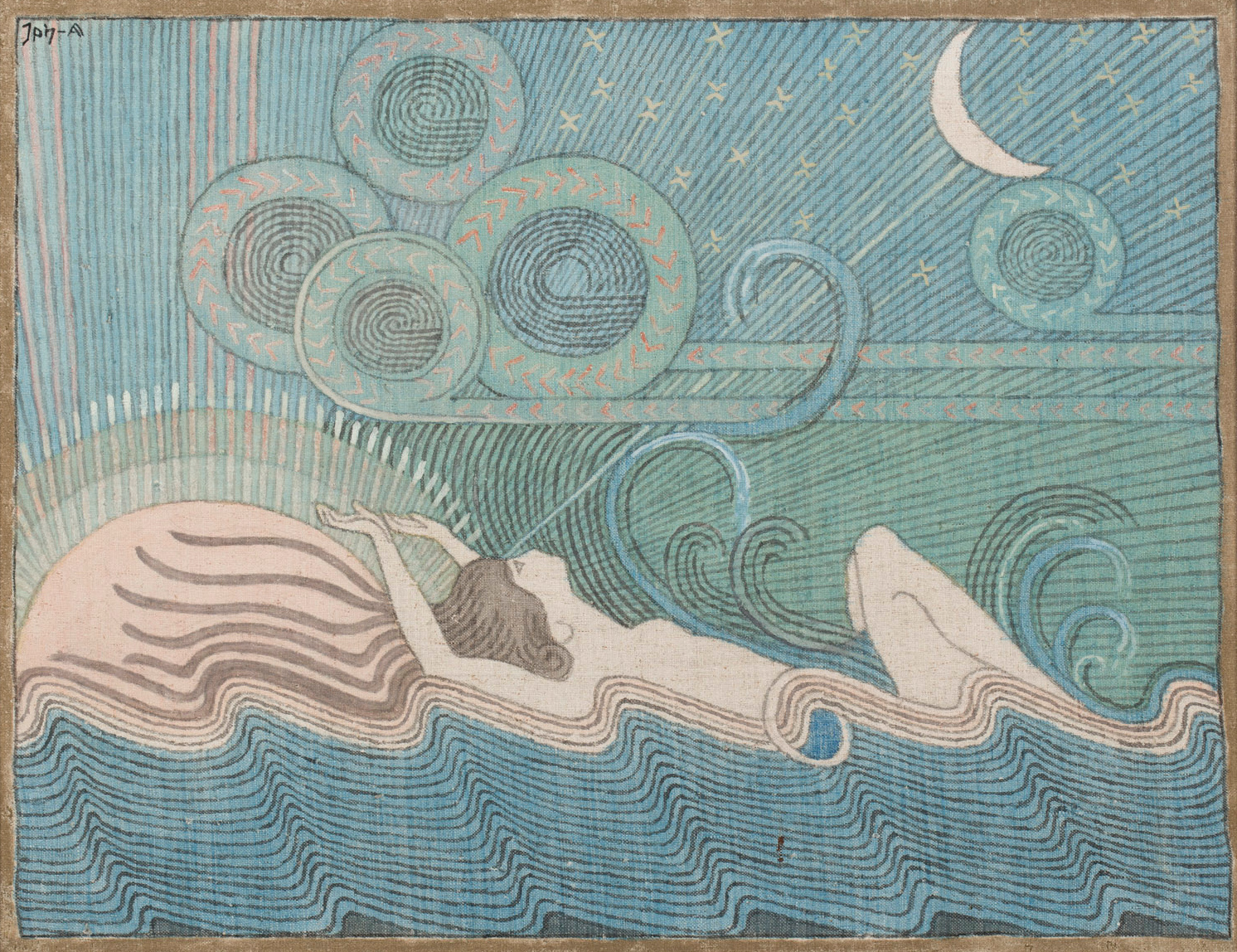
Ilmatar by Joseph Alanen, 1913–1916

== Sibelius’s Luonnotar ==
Jean Sibelius composed the Finnish epic tone poem Luonnotar, for soprano and orchestra in 1913. In this work, the mythical origin of the land and sky (recounted in verses from the Kalevala) becomes an intense Sibelian metaphor for the inexorable force of terror of all creation. Considered to be one of the composer's most compelling works, it alternates between two musical themes. As heard at the outset, these are the shimmering stirrings of ever-growing possibility; and, underpinned with dissonant, static, harp strokes, the even more incantatory, distressed cries of the "nature spirit" (Luonnotar) herself, heavy with child.

== Homage ==
- Ilmatar is an album by the Finnish band Värttinä, released in 2000. Its theme was inspired by the goddess's origin-story in the Kalevala and similar Finnish folk-lore and magic.
- The Main Belt asteroid 385 Ilmatar is named after the goddess.
- In the book The Quantum Thief, members of a humanoid race living in the Oort cloud sometimes pray to Kuutar and Ilmatar.
- Tales Eldelórne trilogy by Karleigh Bon, book one, introduces Ilmatar as the "womb of their gods, where immortal elves are reborn". 2014-2019
- One of the protagonists of the anime Strike Witches, Finnish aviator Eila Ilmatar Juutilainen, shares part of her name with that of the goddess.
- Two passenger liners of the now-defunct Finland Steamship Company were named after the goddess: the SS Ilmatar of 1929 and the MS Ilmatar of 1964.
