= Mimerose Beaubrun =

Haitian musician and writer

Mimerose P. "Manzè" Beaubrun (born November 13, 1956) is a Haitian musician and writer.

Born Mimerose Pierre in Ouanaminthe, she received a diploma in Social and Cultural Anthropology from the Université d'État d'Haiti. Beaubrun is one of the lead singers and a founding member of the rasin band Boukman Eksperyans. She is married to another founding member, Theodore Beaubrun, a member of a notable family of Haitian entertainers. The couple have two children: Laura and Paul.

She promotes Haitian culture, including Haitian Vodou, and has extensively researched the system of communal living known as lakou. Beaubrun is a mambo, or Vodou priestess.

She is the author of Nan Dòmi, récit d'une initiation vodou (2011), translated into English as Nan Dòmi: An Initiate’s Journey into Haitian Vodou (2013). She is also co-author of the 1998 book Livre ouvert sur le développement endogène d’Haïti, translated into English as Open Book on the Endogenous Development of Haiti.
