= Miero =

Studio album by Värttinä
- Released: January 30, 2006
- Recorded: August 2005
- Studios: Finnvox and Hitsville Studios, Helsinki
- Genre: Finnish folk music
- Length: 47:48
- Label: Real World Records
- Producer: Aija Puurtinen

Värttinä chronology
Snow Angel (2005)	Miero (2006)

Professional ratings
Review scores
Source	Rating
BBC	(extremely favourable)
The Guardian	(favourable)
Daily Telegraph	(favourable)

Miero ("Outcast") is Värttinä's 13th album (10th studio album).

== Track listing ==
1. "Riena / Anathema" (music: Antto Varilo, lyrics: Maari Kaasinen, Johanna Virtanen) – 3:30
2. "Valhe / The Lie" (music: Lassi Logrén, lyrics: Susan Aho) – 4:47
3. "Mataleena" (music: Janne Lappalainen, lyrics: Kaasinen, traditional) – 3:54
4. "Synti / The Sin" (music: Varilo, lyrics: Kaasinen, trad) – 4:04
5. "Maaria" (music: Aho, lyrics: Timo Kiiskinen) – 4:49
6. "Miero / The Outcast" (music: Markku Lepistö, lyrics: Kaasinen, Lepistö, Logrén, trad) – 4:46
7. "Mierontie / Path of the Outcast" (music: Varilo, lyrics: Kaasinen, Aho) – 2:48
8. "Mustat kengät / Black Shoes" (music: Virtanen, lyrics: Kiiskinen) – 3:54
9. "Lupaus / The Promise" (music: Lappalainen, lyrics: Kaasinen, trad) – 5:39
10. "Lumotar / The Enchantress" (music: Virtanen, Logrén, lyrics: Kaasinen) – 2:23
11. "9 lukkoa / 9 Locks" (music: Varilo) – 2:46
12. "Eerama" (music: Aho, Kaasinen, Virtanen, lyrics: Kaasinen, Virtanen) – 1:59
13. "Vaiten valvoin / I Lay Awake" (music: Virtanen, lyrics: Virtanen) – 4:29

== Personnel ==
- Susan Aho – vocals
- Mari Kaasinen – vocals
- Johanna Virtanen – vocals
- Janne Lappalainen – bouzouki, soprano saxophone, kaval, low whistle
- Markku Lepistö – 2- and 5-row accordions, 10-string kantele
- Lassi Logrén – fiddles, jouhikko, nyckelharpa, harmonium, vocal
- Jaska Lukkarinen – drums, percussion, voices
- Hannu Rantanen – double bass
- Antto Varilo – acoustic guitars, electric guitar, guitalele, fodo guitar, saz
