= Kalfou Danjere =

Studio album by Boukman Eksperyans
- Released: 1992
- Studio: Audiotek
- Genre: Misik rasin
- Label: Mango
- Producer: Eric Clermontet

Boukman Eksperyans chronology
Vodou Adjae (1991)	Kalfou Danjere (1992)	Libete (Pran Pou'l!) (1995)

Kalfou Danjere is an album by the Haitian band Boukman Eksperyans, released in 1992. The title track, which translates to "Dangerous Crossroads", was banned in Haiti for its alleged subversive qualities. "Nwel Inosan" was also banned.

The album peaked at No. 1 on Billboard's World Albums chart, spending 19 weeks on the chart.

== Production ==
The album was produced by Eric Clermontet. It was recorded at Audiotek Studios, in Port-au-Prince, Haiti, with some work accomplished at Studio Center in the United States. Founder Lolo Beaubrun and his anthropologist wife traveled around Haiti to study the music of lakous, or hamlets; "Kalfou Danjere" incorporated four different rhythms picked up from lakous.

== Critical reception ==
Professional ratings
Review scores
Source	Rating
AllMusic	4.5/5 stars
Robert Christgau	(2-star Honorable Mention)
The Encyclopedia of Popular Music	4/5 stars
MusicHound World: The Essential Album Guide	5/5 stars

Entertainment Weekly wrote that the band "weds roots rhythms to fierce electric rock, and whose gentle, metaphorical lyrics have the power to make a dictator sweat bullets." Robert Christgau praised "Zansèt Nou Yo". The New York Times deemed the songs "vigorous pop with an undercurrent of voodoo drumming."

Rolling Stone called the album "rich with traditional Afro-Haitian drumming, cross-stitched with edgy electric guitar and synthesizer patterns and ringing with the voice of defiance." The Chicago Tribune stated: "Drawing on the traditional, percussive, festival music called rara and older vodoun forms, Boukman has fashioned a fresh new sound that celebrates Haiti's rich African rhythmic and cultural roots." The Sun-Sentinel considered the album a "melodically compelling and lyrically rich effort."

== Track listing ==
No.	Title	Length
1.	"Bay Bondyè Giwa"
2.	"Tande M Tande"
3.	"Jou Nou Revolte"
4.	"Kouman Sa Ta Ye"
5.	"Nanm Nan Boutey"
6.	"Badè Zile"
7.	"Zansèt Nou Yo"
8.	"Nwel Inosan"
9.	"Eve"
10.	"Fèy"
11.	"Vodou Adjae"
12.	"Kalfou Danjere"
13.	"Mayi A Gaye"
