= Jorge Chaminé =

Portuguese baritone

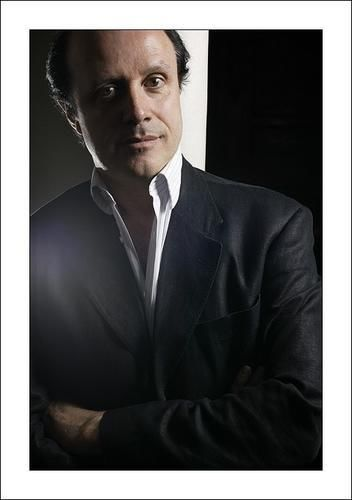
Chaminé in Paris

Jorge Chaminé (born 30 April 1956) is a Portuguese operatic baritone.

== Biography ==
Of Spanish and Portuguese parentage, Chaminé was born in Porto. He began his musical studies (piano, voice, cello, guitar, choral and orchestra conducting) at an early age. After studying law at Coimbra University, he decided to become a singer and received a scholarship from the Gulbenkian Foundation to further his studies in Madrid, Paris, Munich, and in New York City with personalities like Lola Rodríguez Aragón, Teresa Berganza and Hans Hotter.

He made his Carnegie Hall debut with Seiji Ozawa and the Boston Symphony Orchestra and has also performed with the London Symphony Orchestra, the Czech Philharmonic Orchestra, the Rundfunk-Sinfonieorchester Berlin, and the Ensemble Intercontemporain among others. In 1988, he won the Menuhin Foundation Award which led him to perform internationally under the direction of Yehudi Menuhin. He has appeared with Claudio Scimone, Rafael Frühbeck de Burgos, Plácido Domingo, Michel Corboz, and Ros Marbà, and appeared in opera performances and concerts alongside Mirella Freni, Montserrat Caballé and Teresa Berganza.

He is equally at home in the English, French, German, Russian, Italian, Spanish and Portuguese languages and repertory.

He is a regular performer of tango, boleros, gypsy songs, fado and the songs of Vinicius de Moraes and Jobim—the music and languages of his own origins. He has recorded for Lyrinx, RCA, Harmonia Mundi, Naïve, ADDA, Sons Croisés/Exodos and BMG.

Chaminé has won a number of honours, prizes and awards. He is frequently invited as a guest teacher and gives master classes in a number of music academies in Europe, US, Canada and Brazil. He is at the origin of a workshop Sons Croisés for musicians of all disciplines which is held regularly at the Spanish College in Paris (Colegio de España). More than 200 musicians from 47 countries worked with him in these Workshops.

He is president-Artistic Director of the CIMA Festival in Monte Argentario, Tuscany. He is also vice-president of the Georges Bizet Association. He was nominated Music Ambassador of the organisation Music in ME (Music in Middle East) at the UNESCO in May 2005. Since then he has also been a member of the board of directors of Music in ME International and president of Music in ME France. He created and is the Artistic Director of the Festival Ibériades and the Artistic Director of the Festival de Bougival. He received from Federico Mayor the Human Rights Medal of the Unesco. Lately, Jorge Chaminé became guest teacher of the University of Stanford (International Program), and with the sustain of the EU he created a project Music4Rom, for the recognition of the contribution of Rom music in the classical music. www.music4rom.com. He is a member of the board of directors of the International Yehudi Menuhin Foundation. Since 2015 he is the founder and president of the CEM https://cemusique.org. On 31 August 2018, Chaminé was nominated "Officier" Ordre des Arts et Lettres of the French government.

== Discography ==
- 1988
  - Jean Schwarz – Vier Jahreszeiten, Jorge Chaminé . INA 1004
- 1991
  - Brahms – German Requiem, Jorge Chaminé, Claudia Boettcher, Ivan Goran Kovacevic Choir, Bohemia Symphony Orchestra conducted by Jiri Mikula. ADDA (live performance)
  - Tchaikovsky "Pique Dame", Mirella Freni, Maureen Forrester, Vladimir Atlantov, Jorge Chaminé, Tanglewood Festival Chorus, Boston Symphony Orchestra conducted by Seiji Ozawa. RCA (3 cd – live performance)
- 1992
  - Tangos Jorge Chaminé, Olivier Manoury, bandoneon. Silex
  - Hebrew Songs works from Ravel, Bloch, lithurgy and ladinos. Jorge Chaminé, Marie-Françoise Bucquet. ADDA (live performance)
  - Berlioz – L'Enfance du Christ Danielle Borst, Jorge Chaminé, Michel Pastor, Lionel Sarrazin, Choeur du Val d'Oise conducted by Michel Piquemal. ADIAM 95 (2 cd live performance)
- 1994
  - Edmund Pendleton – Miracle de la Nativité Susan Bullock, Stephan Imboden, Jorge Chaminé, Ensemble Instrumental Jean Walter Audoli, Ensemble Vocal Michel Piquemal conducted by Jean Walter Audoli
- 1995
  - Carlos Guastavino – Songs, Jorge Chaminé, Marie-Françoise Bucquet, piano. Lyrinx
- 1996
  - Luis de Pablo – Tarde de Poetas, Jorge Chamine with the Valencia Choir and the Orquesta da Camara Teatro Lliure conducted by Josep Pons. Harmonia Mundi.
  - Claudio Carneyro – Songs Jorge Chaminé, Marie-Françoise Bucquet, piano. Movieplay Classics.
- 2000
  - Brahms – Lieder Jorge Chaminé, Marie-Françoise Bucquet, piano. Lyrinx
- 2006
  - Alma Latina Vol.1: Songs on poems of Vinicius de Moraes Jorge Chaminé, Norberto Pedreira, guitar, Daniel Diaz, bass guitar, Javier Estrella and Dada Viana, percussion. Sons Croisés/Exodos.
