= Musta Lindu =

Studio album by Värttinä
- Released: 1989
- Genre: Finnish folk music
- Length: 40:17
- Label: Olarin Musiikki

Värttinä chronology
Värttinä (1987)	Musta Lindu (1989)	Oi Dai (1991)

Musta Lindu (re-released as Black Bird), is Värttinä's 2nd album, released in 1989 by Olarin Musiikki. Like their first album, it is mostly traditional Karelian and Finnish folk songs, with 15 girls singing and playing kantele and 6 young men on acoustic instruments.

In 1998, the album was re-released under the title Black Bird, by Finlandia Innovators.

== Track listing ==
1. "Sorja poika" / "Pretty Boy" (traditional / Sari Kaasinen) – 2:58
2. "Musta lindu" / "Black Bird" (trad. / S. Kaasinen) – 3:02
3. "Itku" / "Weep" (S. Kaasinen) – 5:11
4. "Ui ui" / "Oh..." (trad. / S.Kaasinen) – 2:37
5. "Täst' se lähti toinen tahti" / "The Second Beat" (trad. / S. Kaasinen) – 4:59
6. "Vot i kaalina" (trad. / S. Kaasinen) – 1:47
7. "Kadrilli" / "Quatrille" (trad. / S. Kaasinen) – 3:08
8. "Ämmät" / "Old Wives" (trad. / S. Kaasinen) – 2:33
9. "Kylä vuotti uuttaa kuuta" / "Waiting For The New Moon" (trad. / S. Kaasinen) – 4:59
10. "Loitsu" / "Spell" (Värttinä boys) – 0:58
11. "Ruskie neitsyt" / "Brown-haired Maiden" (trad. / S. Kaasinen) – 2:22
12. "Ruskoi reggae" (trad. / S. Kaasinen) – 3:15
13. "Ankaralaisen turistin maahanpanopolkka" / "Funeral Polka of an Ankaran Tourist" (trad. / S. Kaasinen) – 2:12
