= Daniel Diaz (musician) =

Argentinian musician (born 1963)

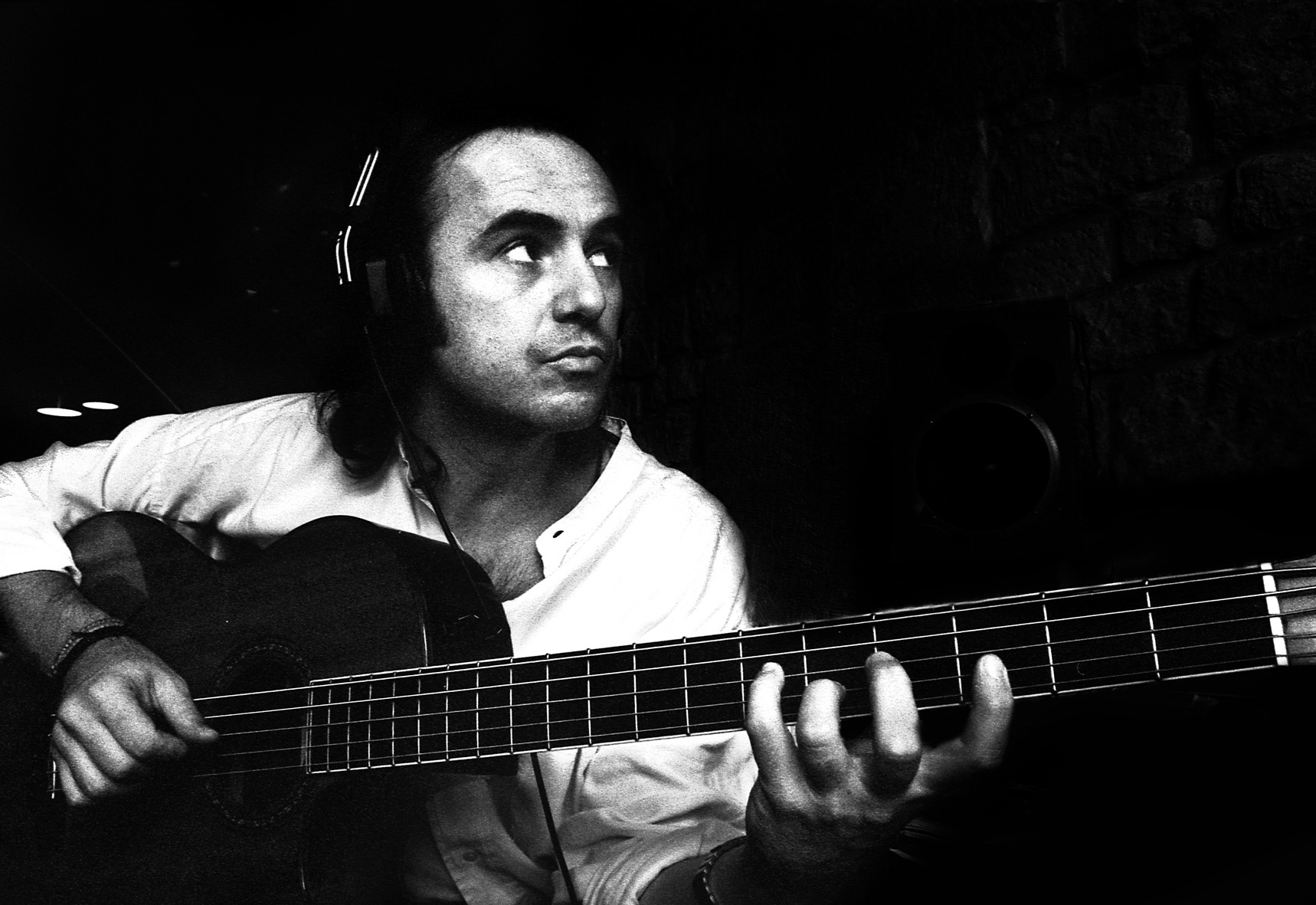
- Daniel Diaz in the studio 2005
- Born: Daniel Díaz Fernández; 22 November 1963 (age 62)
- Notable work: The Years Alone (1996); Segundo Ciclo (2002); Swan Song (2015); Souvenirs Panamericanos (2023)
- Style: Jazz, World, Experimental, Soundtrack

Daniel Díaz Fernández is an Argentinian bass player multi-instrumentalist, arranger, and composer known for his work for films and television, along with his fusion of different styles and genres of Argentinian music, jazz and experimental music. He has lived in Paris, France since 1997.

== Career ==
Since moving to France he has collaborated with Juan Carlos Cáceres, on the single Tango Negro, and on the album Toca Tango. Cáceres mentions Diaz in his song "Los Muchachos de París" with the lyrics:

"Daniel Diaz y el barba, los muchachos de París."

After the 2020-2021 pandemic he focused on his composer and studio work, producing collaborative albums with Argentine percussion player Minino Garay (fr), and Chamamé (es) music icon Raúl Barboza (es).

His last collaboration with Barboza was on the album Souvenirs Panamericanos, which was released in March 2023.

=== Solo career ===
In 1993 he recorded his first album The Years Alone released by North American label Green Linnet/Xenophile Records, with small media coverage. The variety of styles in this album was mentioned by critics.

Diaz played most of the parts (fretted and fretless basses, keyboards, acoustic and electric guitars, percussion, etc.) and included guest appearances of other South American players, such as Ricky Olarte on congas, Manuel Miranda on Sax, flute and Indian flutes, "Pato" Loza on drums, Beto Satragni on bass, Gustavo Paglia on bandoneon, Rikhi Hambra on tabla, and Miguel Angel Amaral on vocals.

He continued this solo career with Segundo Ciclo, recorded in 1997, released by Dutch jazz label Timeless Records in 2002, and Swan Song, released in 2015, always with guest players form around the world. Both albums featured the cosmopolitan jazz-fusion style of the first one.

=== Music for film, television and theatre ===
Since 2005 Diaz has been composing and recording for films, TV and documentaries. He works for French publisher and music library Cezame Music Agency (Frédéric Leibovitz Editeur) for whom he composed and recorded more than 250 tracks and released 5 albums alone or in collaboration. Since then he continued his work for films, TV and theatre, releasing hundreds of compositions for different publishers, in France: Cezame Music Agency, and Scoring Pictures/Universal Production Music, in Germany Sonoton GmbH, Music Vine and Indiesonics in England and Pacifica Music and Omnimusic in the USA.

In March 2009, he performed guitars and basses for the soundtrack of the film Undertow composed by Selma Mutal with whom he collaborated in the past, on the album Natural Energies.

In November 2009, he composed and performed the original music for Tennessee Williams’ Suddenly, Last Summer (Soudain l'été dernier in French) directed by Réné Loyon performed at Théâtre de la Tempête and Theatre des Celestins in France.

In 2012 he attended the Festival De Cannes as original score composer, for the short film Quitte ou Double.

Since 2010 his music has been used on many TV documentaries and films. In 2022 his track "Club Recoleta" from the album Elec' Tango was used on Tom McCarthy's feature film Stillwater.

== Discography ==
=== As a solo artist ===
- The Years Alone (1996 Green Linnet/Xenophile 4031) USA, CD & Cassette.
- Segundo Ciclo (1997 Tímeles Records CD SJP 459) Netherlands, CD.
- Lugar Comun (2005 DedeLand/Exodos CDDD009) France, CD.
- LOW Volume 1 (2007 DedeLand/Éxodos CDDD011) France, CD.
- Musique Mécanique Boxset + Musique Mécanique Addendum (bonus tracks) + Lärmknunst (2010 DedeLand/Éxodos CDDD012) France, CD.
- Maquina Blanda (2012 DedeLand Music) France, CD/download.
- Swan Song (2015 Dedeland 016) France CD.
- Landscapes Consonance and Solitude (2016 Dedeland 017) France, digital album.
- Nightwatch (2017 Dedeland 018) France, digital EP
- Invisible Soundtracks (2018 Dedeland 019) France, digital album
- Film Noir & City Nights (2020 Dedeland 022) France, digital album
- Understated Passion Melodies (2021 Dedeland 023) France, digital album
- Miniatures Volume 1 (2021 DedeLand 024) France, digital album
- Miniatures Volume 2 (2022 DedeLand 025) France, digital album
- Souvenirs Panamericanos with Raul Barboza (2023 Cezame Music Agency CEL7034) France, digital album

=== Notable collaborations (selection) ===
- Juan Del Barrio El Alma Secreta de las Cosas (1993 Ciclo3) Argentina. co-producer.
- Xeito Novo Galimérica (1994 Melopea) Argentina. Electric bass (as member of Rodolfo Garcia's La Barraca)
- Osvaldo Burucuá Paisaje (1995 PAI3029 Argentina). Bass, producer.
- Jorge Chaminé Alma Latina Vol 1 (2005 Éxodos/SonsCroisés, France) Bass, producer.
- Peio Serbielle Zara (2014 indep, france). Arrangements, Co-producer, basses, multi-instrumentalist.
- Raul Barboza Trio 12 de Julio en París (2019 DedeLand, France). Bass, producer
- Daniel Diaz & Pajaro Canzani La Otra America (2006 Cezame Music Agency CEZ 4048 & 4049)
- Daniel Diaz Elect’ Tango (2011 Cezame Music Agency CEZ 4093)
- Daniel Diaz & Selma Mutal Natural Energies (2012 Cezame Music Agency CEZ 4099).
- Daniel Diaz, Pajaro Canzani, Selma Mutal Géopolitique Amérique Latine (2012 Cezame Music Agency CEV3032)
- Daniel Diaz, Daniel Finot, Arnaud Rozermblat Just Bass (2012 Cezame Music Agency (CEZ4110)
- Raul Barboza & Daniel Diaz Ruta 40 (2013 Cezame Carte Blanche, CCB1007)
- Daniel Diaz/Laurent Levesque Repetitive Minimalism (2022 Universal /Scoring Pictures, France SCP021)
- Daniel Diaz & Minino Garay Latin Percussionary (2022 Sonoton, Germany SCDV1135)
