= Aitara =

Studio album by Värttinä
- Released: 1994
- Recorded: Finnvox-Studio, Helsinki Sept 1994
- Genre: Finnish folk music
- Length: 41:40
- Label: Mipu Music
- Producer: Janne Haavisto

Värttinä chronology
Seleniko (1992)	Aitara (1994)	Kokko (1996)

Aitara is Värttinä's 5th album, released in 1994 in Finland. In 1995, it was released by King Records in Japan, Music & Words in Benelux, and Xenophile Records in the United States, where it spent five weeks at #1 on the CMJ World Music charts. In 2003, it was re-released in Finland by BMG, and has been re-released in the U.S. by NorthSide.

Aitara was named "Best Contemporary World Music Album" by the National Association of Independent Record Distributors.

For their second video, Värttinä used "Yötulet" from this album.

== Track listing ==
1. "Katariina" – 2:14
2. "Tumala" – 3:28
3. "Maamo" ("Mother") – 3:59
4. "Niin mie mieltynen" ("The Beloved") – 4:02
5. "Mie tahon tanssia" ("I Want To Dance") – 3:05
6. "Tammi" ("The Oak") – 4:04
7. "Pirsta" ("Silver") – 2:33
8. "Outona omilla mailla" ("A Stranger In My Own Land") – 3:27
9. "Travuska" – 4:52
10. "Yötulet" ("The Night Fire") – 3:04
11. "Kannunkaataja" ("The Tippler") – 3:59
12. "Aitara" – 2:49

== Personnel ==
=== Värttinä ===
- Mari Kaasinen – vocals
- Sari Kaasinen – vocals
- Kirsi Kähkönen – vocals
- Sirpa Reiman – vocals
- Janne Lappalainen – bouzouki, reeds, whistles
- Pekka Lehti – string bass, Hammond organ
- Riitta Potinoja – 5-row accordion, Hammond organ
- Kari Reiman – violin, kantele, cimbalom
- Antto Varilo – guitars, cümbüs tanbur

=== Guest ===
- Anssi Nykänen – Aitara-drums

== Singles ==
=== Tumala, Travuska ===
A single containing "Tumala" and "Travuska" was released by Mipu Music in Finland in 1994.

=== Mie Tahon Tanssia, Kannunkaataja ===
In 1995, a single containing "Mie Tahon Tanssia" and "Kannunkaataja" was released in Finland by Mipu Music.

=== Yötulet ===
In 1996, a single containing "Tuulilta Tuleva" and "Kokko" from the album Kokko and "Yötulet" from this album was released by Nonesuch in Australia.
