= Eddy François =

Haitian musician

Eddy François is a Haitian musician.

== Early life ==
Eddy François was born in Cap-Haïtien.

== Career ==
He began his music career as a guitarist and bassist in a choir, influenced by 80s music. In 1988, he joined the Kompa band Superstar Music Machine and that following year he cofounded the Boukman Eksperyans band combining traditional rhythms with rock and pop. Their hits include ‘Kèm Pa Sote’, ‘Pwazon Rat’or and ‘Se Kreyol Nou Ye’.

In 1990, he left the band to front a new band, Boukan Ginen. The band won the RFI ‘prix découverte’ in 1994 for Jou a Rive, and appeared on the cover of the New York Times following a performance in Central Park.

In 1992, François was awarded "Best singer in the Caribbean" by Rolling Stone magazine.

In the early 2000s, Eddy François started a solo career and released Zinga, fusing soul, blues and traditional music with thoughtful lyrics. He released a second album Djohu in 2008.

== Discography ==
- See Boukman Eksperyans 1985–1989
- See Boukan Ginen 1990–present

Solo albums:

- Zinga (2004)
- Djohu (2008)
1. Djohu
2. Blakawout
3. Koule
4. Sou Do'm
5. Zang Yo
6. Afrikayiti
7. Na woule
8. Lakay
9. Anacaona
10. Tchaka Mizik
11. Tande Kri A Yo
