= Simbi (band) =

Swedish rasin band

- Origin: Gothenburg, Sweden
- Genres: Mizik rasin
- Years active: 1987–present
- Label: Xenophile
- Members: Sten Kallman, Vocals; Marianne N’Lemvo Lindén, Vocals; Lotta Sjolin, Vocals; Sanna Bergman, Vocals; Henrik Cederblom, Guitar; Stefan Bergman, Bass; Terje Sundby, Drummer; Tina Johansson, Drummer

Simbi is a mizik rasin band formed in 1987. The name of the band comes from the name for a family of vodou loa, or gods, called the simbi.

== History ==
The members of Simbi are all Swedish, but the music they perform is inspired by the Haitian vodou roots music movement known as mizik rasin. The band is known by their Haitian fans as the "Blue-Eyed Haitians".

== Discography ==
Year	Album	Label	Notes
1995	Vodou Beat	Xenophile	
1998	Kreol	Imogena	
2003	Kalalou	Xource	
