= Iki (Värttinä album) =

iki

Studio album by Värttinä
- Released: February 28, 2003
- Recorded: Finnvox and Hitsville Stuios, Helsinki September 2002
- Genre: Finnish folk music
- Length: 46:17
- Label: BMG Finland
- Producer: Janne Haavisto

Värttinä chronology
Double Life (2002)	iki (2003)	Snow Angel (2005)

Professional ratings
Review scores
Source	Rating
BBC	(extremely favorable) link
PopMatters	(favorable) May 23 2003
Songlines	(favorable) May 01, 2003 (mirror)

iki is Värttinä's 11th album (9th studio album), released in 2003. It continues Värttinä's trend of having more original compositions, while retaining a folk influence in the songs and their style.

iki was released on February 28, 2003 by BMG Finland in Finland, to coincide with Värttinä's 20th anniversary concert in Helsinki. Later in the spring of 2003, it was released by Frea in Benelux, Resistencia in Spain, Westpark Music in Germany, NorthSide in the United States, Koruna Music in Japan, and in the United Kingdom and France.

In Songlines' July/August 2003 issue, iki was the 24th selection on their "50 World Music Albums You Must Own".

== Track listing ==
1. "Syyllinen Syli (osa 1)" / "Faithless Arms (part 1)" (music: Anto Varilo; lyrics: Mari Kaasinen, traditional) – 1:30
2. "Tuulen Tunto" / "To Feel the Wind" (Janne Lappalainen; M. Kaasinen, Johanna Virtanen, trad.) – 5:00
3. "Sepän Poika" / "The Blacksmith's Son" (Varilo; Kiiskinen) – 3:19
4. "Tauti" / "Disease" (Varilo; M. Kaasinen, trad.) – 4:04
5. "Morsian" / "The Bride" (Varilo; M. Kaasinen, trad.) – 4:45
6. "Nahkaruoska" / "Leather Whip" (M. Kaasinen; M. Kaasinen, Virtanen, trad.) – 3:08
7. "Maahinen Neito" / "Earth-maiden" (Susan Aho; Kiiskinen) – 4:23
8. "Potran Korean" / "A Sturdy Handsome Lad" (Aho; Kiiskinen) – 2:33
9. "Vihi" (Varilo; no lyrics) – 3:31
10. "Hopeat" / "Silver" (Lappalainen; M. Kaasinen) – 5:36
11. "Tumma" / "Dark" (Lappalainen; M. Kaasinen) – 4:30
12. "Syyllinen Syli (osa 2)" / "Faithless Arms (part 2)" (Varilo; M. Kaasinen, trad.) – 4:13

== Personnel ==
- Mari Kaasinen – vocals
- Susan Aho – vocals
- Johanna Virtanen – vocals
- Antto Varilo – 6 & 12 string guitars, saz, dobro, fado guitar, kantele, bass kantele, organ
- Janne Lappalainen – bouzouki, saxophone, cava, low whistle
- Lassi Logren – fiddle, octave fiddle, jouhikko, nyckelharpa, vocals
- Markku Lepistö – accordion
- Hannu Rantanen – double bass
- Jaska Lukkarinen – drums, percussion
