= Rääkkylä =

- Municipality
- Rääkkylän kunta Rääkkylä kommun
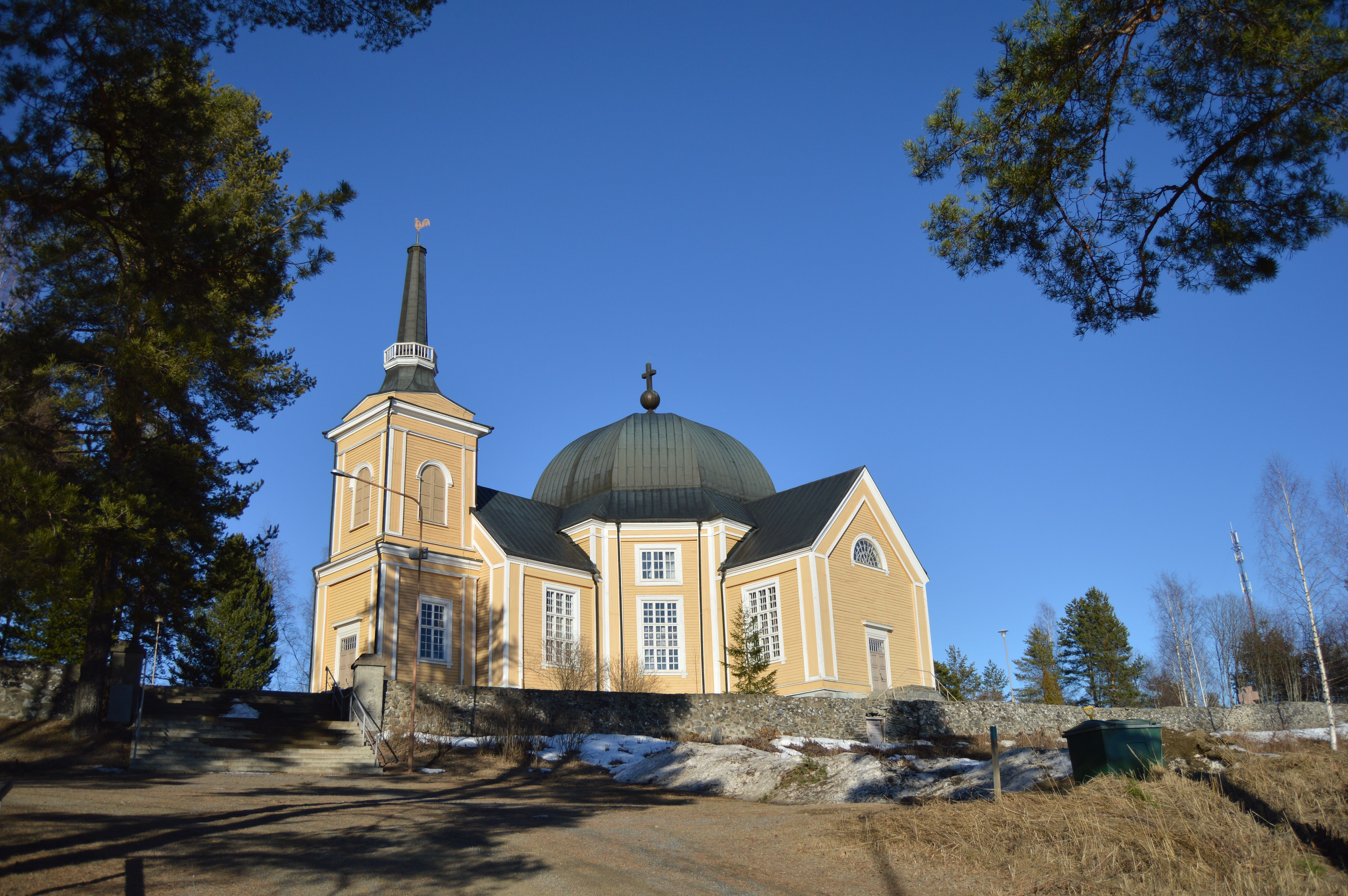

- Coat of arms

- Location of Rääkkylä in Finland
- Interactive map of Rääkkylä
- Coordinates: 62°18.8′N 029°37.5′E
- Country: Finland
- Region: North Karelia
- Sub-region: Central Karelia
- Charter: 1874

Government
  - Municipal manager: Tommi Lepojärvi

Area (2018-01-01)
  - Total: 699.68 km^{2} (270.15 sq mi)
  - Land: 427.93 km^{2} (165.22 sq mi)
  - Water: 272.01 km^{2} (105.02 sq mi)
  - Rank: 197th largest in Finland

Population (2025-12-31)
  - Total: 1,830
  - Rank: 262nd largest in Finland
  - Density: 4.28/km^{2} (11.1/sq mi)

Population by native language
  - Finnish: 94.8% (official)
  - Others: 5.2%

Population by age
  - 0 to 14: 8.2%
  - 15 to 64: 50.5%
  - 65 or older: 41.2%
- Time zone: UTC+02:00 (EET)
  - Summer (DST): UTC+03:00 (EEST)
- Website: www.raakkyla.fi

Rääkkylä (Finnish pronunciation: [ˈræːkːylæ]; Swedish also Bräkylä) is a municipality of Finland. It is located in the province of Eastern Finland and is part of the North Karelia region. The municipality has a population of 1,830 (31 December 2025), which make it the smallest municipality in North Karelia in terms of population. It covers an area of 699.68 square kilometres (270.15 sq mi) of which 272.01 km^{2} (105.02 sq mi) is water. The population density is 4.28 inhabitants per square kilometre (11.1/sq mi). The municipality is unilingually Finnish.

The municipality has previously also been known as "Bräkylä" in Swedish documents, but is today referred to as "Rääkkylä" also in Swedish.

Rääkkylä as an independent municipality was established in 1874 from parts of Kitee and Liperi. Neighbouring municipalities are Joensuu, Kitee, Liperi, Savonlinna and Tohmajärvi.

Leading Finnish kantele manufacturer Koistinen Kantele has been functioning in Rääkkylä since 1995.

== History ==
In the 15th century, the current Rääkkylä belonged to Kitee and paid taxes to Novgorod. It was a troubled border region, with disputes between Sweden and Novgorod, and between Orthodox and Lutherans. In the 17th century, an important trade route for Russians and Karelians passed through Rääkkylä. Rääkkylä was ordered to become independent from Kitee's chapel congregation in 1857.

== Notable people ==
- Actor Esa Pakarinen (1911–1989), better known for his role as Pekka Puupää
- Author Raimo J. Kinnunen (born 1931)
- Mari and Sari Kaasinen, founders of the popular Finnish folk music band Värttinä.
