= 385 Ilmatar =

Main-belt asteroid

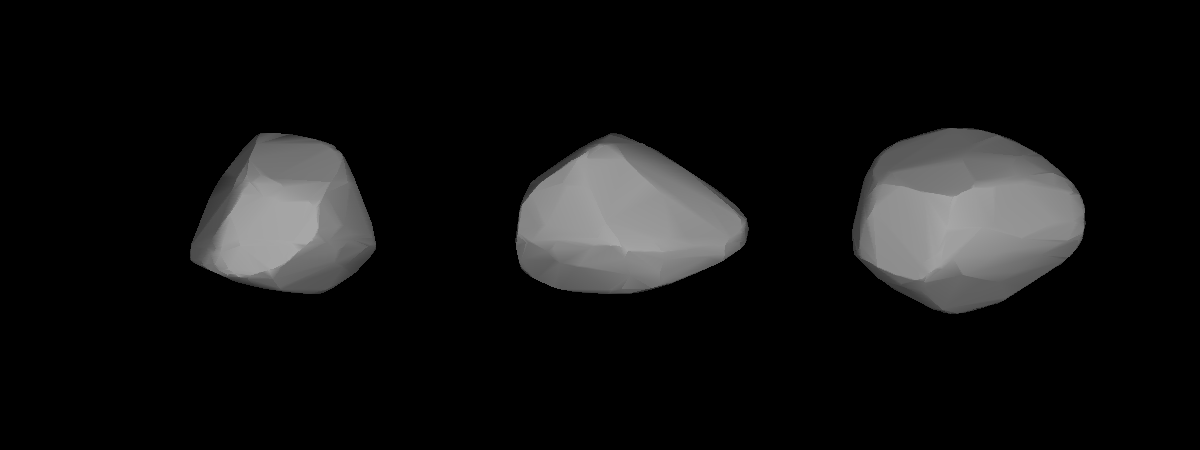
- Lightcurve-base 3D-model of 385 Ilmatar.

Discovery
- Discovered by: Max Wolf
- Discovery date: 1 March 1894

Designations
- Named after: Ilmatar
- Alternative designations: 1894 AX
- Minor planet category: Main belt

Orbital characteristics
- Epoch 31 July 2016 (JD 2457600.5)
- Uncertainty parameter 0
- Observation arc: 122.12 yr (44604 d)
- Aphelion: 3.19998 AU (478.710 Gm)
- Perihelion: 2.50226 AU (374.333 Gm)
- Semi-major axis: 2.85112 AU (426.521 Gm)
- Eccentricity: 0.12236
- Orbital period (sidereal): 4.81 yr (1758.4 d)
- Mean anomaly: 166.647°
- Mean motion: 0° 12^{m} 17.024^{s} / day
- Inclination: 13.5514°
- Longitude of ascending node: 345.021°
- Argument of perihelion: 187.911°

Physical characteristics
- Mean diameter: 83.857±0.576 km
- Mass: (1.039 ± 0.515/0.201)×10^{18} kg (7.04±0.90)×10^{17} kg (Note: Calculated from its standard gravitational parameter GM = 0.047±0.006 km^{3}/s^{2}.)
- Mean density: 3.136 ± 1.555/0.607 g/cm^{3} 2.12 g/cm^{3} (Note: Assuming a diameter of 85.8 km.)
- Synodic rotation period: 62.35 h (2.598 d)
- Geometric albedo: 0.242±0.042
- Spectral type: S
- Absolute magnitude (H): 7.85

385 Ilmatar is a large main belt asteroid.

It was discovered by Max Wolf on March 1, 1894, in Heidelberg. It was named after Ilmatar, virgin spirit of the air from the Finnish epic Kalevala. Its mass has been estimated as (1.039 ± 0.515/0.201)×10^{18} kg. Its rotation is 62.35 hr.
