= Japanese ship Iki =

Two ships of the Japanese Navy have been named Iki:

- Japanese battleship Iki was previously the Russian battleship Imperator Nikolai I launched in 1889 and renamed on capture by Japan in 1905. She was expended as a target in 1915.
- Japanese escort ship Iki was an Etorofu-class escort ship launched in 1943 and sunk in 1944
