= Boukan Ginen =

- Origin: Port-au-Prince, Haiti
- Genres: Mizik rasin
- Years active: 1990–present
- Label: Xenophile
- Members: Eddy François, Lead Singer; Vladimir Jean-Félix, Lead Guitar; Richard Laguerre, Bass Guitar; Bedy Andre Eugene, Guitar; Milot Eliassaint, Keyboards; Evans Seney, Drummer; Myrtho Exavier, Drummer; Dieusuel Liberus, Drummer; Jude Sanon, Drummer; Jean Dorvil, Percussion; Manina Paniague, Chorus; Carline Ruiz, Chorus; Charles Heurtelou, Chorus

Boukan Ginen is a mizik rasin band from the city of Port-au-Prince, Haiti. Boukan is the Haitian Creole word for "bonfire" or "fire pit". Ginen is a specific Haitian name for the ancestral home of enslaved Africans.

== History ==
Boukan Ginen won the prize for best carnival song at the 1991 Carnival in Port-au-Prince, for their performance of "Pale Pale W", a song later released on their debut album, Jou a Rive. The song title means "talk" and included lyrics widely interpreted as supporting the presidency of Jean-Bertrand Aristide. The band's music was suppressed by the military authority of the junta led by Raoul Cédras that ruled the country from 1991 to 1994.

In 1994, Boukan Ginen became the third Haitian musical group to receive the Prix Découverte from Radio France International.

== Discography ==
Year	Album	Label	Notes
1995	Jou a Rive	Xenophile	
1996	Rèv an Nou	Xenophile	
