= 6.12. =

Live album by Värttinä
- Released: 3 September 2001
- Recorded: 6 December 2000; Savoy Theatre, Helsinki
- Genre: Finnish folk music
- Length: 55:34
- Label: BMG Finland
- Producer: Pekka Lehti

Värttinä chronology
Ilmatar (2000)	6.12. (2001)	Double Life (2002)

Professional ratings
Review scores
Source	Rating
Miami New Times	favorable

6.12. (Live in Helsinki in the United States) is Värttinä's 9th album and first live album, released on 3 September 2001. It was recorded in the Finland Independence Day, 6 December 2000.

All songs on 6.12. appear on earlier Värttinä studio albums. 6.12. has less-varied instrumentation than their studio albums (after Oi Dai).

After being realized in Finland by BMG Finland, 6.12. was released by Resistencia in Spain in 2001. In 2002, it was released in Germany, Austria and Switzerland by Westpark, in Benelux by Frea, and in the United States by NorthSide.

== Track listing ==
All tracks were arranged by Värttinä, except for "Käppee" by Mari Kaasinen

No.	Title	Writer(s)	Length
1.	"Äijö"	Antto Varilo / Kirsi Kähkönen	4:54
2.	"Viikon vaivane"	traditional / Sari Kaasinen	4:17
3.	"Käppee"	M. Kaasinen	2:26
4.	"Hoptsoi"	Kari Reiman	3:08
5.	"Meri"	K. Reiman / Sirpa Reiman	5:33
6.	"Liigua"	Susan Aho	5:23
7.	"Kylä vuotti uutta kuuta"	trad.	4:43
8.	"Pihi neito"	trad. / S. Kaasinen	3:24
9.	"Mie tahon tanssia"	Janne Lappalainen / S. Kaasinen	3:18
10.	"Laulutyttö"	K. Reiman / S. Reiman	3:05
11.	"Outona omilla mailla"	K. Reiman / S. Reiman	3:14
12.	"Ukko Lumi"	trad.	3:24
13.	"Seelinnikoi"	trad. / S. Kaasinen	3:18
14.	"Vot i kaalina"	trad.	3:01

- Also includes "Äijö" video

== Personnel ==
- Susan Aho – vocals, percussion
- Mari Kaasinen – vocals
- Kirsi Kähkönen – vocals
- Riikka Timonen – vocals
- Janne Lappalainen – bouzouki, saxophone
- Markku Lepistö – accordion
- Pekka Lehti – double bass
- Kari Reiman – violin
- Marko Timonen – drums, percussion
- Antto Varilo – guitars

On the video, new members Johanna Virtanen and Jaska Lukkarinen replace Riikka Timonen and Marko Timonen, respectively.
