= Boukman Eksperyans =

Haitian musical group

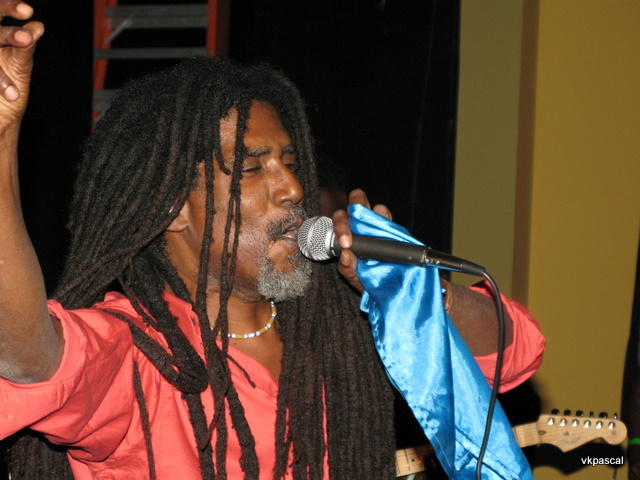
- Theodore Lolo Beaubrun, Lead Singer

Background information
- Origin: Port-au-Prince, Haiti
- Genre: Mizik rasin
- Years active: 1978–present
- Labels: Mango Records; Island Records; Tuff Gong International; Converge Records; Balenjo Music
- Members: Theodore "Lòlò" Beaubrun, Lead Singer; Mimerose "Manzè" Beaubrun, Lead Singer; Gary Seney, Percussionist; Henry Pierre Joseph, Percussionist; Hans "Bwa Gris" Dominique, Percussionist; Maquel Jean Baptiste, Guitar; Jean Lourdy Coiscou, Keyboards; Willy Calixte, Bass Guitar; Raymond "Samba Drol" Lexis, Percussionist; Ted Gabriel Beaubrun, Tanbou/Artistic Director; Gerald Alfred, Guitar; Michel Melthon Lynch, Bass guitar Natacha Massillon, Backup vocals Louis "Toto" Eliphète, Percussionist; Moliere "Moali"Calice, Percussion/Drums; Johanne Dejean, "Dancer"; Johanne Colas, "Dancer"

Boukman Eksperyans (English: Boukman Experience) is a mizik rasin band from the city of Port-au-Prince, Haiti, Grammy nominated for their debut album Vodou Adjae. The band derives its name from Dutty Boukman, a vodou priest who led a religious ceremony in 1791 that is widely considered the start of the Haitian Revolution. The other half of the band's name, "Eksperyans", is the Haitian Creole word for "experience", and was inspired by the band's appreciation of the music of Jimi Hendrix. The band was at the height of its popularity in 1991 when the presidency of Jean Bertrand Aristide was overthrown in a military coup d'etat. Like many other artists and performers, Boukman Eksperyans fled the country to live in exile. During their time abroad, the band performed and spoke out against the military dictatorship of Raoul Cédras. In 1994, after Aristide was restored to power, the band returned to Haiti, where they continued to play concerts, record albums, and perform at the Carnival celebrations.

== History ==
Boukman Eksperyans was founded in 1978 by Theodore Beaubrun Jr., nicknamed Lolo, Marjorie Beaubrun (Lolo's sister), Daniel Beaubrun, Mimerose Beaubrun (nicknamed Manze, Lolo's wife), and members of various other groups who launched the mizik rasin revolution in Haiti in the late 1970s. One of these groups was led by Fanfan Alexis, and included the future musicians of such groups as Group Sa, Foula, and Rara Machine. Lolo's father, Théodore Beaubrun (also known by his stage name Languichatte Debordus) was a comedian and was often referred to as the Bill Cosby of Haiti. While on tour in the United States, he brought back a James Brown LP which left a lasting impression on young Lolo. After his parents divorced, he followed his mother to Brooklyn, New York. He studied in the United States.

Lolo returned to Haiti in 1978, where some bands were playing music known as minidjaz. To Lolo, they seemed to pay no attention to song lyrics that dealt with reality. They were even accused of aligning too closely to the Duvaliers. When Lolo and Mimerose began to seek their musical goals, they felt a strong desire to incorporate the African element in Haiti's culture into their music. They decided to combine roots music with vodou religious and musical traditions.

Lolo's grandfather was deeply involved in vodou, but his parents never made this available to him. Lolo and Mimerose entered their first vodou lakou-s, a Haitian spiritual community, where they met musicians and singers. They also got their first real glance at the African culture of Haiti in the form it was handed down from members of various tribes. They founded a group to study vodou music, giving it the name of Moun Ife ("People of the Abode of the Deities"). Lolo stated that Bob Marley was another important musical inspiration. When he heard the Jamaican legend in 1976, he thought he could create something similar in Haiti with vodou. Lolo and Mimerose began to perform as a live act in the 1980s.

The traditional roots instruments were replaced by electric instruments, like the bass guitar and two guitars played by members Eddy François and Daniel Beaubrun, Lolo's brother and the band's chief arranger. Fanfan Alexis, the group's first guitarist, suggested the name "Boukman", which Lolo and Manze liked. The name was a tribute to the Jamaican slave leader Boukman Dutty, who launched the Haitian slave rebellion in August 1791. "Eksperyans" was chosen in honor of Jimi Hendrix and his band the Jimi Hendrix Experience.

Boukman Eksperyans first became famous in 1990 when they presented their song "Ké-M Pa Sote" at the Carnival celebration in Port-au-Prince. The song included the refrain "My heart doesn't leap, you don't scare me". This song was a protest against the post-Duvalier interim military government of General Prosper Avril. Armed soldiers appeared, trying to prevent the band from performing "Ké-M Pa Sote" and other censored songs. After a young girl was shot dead by a soldier, this song became an out-and-out battle hymn admonishing the government. The band continued to write and perform rebellious songs. The band members were never directly threatened, but were advised 'never go out at night'. When the military junta overthrew president Jean-Bertrand Aristide in 1991, the band decided to leave the country for their own safety.

The band achieved international fame in the early 1990s. Their first album Vodou Adjae was nominated for a Grammy Award in 1991.

Just before the second coup d'état against Aristide in 2004, Lolo joined with many others in protesting the abuses at the very least condoned by the President. In the years following, Boukman Eksperyans was not associated with any political party. Their songs depicted the reality of Haiti as they saw it.

In 2022, Boukman Eksperyans went on a US/Europe arena tour in support of Arcade Fire.

== Discography ==
Year	Album	Label	Notes
1991	Vodou Adjae	Mango Records	First album
1992	Kalfou Danjere	Mango Records	
1995	Libete (Pran Pou'l!)	Mango Records	
1998	Revolutíon	Tuff Gong International	
1998	Revolisyon	Tuff Gong International	Second release of Revolutíon
1999	Live at Red Rocks	Tuff Gong International	Live concert recording, August, 1998
2000	Kanaval Rasin - Vodou Adjae	Converge Records or Conversa-phone Institute (possibly)	Greatest hits album of songs performed at Carnival
2009	La Révolte des zombies	Balenjo Music	
2011	Live at New Orleans Jazz & Heritage Festival	MunckMix	2012 NAACP Image Award Nominee - Outstanding World Music Album
2018	Isit e Kounyea La	Balenjo Music	
