= Ilmatar (album) =

Studio album by Värttinä
- Released: May 24, 2000
- Recorded: November 1999, Finnvox Studios, Helsinki
- Genre: Finnish folk music
- Length: 47:03
- Label: BMG Finland
- Producer: Hughes de Courson

Värttinä chronology
Vihma (1998)	Ilmatar (2000)	6.12 (2001)

Ilmatar is Värttinä's eighth album, released in 2000.

The album is named for the Finnish goddess of air Ilmatar who, according to the creation story in the Kalevala, creates the world from two eggs from the eagle Kokko (which is also the name of an earlier Värttinä album). A version of this story (in English and Finnish) is printed in the liner notes of the United States release.

The track Käppee would later be sampled by two French rap groups—Sniper and Sexion D'assaut.

== Track listing ==
1. "Itkin" (Pekka Lehti / Kirsi Kähkönen, Mari Kaasinen, traditional) – 5:20
2. "Käppee" (Kaasinen / Kaasinen, trad.) – 2:34
3. "Laiska" (Kari Reiman / Sirpa Reiman) – 4:06
4. "Liigua" (Susan Aho / Aho, trad.) – 5:08
5. "Milja" (K. Reiman / S. Reiman) – 4:27
6. "Äijö" (Antto Varilo / Kähkönen) – 4:22
7. "Kivutar" (K. Reiman / S. Reiman, K. Reiman, trad.) – 3:28
8. "Linnunmieli" (K. Reiman, trad. / S. Reiman, trad.) – 3:57
9. "Lieto" (K. Reiman) – 3:06
10. "Sanat" (Janne Lappalainen / Kähkönen) – 4:37
11. "Meri" (K. Reiman, S. Reiman, trad.) – 5:59

== Personnel ==
=== Värttinä ===
- Susan Aho – vocals
- Mari Kaasinen – vocals
- Kirsi Kähkönen – vocals
- Riikka Väyrynen – vocals
- Janne Lappalainen – bouzouki, soprano saxophone, kaval
- Markku Lepistö – 5-row, 2-row and 1-row accordions, jouhikko
- Pekka Lehti – double bass
- Kari Reiman – fiddle
- Marko Timonen – Galician bass drum, tama, surdo, shekere, klong yaw, bucket, broom, bells, percussion
- Antto Varilo – 6 & 12 string guitars, cümbüş tanbur, 10-string kantele, vocals

=== Guests ===
- Hughes de Courson – kantele cluster, piano wires
- Gilles Chabenat – vielle à roue (1, 3, 9, 11)
- Ismo Alanko – spell in 6
- Nagy Lucina – lament in 11 (recorded 1959 in Hungary)
