= Värttinä =

Finnish folk music band

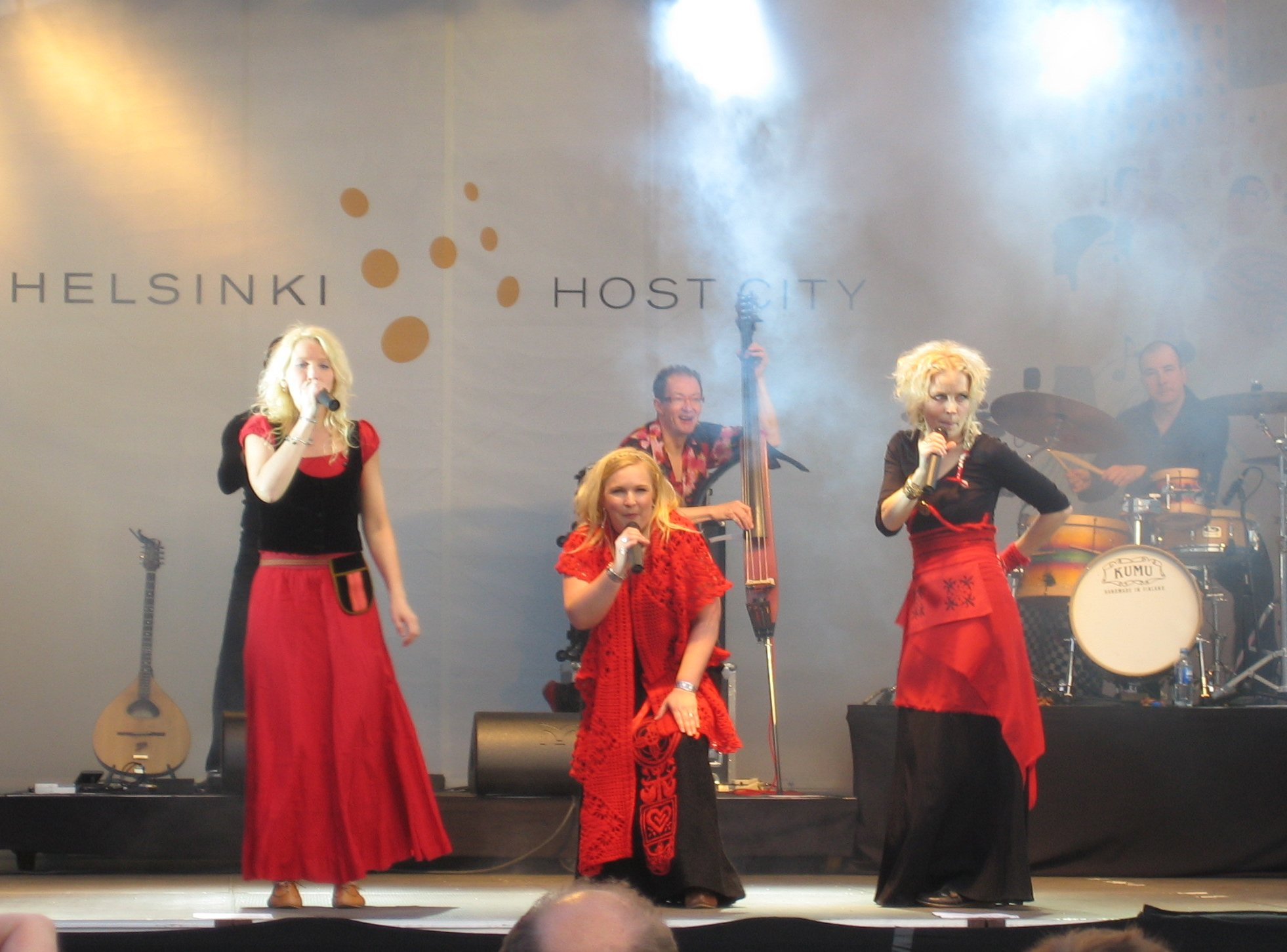
- Värttinä in 2007

Background information
- Origin: Rääkkylä, Finland
- Genres: Folk, worldbeat, world fusion
- Years active: 1983–present
- Labels: Nonesuch/Elektra Records; Real World Records
- Members: Mari Kaasinen-Paaso; Lassi Logrén; Susan Venhovaara; Hannu Rantanen; Mikko Hassinen; Karoliina Kantelinen; Matti Laitinen
- Website: www.varttina.fi

Värttinä (Finnish pronunciation: [ˈʋærtːinæ], meaning "spindle") is a Finnish folk music band that started as a project by Sari and Mari Kaasinen in 1983 in the village of Rääkkylä, in North Karelia county of Finland in Karelia. Many transformations have taken place in the band. Värttinä shot into fame with the release of their 1991 album Oi Dai. As of 2009, the band consists of three lead female vocalists supported by three acoustic musicians. The vocalists sing in the Karelian dialect of the Finnish language.

In August 2005, Värttinä recorded their tenth studio album, Miero, at Finnvox Studios, Helsinki. It was released on 25 January 2006 in Finland, and 30 January 2006 worldwide. In 2006, Värttinä also released the Värttinä Archive Live DVD, which included material from their 20th-anniversary concert and other new and archive material. Värttinä collaborated with A. R. Rahman, a notable Indian composer, in composing the music for the theatrical adaptation of the Lord of the Rings, which played in Toronto in 2006 and in London in 2007.

Värttinä has been featured in two episodes of popular animated children's show Arthur singing their hit song "Matalii ja Mustii" from the album Seleniko. The song was also featured on the show's first soundtrack, Arthur and Friends: The First Almost Real Not Live CD (Or Tape).

== History ==
=== Old Värttinä ===
The birth of Värttinä was heavily influenced by two sisters, Sari and Mari Kaasinen, from Rääkkylä. Guided by their mother, they had performed poems from the 1970s as a group named Tsupukat. After the group ceased in 1983, the girls established Värttinä, which they entered into a youth arts event and made their way into the finals. The following year they changed poem reading into singing, and this time the group won that same competition. In 1985 Värttinä, now having male members as well, made its first appearance in the Kaustinen Folk Music Festival. Folk music circles became aware of the band as the one singing "korkeelta ja kovvoo" (high and loud).

Sari Kaasinen had become the leading member of Värttinä, and children in Rääkkylä were eager to join the band; at its height, the group was accompanied by 21 children. When the group finally could not be made any bigger, Sari established a band called Sirmakka for the youngest ones wanting to join.

In the beginning of 1987 Värttinä was selected as the "Ensemble of the Year" in Kaustinen. Their first record, Värttinä, was recorded in the following spring. Instruments used were kantele, acoustic guitar, double bass, violin, accordion, saxophone, flute, and tin whistle. They gained more publicity and, according to a guess by Sari Kaasinen, made over a hundred performances in one year.

Their next album, Musta Lindu, was released in the summer of 1989. Playing skills and confidence had improved with experience, which can well be heard on the record. The pieces were Mari songs collected by Sari Kaasinen on her journeys; one of them was her own composition. Returning home from Åland at summer's end, it seemed that Värttinä had come to the end of its journey. But the Kaasinen sisters, Janne Lappalainen, Kirsi Kähkönen, and Minna Rautiainen did not want to give up because they had just found their own way of making music, and the beginning of the new Värttinä followed.

=== New Värttinä ===
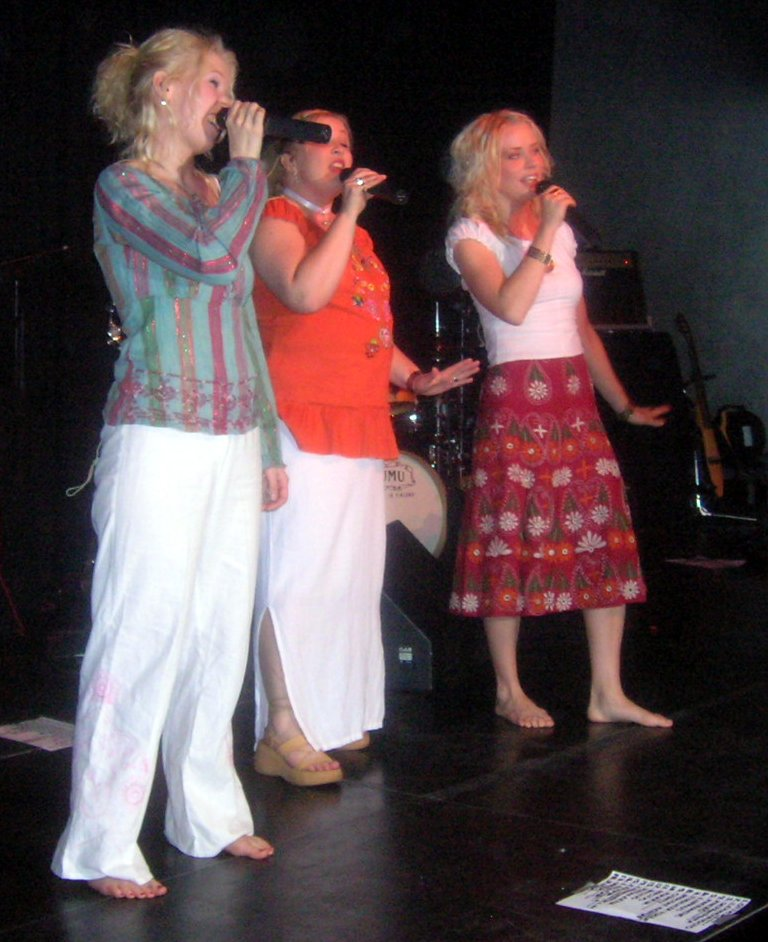
The band's vocalists in 2006

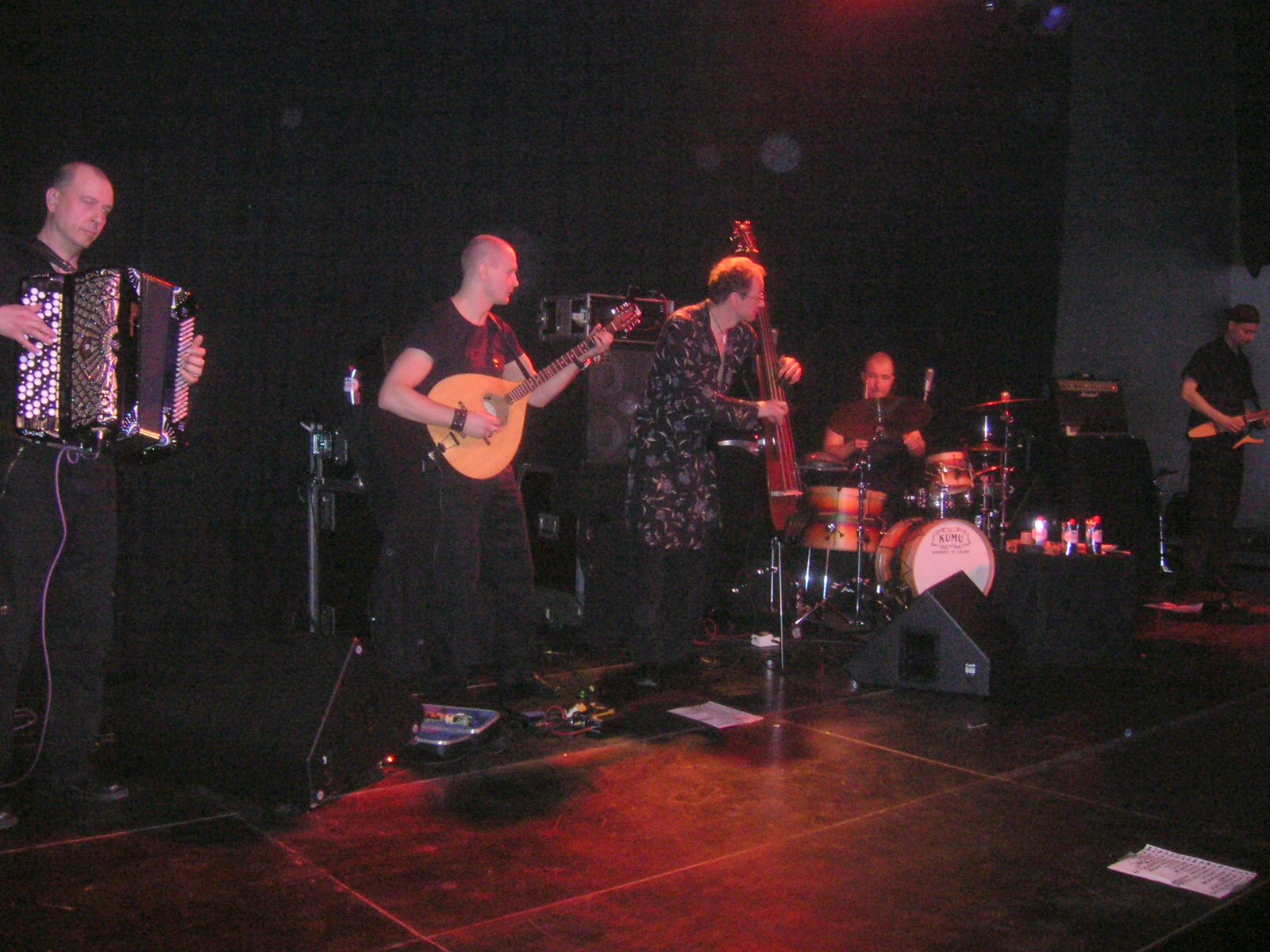
The band's instrumentalists in 2006

In the beginning of the 1990s, the whole aforementioned group had moved to Helsinki and started training at the Sibelius Academy. Sari started singing with the other girls, and the background line-up stabilized as consisting of Janne Lappalainen, Tommi Viksten, Tom Nyman, Riitta Potinoja, and Kari Reiman. Värttinä made a demo record which led to a recording contract with Sonet Records. The single "Marilaulu", released in the autumn, increased the public interest, and the album Oi Dai, released in the spring of 1991, became the band's breakthrough. They had now formed their style, which consisted of strong and energetic female singing, music pieces based on Finno-Ugric music traditions, and a band playing acoustic instruments. The style they created, mixing folk music into rock, jazz and popular music, was unheard of before.

The year 1992 brought a lot of concerts and the Emma Award, and some members were changed due to the tightening pace. In the end of the year, the album Seleniko was released with more compositions by the band than before. The record rose to the top of European world music charts and stayed there for three months. The album was released also in the United States, and the next year, when Oi Dai was released in the USA, too, the band started its first North American tour. Music from Seleniko (an excerpt from the track "Matalii ja mustii") was featured on the American children's television show Arthur.

After Seleniko, Antto Varilo became the guitarist and Pekka Lehti the bassist. On Aitara, recorded in the autumn of 1994, Anssi Nykänen plays the drums, but Marko Timonen played them live. The record made it to the charts again and it was remembered for the tracks "Tumala" and "Outona omilla mailla". The band toured North America and Europe. Many were interested in the women's distinctive way of singing, and they made an appearance on a record of Maggie Reilly.

Värttinä's sixth album, Kokko, was released in the end of 1996. The familiar note "trad." was not found in any of its songwriting credits, as all songs were written by the band. After the release of Kokko, Värttinä started its first tours in Japan and Australia, even though Sari Kaasinen had to leave the band for family reasons, and only three women were left as singers.

In August 1998 their seventh album, Vihma, was released under the record company Wicklow Records, established by Paddy Moloney from the band The Chieftains along with BMG. Värttinä's style can be said to have changed in Vihma. All compositions were made by the band's male members, and they contained more complex changes in time and also the singing melodies became rhythmically more diverse. Vihma made it to the charts around the world like its predecessors.

During the winter 1998–1999 Värttinä experienced another change of members. Susan Aho, originally joined to replace Riitta Kossi (previously Potinoja), became a permanent front-row singer, and Markku Lepistö joined to replace her as an accordionist. Riikka Väyrynen replaced the singer Sirpa Reiman.

In June 1999 Värttinä was awarded the BASF Master Award, given to artists, producers, recorders and studios for records gaining chart success while also displaying high technical and artistic quality. The award has previously been given to Metallica and Shania Twain. After the award Värttinä moved to the studio to record their next album, Ilmatar, released in the beginning of 2000. Ilmatar took the experimental and diverse style of Vihma even further. "Äijö" became the most popular song of this album, featured by singer Ismo Alanko. During the year, Värttinä toured Japan and Europe, ending the tour in the Savoy theatre in Helsinki, where a live album of the same name was recorded on 6 December. It was released in the beginning of the next year, simultaneously with the book Korkeelta ja kovvoo by Kimmo Nevalainen.

In 2001 Ilmatar was released in Brazil, and Värttinä performed in the Rock in Rio festival in Rio de Janeiro for more than 200,000 people. Värttinä's line-up was changed again, when Johanna Virtanen joined to replace Riikka Timonen (previously Väyrynen) who had left the band, and Jaakko Lukkarinen replaced the drummer Marko Timonen.

=== Rebirth ===
In 2002, the violinist Kari Reiman, bassist Pekka Lehti and original Värttinä singer Kirsi Kähkönen left the band. Reiman was replaced by Lassi Logrén, who had already been in the old Värttinä in his childhood. Hannu Rantanen became the bassist. Both had performed in the band before as substitutes. Värttinä thus started its "third era" with the singer trio Kaasinen-Aho-Virtanen. The first release with this line-up was Iki in 2003, when the band also celebrated its 20th anniversary.

Later that year Värttinä was invited to compose music for the Lord of the Rings theatrical adaptation, based on the book by J. R. R. Tolkien. Värttinä composed music for two and a half years together with A.R. Rahman, coordinated by Christopher Nightingale. The musical premiered in Toronto in 2006 and moved to London in May 2007.

In December 2005 Värttinä was awarded the Finland Prize, awarded yearly by the Finnish Ministry of Education for considerable artistic merits and remarkable professional achievements. In January 2006 Värttinä released their eleventh album, Miero. The album was the band's first made under Real World Records, established by Peter Gabriel.

In 2008, Värttinä toured Finland, Sweden, Norway, Poland, Germany, Italy, Spain, Portugal and Belgium, in support of their 25th-anniversary CD. The concert in Tampere (Finland) was filmed by Filmiteollisuus Oy and was broadcast on YLE Finnish national TV.

In late 2008, a new Värttinä book, Värttinä – Mierontiellä ja punaisella matolla, covering the story of Värttinä until then, was published in Finland. Janne Lappalainen and Markku Lepistö departed the band.

=== 2010s ===
In late 2009, Lassi Logrén and Antto Varilo departed the band. Accordionist and keyboard player Matti Kallio joined Värttinä.

In 2010, Susan Aho and Johanna Virtanen represented Finland at the Eurovision Song Contest in Oslo as Kuunkuiskaajat. Their song "Työlki ellää" finished 11th in the semi-final.

In February 2012 Värttinä released their 11th studio album, Utu. The album reached number one on the World Music Charts Europe in May. In October, Värttinä received the Womex Artist Award 2012 in Thessaloniki, Greece. Later it was announced that Karoliina Kantelinen would replace Johanna Virtanen in the line-up.

== Members ==
=== Current members ===
- Mari Kaasinen-Paaso (née Kaasinen) – vocals, kantele, accordion (1983–present)
- Lassi Logrén – vocals, violin, jouhikko, Jew's harp (1985–1989, 2002–present)
- Susan Venhovaara (née Aho) – vocals, accordion (1998–present)
- Hannu Rantanen – violin, double bass (?–present)
- Mikko Hassinen – drums, percussion (2012–present)
- Karoliina Kantelinen – vocals, kantele (2012–present)
- Matti Laitinen – guitar, mandocello (?–present)

=== Former members ===
- Minna Haikola – vocals, violin (1983–1986)
- Terhi Hirvonen – vocals, kantele (1983–1987)
- Sari Kaasinen – vocals, kantele, accordion (1983–1996)
- Kirsi Kähkönen – vocals, kantele (1983–2002)
- Janne Lappalainen – bouzouki, saxophone, wind instruments (1983–2008)
- Pauliina Luukkanen – vocals, violin (1983–1989)
- Nina Mononen – vocals, kantele (1983–1989)
- Heidi Pakarinen – vocals, kantele (1983–1989)
- Minna Rautianen – vocals, kantele (1983–1992)
- Sari Tyynelä – vocals, kantele (1983–1989)
- Jaana Vänskä – vocals, kantele (1983–1989)
- Jussi Kaasinen – vocals, kantele (1985–1989)
- Johanna Logrén – vocals, accordion (1985–1989)
- Tuomas Logrén – vocal, kantele, trumpet (1985–1989)
- Matleena Pekkanen – vocals, kantele (1985–1987)
- Saija Vänskä – vocals, kantele (1985–1989)
- Olli Varis – mandolin (1985–1989)
- Tapani Varis – bass, jouhikko (1985–1989)
- Nikko Prauda – bodhrán, percussion (1988–1989)
- Petri Hakala – mandocello (1989–1990)
- Christer Hackman – drums, percussion (1989–1991)
- Maria Kalaniemi – accordion (1989–1990)
- Tom Nyman – bass (1989–1993)
- Kari Reiman – violin (1989–2002)
- Sirpa Reiman – vocals (1989–1999)
- Tommi Viksten – guitar (1989–1992)
- Riitta Kossi (née Potinoja) – accordion (1990–1997)
- Reijo Heiskanen – guitar (1992–1993)
- Pekka Lehti – bass (1993–2002)
- Antto Varilo – guitar (1993–2008)
- Anssi Nykänen – drums, percussion (1994)
- Marko Timonen – drums, percussion (1994–2001)
- Markku Lepistö – accordion (1998–2008)
- Riikka Timonen (née Väyrynen) – vocals (1999–2001)
- Jaska Lukkarinen – drums, percussion (2000–2007)
- Johanna Hytti (née Virtanen) – vocals (2001–2012)
- Jaska Lukkarinen – drums, percussion (2001–2007)
- Hannu Rantanen – bass (2002–2013)
- Toni Porthen – percussion (2007–2011)
- Matti Kallio – keyboard (2009–2015)

== Discography ==
- Värttinä (1987)
- Musta Lindu (1989)
- Oi Dai (1991)
- Seleniko (1992)
- Aitara (1994)
- Kokko (1996)
- Vihma (1998)
- Ilmatar (2000)
- 6.12. (2001) released as Live in Helsinki in the United States (live album)
- Double Life (2002) – 2-CD compilation containing all of 6.12. and tracks from studio albums
- iki (2003)
- Snow Angel (2005) – compilation including songs from studio and live albums
- Miero (2006)
- 25 (2007) – compilation including songs from every album throughout their career with previously unreleased "Vipinäveet" from the Miero sessions
- Utu (2012)
- Viena (2015)
- Kyly (2025)

== Also appear on ==
- Arthur and Friends: The First Almost Real Not Live CD (or Tape), 1998 (Rounder Kids)
- Beginner's Guide to Scandinavia, 2011 (Nascente/Demon Music Group)
