= Xenophile Records =

- Parent company: Compass Records
- Founded: 1992
- Founder: Wendy Newton
- Distributor: Ryko Distribution
- Genre: World music
- Country of origin: U.S.
- Location: Nashville, Tennessee
- Official website: compassrecords.com

Xenophile Records is a Nashville, Tennessee based sublabel of Green Linnet Records that specializes in world music from Madagascar, Nigeria, Haiti, Chile, Argentina, Finland and other countries. The label was started in 1992 in Danbury, Connecticut by Wendy Newton as a subsidiary of Green Linnet. In 2006, Newton sold Green Linnet and Xenophile to Digital Music Group, an aggregator of downloadable music. DMG sold the rights to manufacture and distribute Green Linnet and Xenophile physical compact discs to Compass Records.

Artists released under the Xenophile label include Inti-Illimani, Värttinä, Boukan Ginen, Sabri Brothers, Chief I. K. Dairo MBE, Dembo Konte, Milli Bermejo, Daniel Diaz (musician), John Santos, Conjunto Céspedes, Boca Livre, The Klezmatics, Simbi and Tarika. The Xenophile catalog remains available through Compass/Green Linnet, which is based in Nashville.

== See also ==
- Compass Records
- Green Linnet Records
- Lists of record labels
