= Foreign relations of Brazil =

The Ministry of Foreign Affairs is responsible for managing the foreign relations of Brazil. Brazil has the largest economy in Latin America and is a key political and economic power on the world stage. Brazil's foreign policy reflects its role as a regional power and a potential world power and is designed to help protect the country's national interests, national security, ideological goals, and economic prosperity.

Between World War II and 1990, both democratic and military governments sought to expand Brazil's influence in the world by pursuing a state-led industrial policy and an independent foreign policy. Brazilian foreign policy has recently aimed to strengthen ties with other South American countries, engage in multilateral diplomacy through the United Nations and the Organization of American States, and act at times as a countervailing force to U.S. political and economic influence in Latin America.

== Overview ==
The President has ultimate authority over foreign policy, while Congress is tasked with reviewing and considering all diplomatic nominations and international treaties, as well as legislation relating to Brazilian foreign policy.

The Ministry of Foreign Affairs, also known metonymically as Itamaraty, is the government department responsible for advising the President and conducting Brazil's foreign relations with other countries and international bodies. Itamaraty's scope includes political, commercial, economic, financial, cultural and consular relations, areas in which it performs the classical tasks of diplomacy: represent, inform and administer. Foreign policy priorities are established by the President.

== Foreign policy ==
Brazil's foreign policy is a by-product of the country's unique position as a regional power in Latin America, a leader among developing countries, and an emerging world power. Brazilian foreign policy has generally been based on the principles of multilateralism, peaceful dispute settlement, and non-intervention in the affairs of other countries. Brazil engages in multilateral diplomacy through the Organization of American States and the United Nations, and has increased ties with developing countries in Africa and Asia. Brazil is currently commanding a multinational U.N. stabilization force in Haiti, the MINUSTAH. Instead of pursuing unilateral prerogatives, Brazilian foreign policy has tended to emphasize regional integration, first through the Southern Cone Common Market (Mercosul) and now the Union of South American Nations. Brazil is also committed to cooperation with other Portuguese-speaking nations through joint-collaborations with the rest of the Portuguese-speaking world, in several domains which include military cooperation, financial aid, and cultural exchange. This is done in the framework of CPLP, for instance. Lula da Silva visit to Africa in 2003 included State visits to three Portuguese-speaking African nations (Angola, São Tomé and Príncipe, and Mozambique). Finally, Brazil is also strongly committed in the development and restoration of peace in East Timor, where it has a very powerful influence.

Brazil's political, business, and military ventures are complemented by the country's trade policy. In Brazil, the Ministry of Foreign Relations continues to dominate trade policy, causing the country's commercial interests to be (at times) subsumed by a larger foreign policy goal, namely, enhancing Brazil's influence in Latin America and the world. For example, while concluding meaningful trade agreements with developed countries (such as the United States and the European Union) would probably be beneficial to Brazil's long-term economic self-interest, the Brazilian government has instead prioritized its leadership role within Mercosul and expanded trade ties with countries in Africa, Asia and the Middle East.

Brazil's soft power diplomacy involves institutional strategies such as the formation of diplomatic coalitions to constrain the power of the established great powers. In recent years, it has given high priority in establishing political dialogue with other strategic actors such as India, Russia, China and South Africa through participation in international groupings such as BASIC, IBSA and BRICS. The BRICS states have been amongst the most powerful drivers of incremental change in world diplomacy and they benefit most from the connected global power shifts.

=== Workers' Party administration: 2003-2016 ===
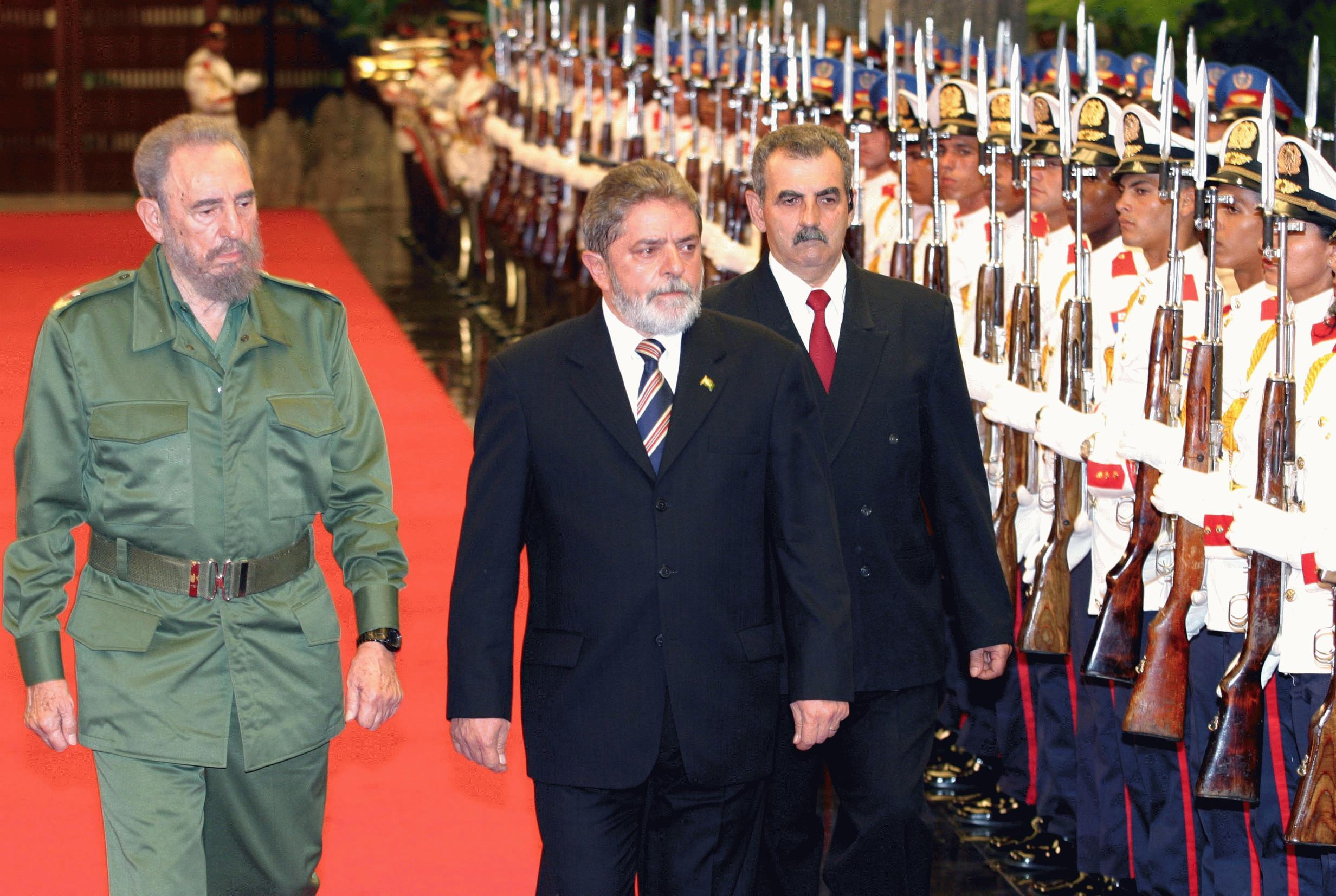
Lula and Cuban leader Fidel Castro, 2003

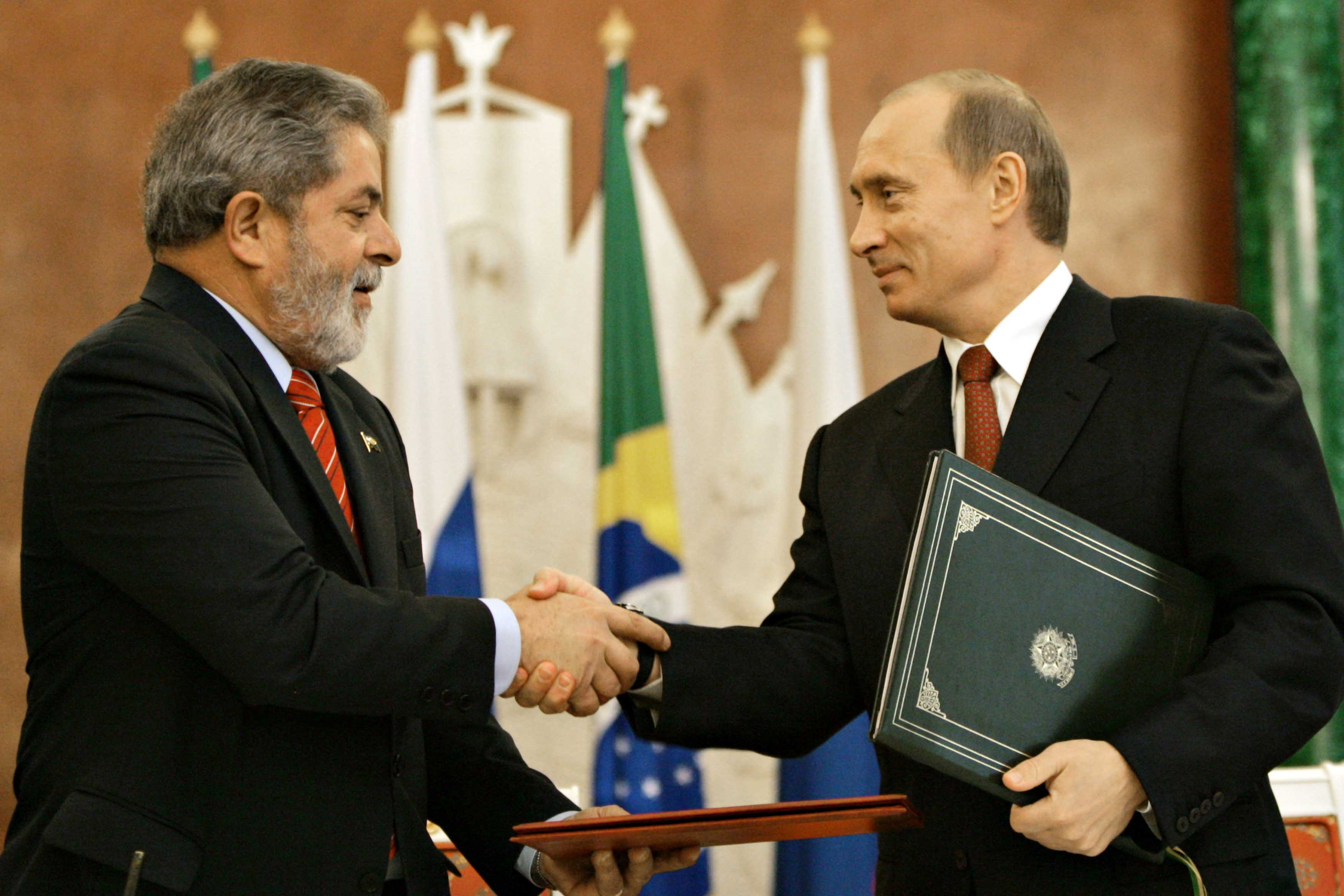
Lula with President of Russia Vladimir Putin, 2005

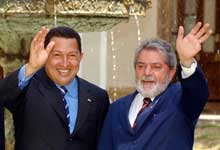
Lula and Venezuelan President Hugo Chavez, 2005

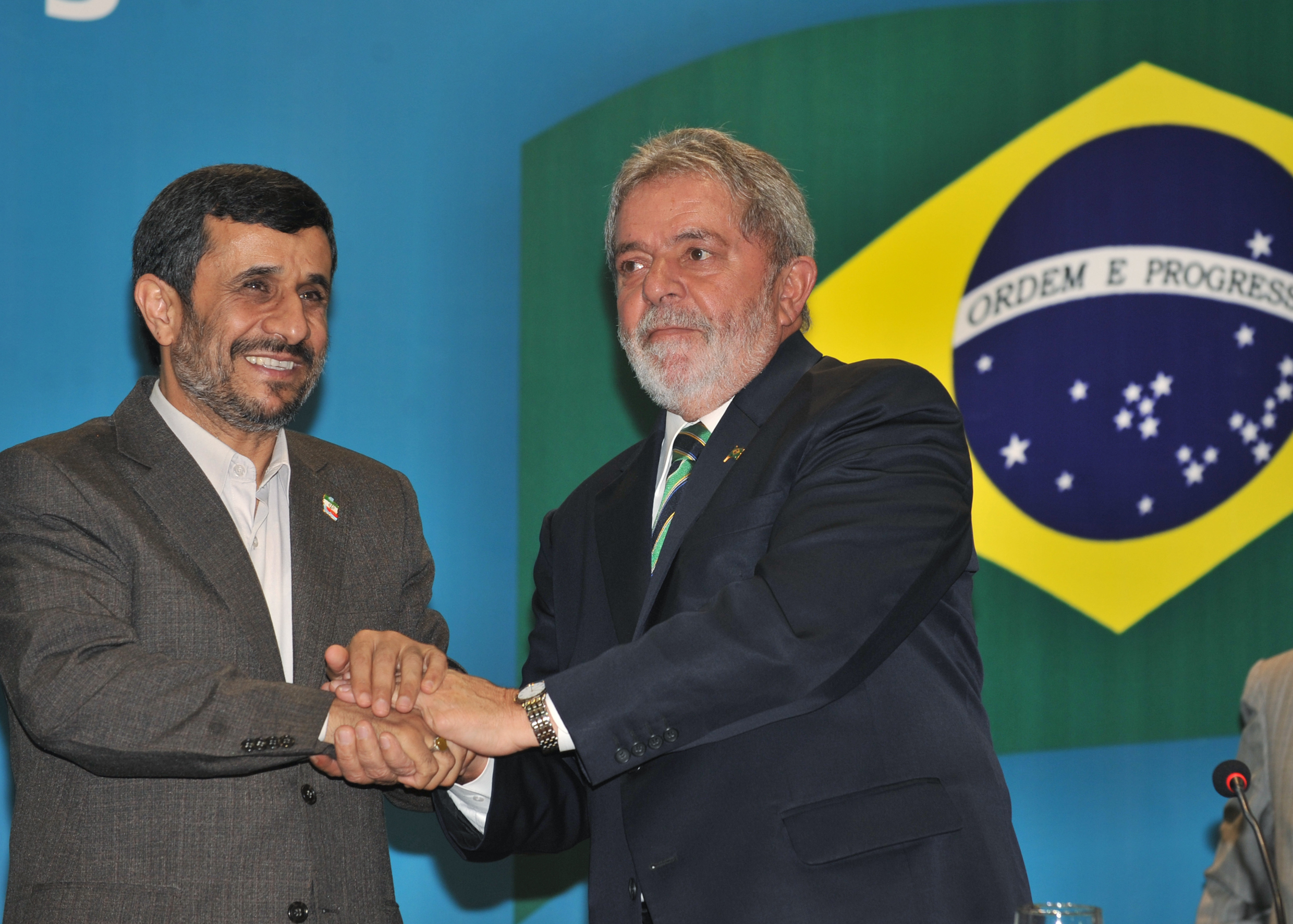
Lula with Iranian president Ahmadinejad, 2009

The Brazilian foreign policy under the Lula da Silva administration (2003–2010) focused on the following directives: to contribute toward the search for greater equilibrium and attenuate unilateralism; to strengthen bilateral and multilateral relations in order to increase the country's weight in political and economic negotiations on an international level; to deepen relations so as to benefit from greater economical, financial, technological and cultural interchange; to avoid agreements that could jeopardize development in the long term.

These directives implied precise emphasis on: the search for political coordination with emerging and developing countries, namely India, South Africa, Russia and China; creation of the Union of South American Nations and its derivative bodies, such as the South American Security Council; strengthening of Mercosul; projection at the Doha Round and WTO; maintenance of relations with developed countries, including the United States; undertaking and narrowing of relations with African countries; campaign for the reform of the United Nations Security Council and for a permanent seat for Brazil; and defense of social objectives allowing for a greater equilibrium between the States and populations.

From 2003 to 2010, Lula embraced China as central to reforming what he considered an unjust global order. Lula stated Brazil's commitment to the One China principle that is the position held by the People's Republic of China and the ruling Chinese Communist Party, saying that the government of the People's Republic of China was the sole legal government representing the whole of China, including Taiwan—as part of China.

Under Lula, Brazil provided money and corporate support to Cuba. The state-controlled Brazilian oil company Petrobras studied the possibility of drilling for oil off of Cuba, while the Odebrecht construction firm headed a revamp of the Cuban port of Mariel into the island's main commercial port. Brazil's state-run Brazilian Development Bank gave $300 million to Odebrecht to build new roads, rail lines, wharves, and warehouses at Mariel. Brazil also offered Cuba up to $1 billion in credit lines to pay for Brazilian goods and services.

In November 2007, Lula defended Venezuela's president Hugo Chávez as the democratic choice of his people. He said: "There is no risk with Chávez." Expressing his admiration for Chávez, he said "Only thanks to Chávez’s leadership, the people [of Venezuela] have had extraordinary achievements," and that in 2008 that Chávez was "the best president the country has had in 100 years."

The foreign policy of the Rousseff administration (2011–2016) sought to deepen Brazil's regional commercial dominance and diplomacy, expand Brazil's presence in Africa, and play a major role in the G20 on global warming and in other multilateral settings. At the United Nations, Brazil continues to oppose Economic sanctions and foreign military intervention, while seeking to garner support for a permanent seat at the Security Council. Cooperation with other emerging powers remain a top priority in Brazil's global diplomatic strategy. On the recent airstrike resolution supporting military action in Libya, Brazil joined fellow BRICS in the Council and abstained. On the draft resolution condemning violence in Syria, Brazil worked with India and South Africa to try to bridge the Western powers' divide with Russia and China.

=== Bolsonaro administration, 2019-2022 ===
After Rousseff's impeachment, Brazil started reconnecting with its western allies. In 2019 Jair Bolsonaro succeeded Michel Temer. The new foreign policy focused on a rapprochement with major governments especially the United States and Colombia in the Americas; Israel, Japan and South Korea in Asia; United Kingdom, Italy and Greece in Europe. The Brazil–Portugal relations were also strengthened, and despite disagreements over the crisis in Venezuela, Brazil remained close to the BRICS countries.

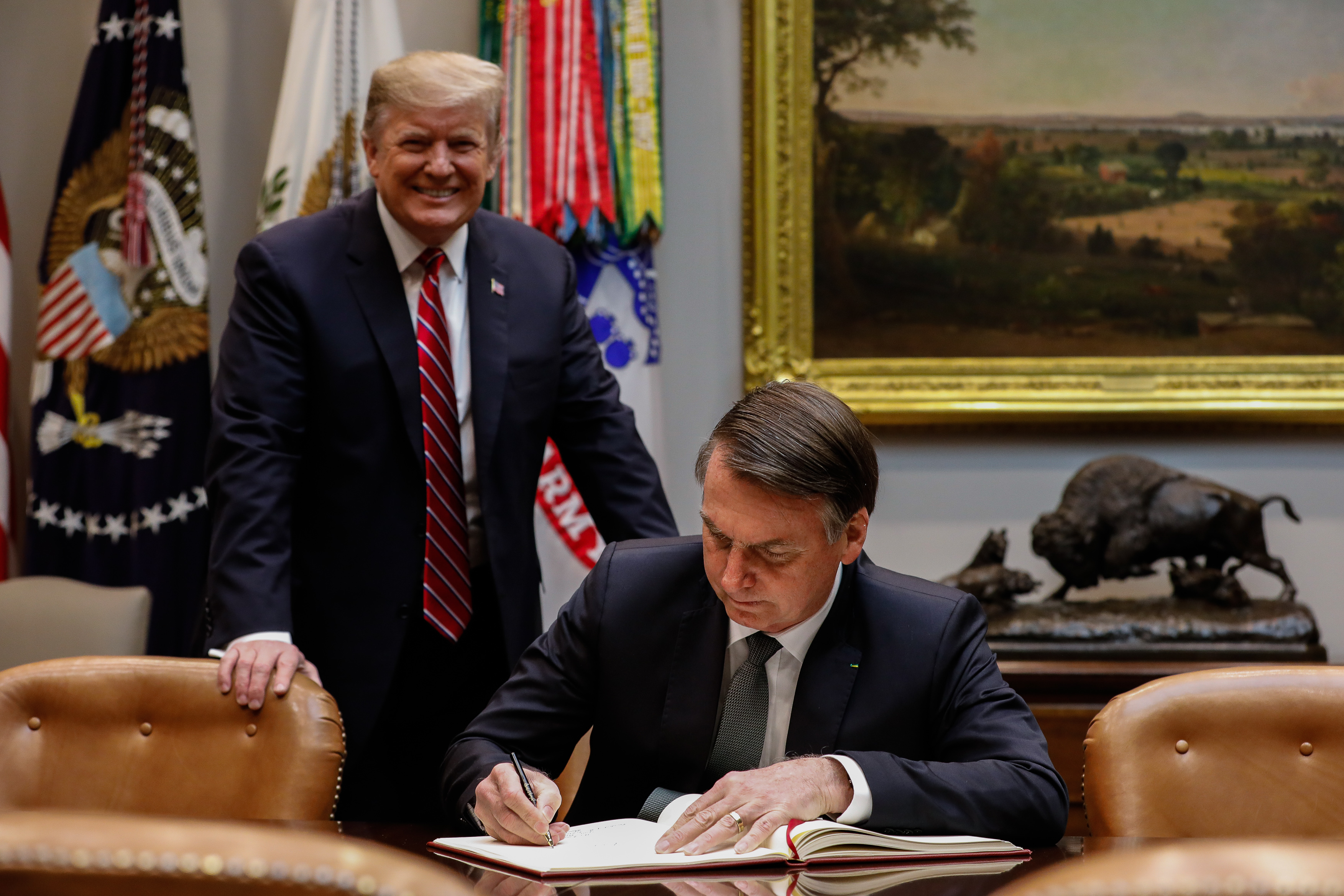
Bolsonaro with United States President Donald Trump at the White House, 19 March 2019

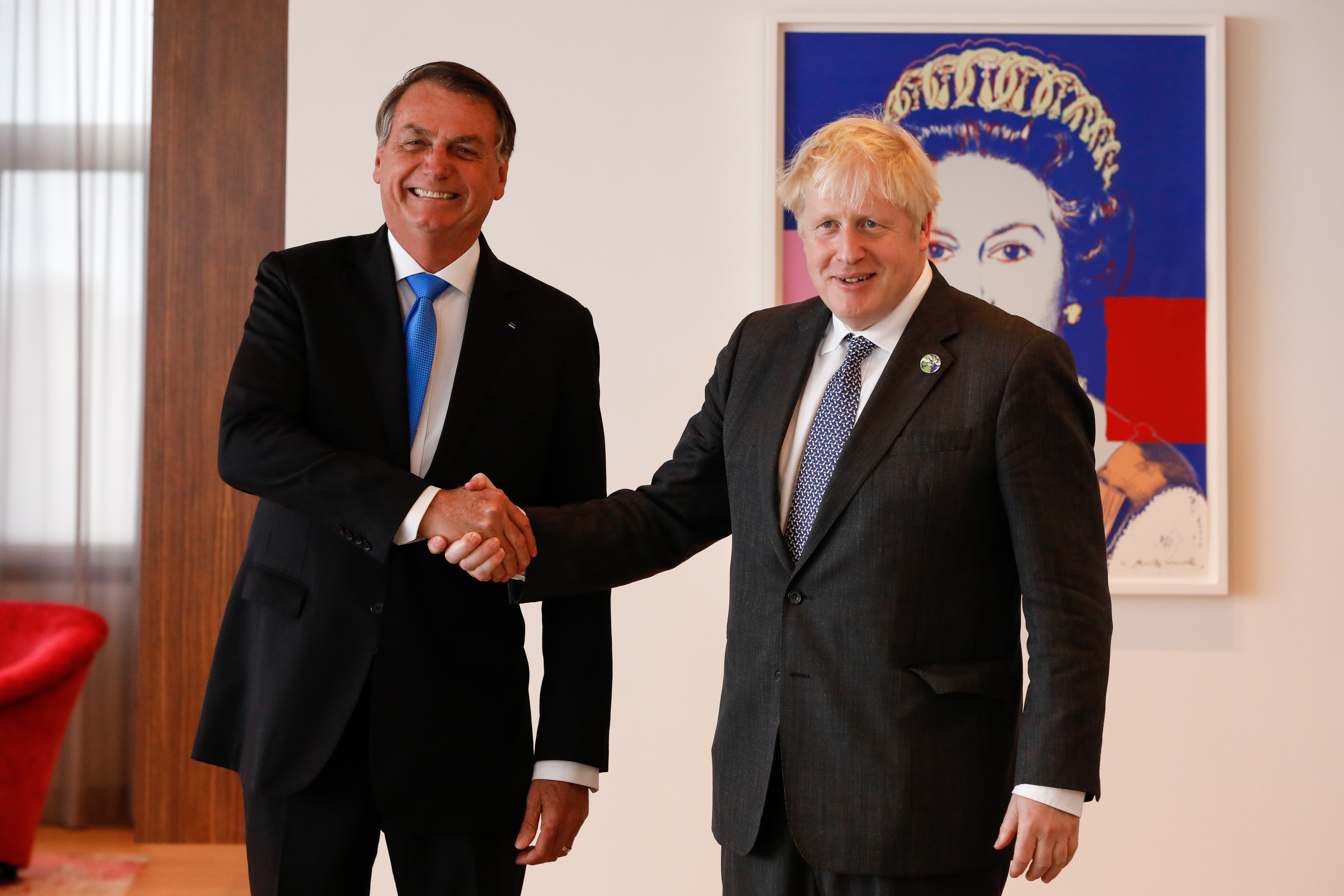
Bolsonaro with United Kingdom Prime Minister Boris Johnson, 20 September 2021

During the 2018 presidential campaign, Bolsonaro said he would make considerable changes to Brazil's foreign relations, saying that the "Itamaraty needs to be in service of the values that were always associated with the Brazilian people". He also said that the country should stop "praising dictators" and attacking democracies, such as the United States, Israel and Italy. In early 2018, he affirmed that his "trip to the five democratic countries the United States, Israel, Japan, South Korea, and Taiwan showed who we will be and we would like to join good people". Bolsonaro has shown distrust towards China throughout the presidential campaign claiming they "[want to] buy Brazil", although Brazil recorded a US$20 billion trade surplus with China in 2018, and China is only the 13th largest source of foreign direct investment into Brazil. Bolsonaro said he wishes to continue to have business with the Chinese but he also said that Brazil should "make better [economic] deals" with other countries, with no "ideological agenda" behind it. His stance towards China has also been interpreted as an attempt to curry favor from the Trump administration to garner concessions from the US. However, Bolsonaro has mostly changed his position on China after he took office, saying that the two countries were "born to walk together" during his visit to Beijing in October 2019. He has also said that Brazil will stay out of the ongoing China-U.S. trade war.

Bolsonaro said that his first international trip as president would be to Israel. Bolsonaro also said that the State of Palestine "is not a country, so there should be no embassy here", adding that "you don't negotiate with terrorists." The announcement was warmly received by the prime minister of Israel, Benjamin Netanyahu, who welcomed Bolsonaro to Israel in March 2019 during the final weeks of a re-election campaign, but was met with condemnation from the Arab League, which warned Bolsonaro it could damage diplomatic ties. "I love Israel," Bolsonaro said in Hebrew at a welcoming ceremony, with Netanyahu at his side, at Tel Aviv's Ben-Gurion airport.

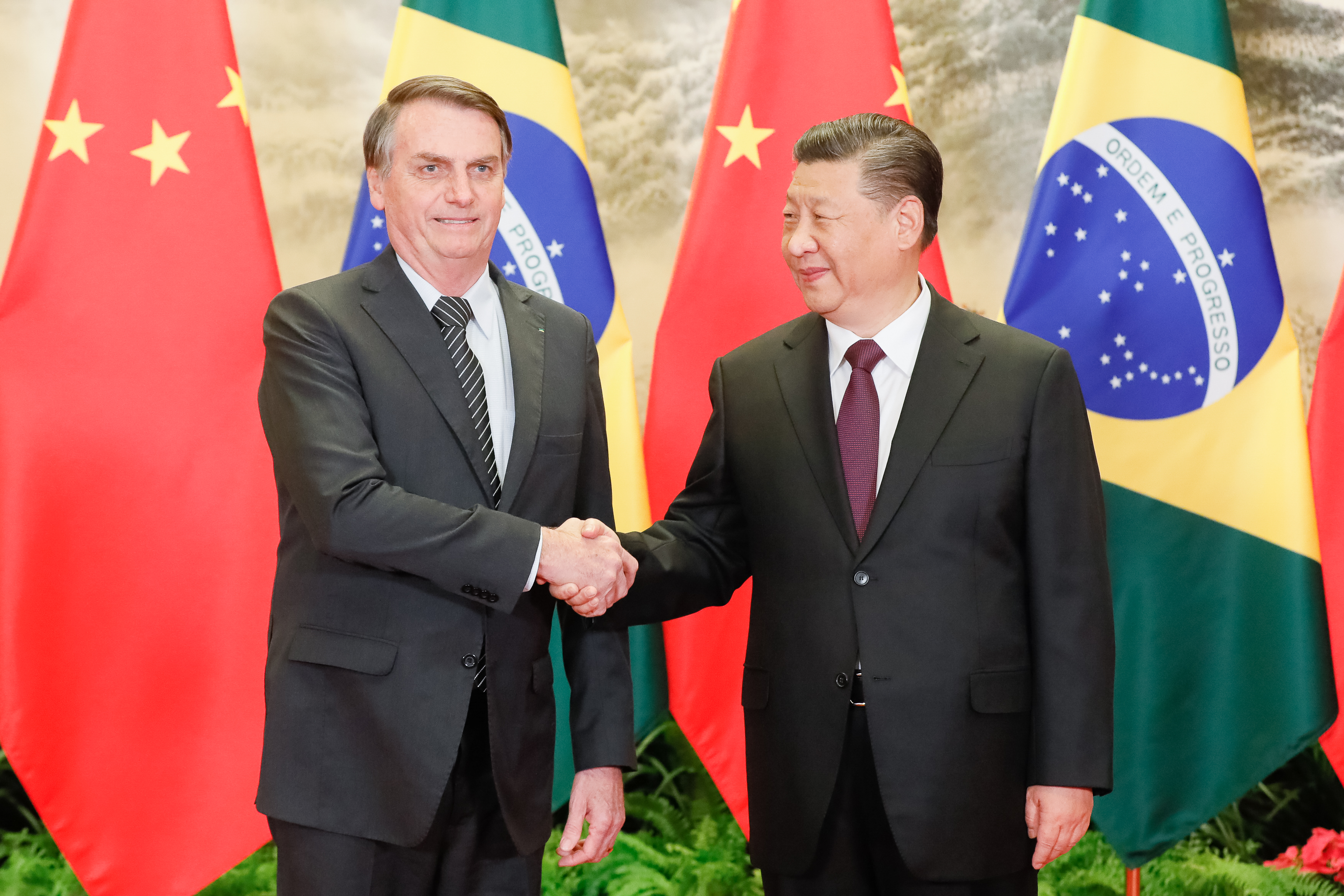
President Bolsonaro with General Secretary of the Chinese Communist Party Xi Jinping in October 2019

Bolsonaro also praised U.S. President Donald Trump and his foreign policy, and has been called "the tropical Trump". His son Eduardo has indicated that Brazil should distance itself from Iran, sever ties with Nicolás Maduro's government in Venezuela and relocate Brazil's embassy in Israel to Jerusalem. Bolsonaro is widely considered the most pro-American candidate in Brazil since the 1980s. PSL members said that if elected, he would dramatically improve relations between the United States and Brazil. During an October 2017 campaign rally in Miami, he saluted the American flag and led chants of "USA! USA!" to a large crowd. U.S. National Security Advisor John Bolton praised Bolsonaro as a "like-minded" partner and said his victory was a "positive sign" for Latin America.

At the regional level, Bolsonaro praised Argentine President Mauricio Macri for ending the 12-year rule of Néstor and Cristina Fernández de Kirchner, which he saw as similar to Lula and Rousseff. Although he does not have plans to leave the Mercosur, he criticized it for prioritizing ideological issues over economic ones. A staunch anti-communist, Bolsonaro has condemned Cuba's former leader Fidel Castro and the current regime in that island.

Bolsonaro praised British Prime Minister Winston Churchill, saying that he had learned from Churchill: "Patriotism, love for your fatherland, respect for your flag – something that has been lost over the last few years here in Brazil ... and governing through example, especially at that difficult moment of the Second World War." Bolsonaro said he's open to the possibility of hosting a U.S. military base in Brazil to counter Russian influence in the region. With the intention to persuade Trump to make Brazil a NATO member in March 2019, Bolsonaro said: "the discussions with the United States will begin in the coming months".

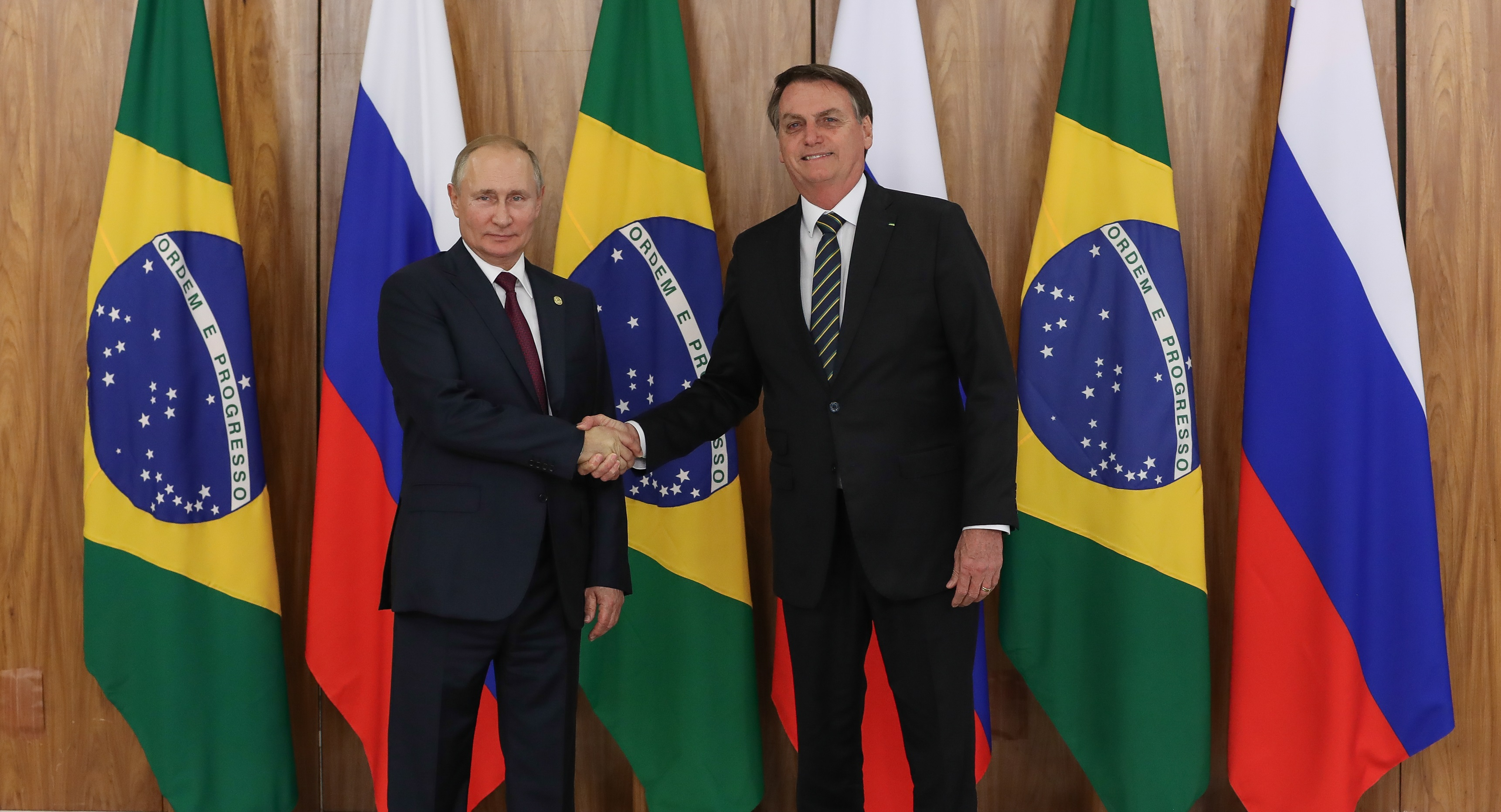
Bolsonaro with Russian President Vladimir Putin in November 2019

With formal U.S. support for Brazil's entry to OECD in May 2019, Bolsonaro said, "currently, all 36 members of the organization support the entry of the country, fruit of confidence in the new Brazil being built, more free, open and fair". In October 2019, on a state visit to China, he announced the end of the need for visas for Chinese and Indian entry into Brazil. Brazil had already removed the need for visas for people from the U.S., Canada, Japan, and Australia.

=== Lula second presidency, 2023-present ===
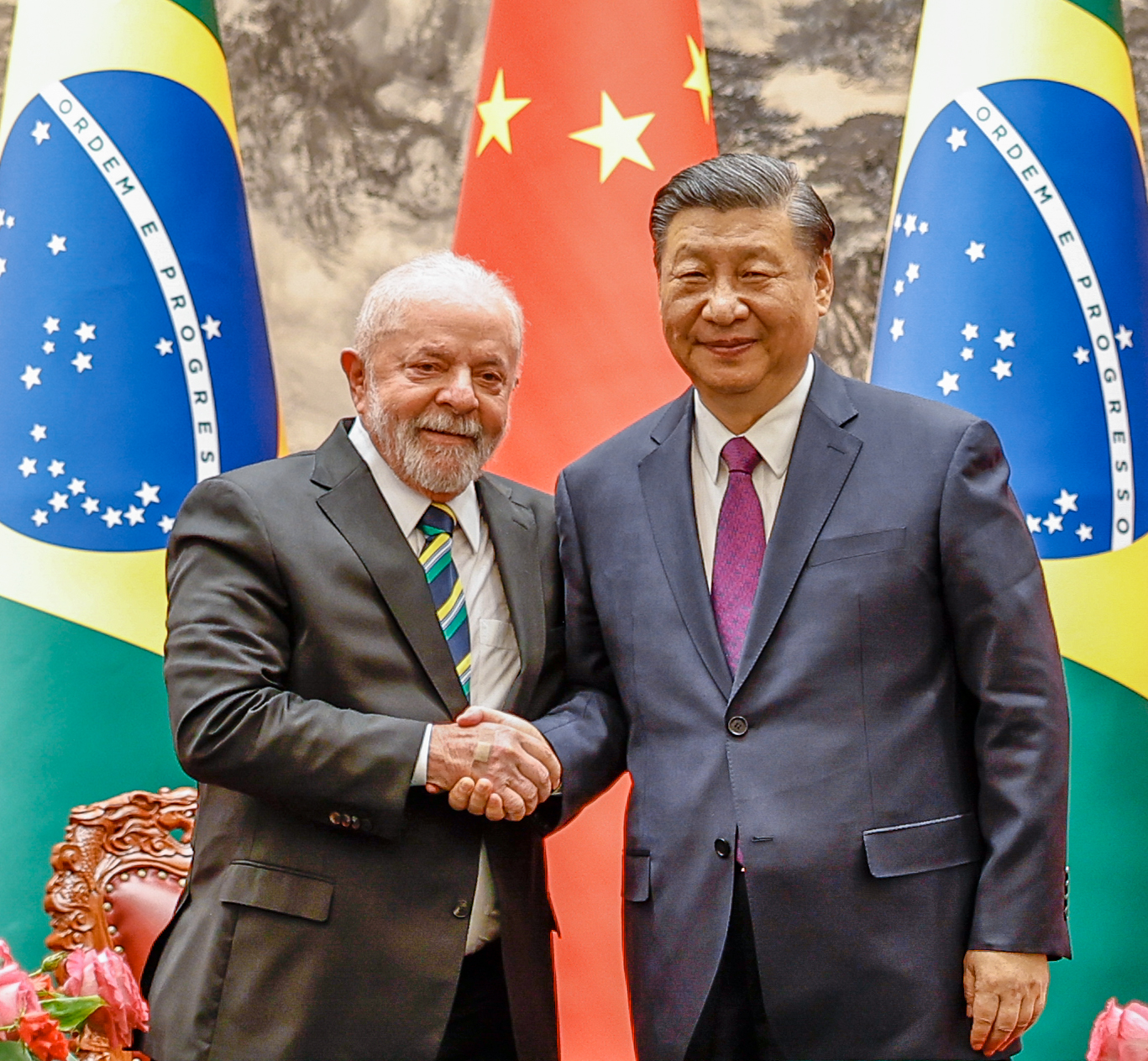
President Lula and General Secretary of the Chinese Communist Party Xi Jinping, April 2023

In May 2022, Lula placed blame for Russia's invasion of Ukraine on Ukrainian president Volodymyr Zelenskyy, saying "This guy is as responsible as Putin for the war". Lula also repeatedly attacked NATO and the European Union as having caused the war. After Germany appealed to Lula to provide military aid to Ukraine by selling it arms, Lula refused. In December 2023, Lula said that he will invite Vladimir Putin to Brazil. In February 2024, he was visited by Russian Foreign Minister Sergey Lavrov.

In November 2023, Lula met in Riyadh with the prime minister and crown prince of Saudi Arabia, Mohammed bin Salman. They discussed strengthening bilateral relations, and investments in both countries. Salman said that a more robust strategic partnership between the two countries would benefit both sides. The $10 billion that the sovereign wealth fund of Saudi Arabia pledged to invest in Brazil was one topic of conversation. Lula mentioned Brazil's rapprochement with Arab countries. Salman also discussed Saudi Arabia's entry into BRICS in January 2024. Lula invited Salman to visit Brazil in 2024.

== Regional policy ==
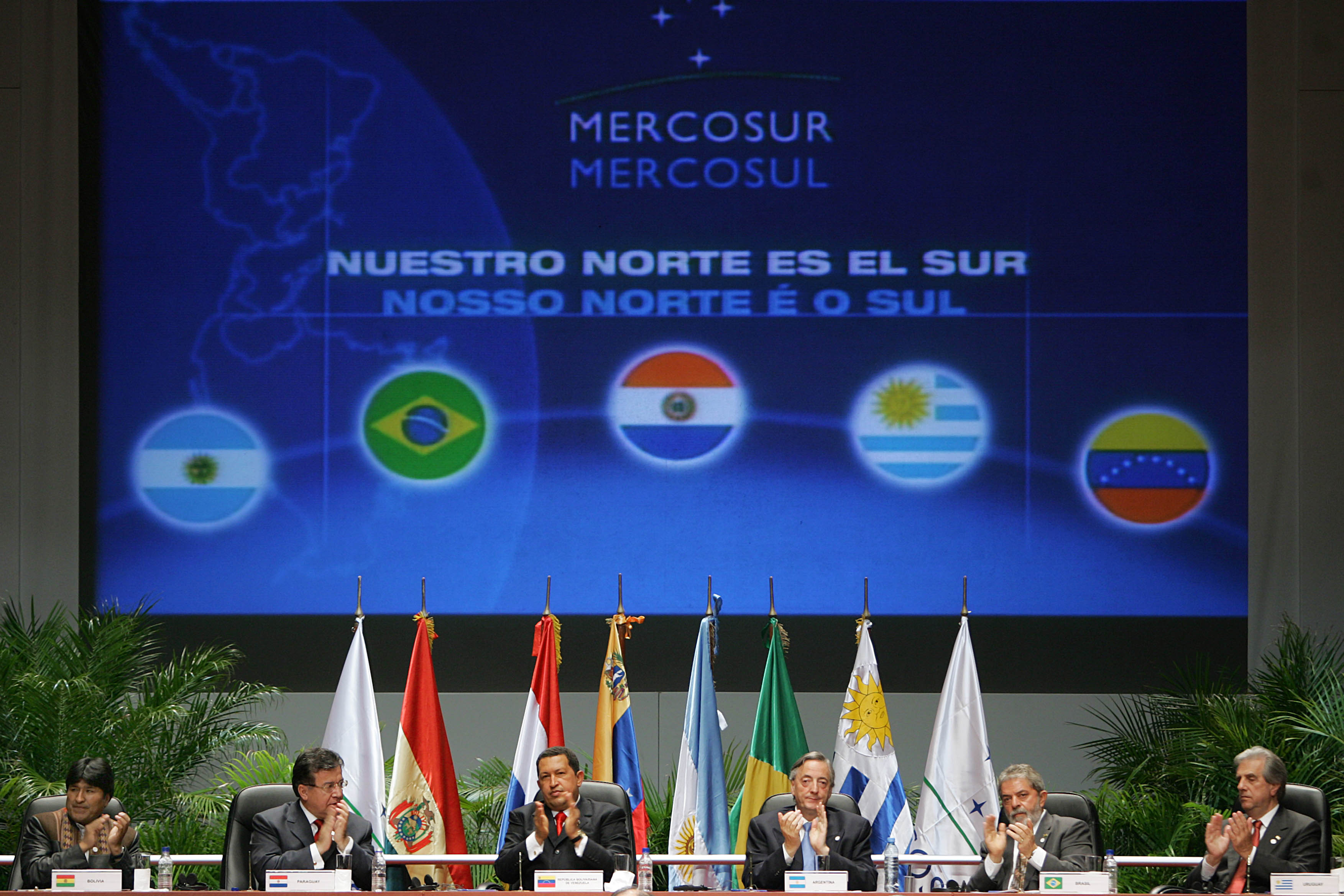
Mercosur, a regional trade bloc between Argentina, Brazil, Paraguay, Uruguay, and Venezuela.

Over the first decade of the 21st century, Brazil has firmly established itself as a regional power. It has traditionally, if controversially, been a leader in the inter-American community and played an important role in collective security efforts, as well as in economic cooperation in the Western Hemisphere. Brazilian foreign policy supports economic and political integration efforts in order to reinforce long-standing relationships with its neighbors. It is a founding member of the Organization of American States (OAS) and the Inter-American Treaty of Reciprocal Assistance (Rio Treaty). It has given high priority to expanding relations with its South American neighbors and strengthening regional bodies such as the Latin American Integration Association (ALADI), the Union of South American Nations (UNASUR) and Mercosur. Although integration is the primary purpose of these organizations, they also serve as forums in which Brazil can exercise its leadership and develop consensus around its positions on regional and global issues. Most scholars agree that by promoting integration through organizations like Mercosur and UNASUR, Brazil has been able to solidify its role as a regional power. In addition to consolidating its power within South America, Brazil has sought to expand its influence in the broader region by increasing its engagement in the Caribbean and Central America., although some think this is still a fragile, ongoing process, that can be thwarted by secondary regional powers in South America.

In April 2019 Brazil left Union of South American Nations (UNASUR) to become a member of Forum for the Progress and Development of South America (PROSUR). In January 2020, Brazil suspended its participation in the Community of Latin American and Caribbean States, (CELAC). Later, Brazil rejoined CELAC on 1 May 2023 and rejoined UNASUR on 5 May 2023.

Brazil regularly extends export credits and university scholarships to its Latin American neighbors. In recent years, the Brazilian Development Bank (BNDES) has provided US$5 billion worth of loans to countries in the region. Brazil has also increasingly provided Latin American nations with financial aid and technical assistance. Between 2005 and 2009, Cuba, Haiti, and Honduras were the top three recipients of Brazilian assistance, receiving over $50 million annually.

In November 2019, Brazil made a historic move to break with the rest of Latin America on the U.S. embargo of Cuba, becoming the first Latin American country in twenty-six years to vote against condemning the U.S.-led embargo of Cuba at the United Nations General Assembly.

== United Nations politics ==
Brazil is a founding member of the United Nations and participates in all of its specialized agencies. It has participated in 33 United Nations peacekeeping missions and contributed with over 27,000 soldiers. Brazil has been a member of the United Nations Security Council ten times, most recently 2010–2011. Along with Japan, Brazil has been elected more times to the Security Council than any other U.N. member state.

Brazil is currently seeking a permanent seat on the United Nations Security Council. It is a member of the G4, an alliance among Brazil, Germany, India, and Japan for the purpose of supporting each other's bids for permanent seats on the Security Council. They propose the Security Council be expanded beyond the current 15 members to include 25 members. The G4 countries argue that a reform would render the body "more representative, legitimate, effective and responsive" to the realities of the international community in the 21st century.

== Outstanding international issues ==
- Two short sections of the border with Uruguay are in dispute - the Arroio Invernada area of the Quaraí River, and the Brazilian Island at the confluence of the Quaraí River and the Uruguay River.
- Brazil declared in 1986 the sector between 28°W to 53°W Brazilian Antarctica (Antártica Brasileira) as its Zone of Interest. It overlaps Argentine and British claims
- In 2004, the country submitted its claims to the United Nations Commission on the Limits of the Continental Shelf (CLCS) to extend its maritime continental margin.

== Foreign aid ==
Overseas aid has become an increasingly important tool for Brazil's foreign policy. Brazil provides aid through the Brazilian Agency of Cooperation (Abbreviation: ABC; Portuguese: Agência Brasileira de Cooperação), in addition to offering scientific, economical, and technical support. More than half of Brazilian aid is provided to Africa, whereas Latin America receives around 20% of Brazilian aid. The share of aid allocated to the Asian continent is small. Within Africa, more than 80% of Brazilian aid is received by Portuguese-speaking countries. Brazil concentrates its aid for Portuguese-speaking countries in the education sector, specially in secondary and post-secondary education, but it is more committed to agricultural development in other countries. Estimated to be around $1 billion annually, Brazil is on par with China and India and ahead of many more traditional donor countries. The aid tends to consist of technical aid and expertise, alongside a quiet non-confrontational diplomacy to development results. Brazil's aid demonstrates a developing pattern of South-South aid, which has been heralded as a 'global model in waiting'. Some studies have suggested that, by giving aid, Brazil could be trying to get access to mineral and energy resources.

== Participation in international organizations ==
ACS^{(Observer)} • ACTO • AfDB • ALECSO^{(Observer)} • BIS • CAF-BDLAC^{(Associate)} • Cairns Group • CAN^{(Associate)} • CDB • CPLP • FAO • G4 • BASIC countries • G8+5 • G15 • G20 • G20+ • G24 • G77 • IADB • IDB • IAEA • IBRD • IBSA •ICAO • ICC • ICRM • IDA • IFAD • IFC • IFRCS • IHO • ILO • IMF • IMO • Inmarsat •INSARAG • Intelsat • Interpol • IOC • IOM • ISO • ITU • LAES • LAIA • Mercosul • MINUSTAH • NAM^{(Observer)} • NSG • OAS • OEI • OPANAL • OPCW • PCA • Rio Group • Rio Treaty • UN • UNASUR • UNCTAD • UNESCO • UNHCR • UNIDO • UNITAR • UNMIL • UNMIS • UNMOVIC • UNOCI • UNTAET • UNWTO • UPU • WCO • WHO • WIPO • WMO • WTO • ZPCAS

== Diplomatic relations ==
Brazil has a large global network of diplomatic missions and diplomatic relations. As of 2019, Brazil's diplomatic network consisted of 194 overseas posts.

Relations with non-UN members or observers:

- Kosovo - Brazil does not recognize Kosovo as an independent state and has announced it has no plans to do so without an agreement with Serbia. However, Brazil accepts the Kosovan passport.
- Taiwan - Brazil does not recognize the Republic of China as it has recognized the People's Republic of China, although it has non-diplomatic relations and maintains a special office in Taiwan. Brazil also accepts the Taiwan passport.

=== List ===
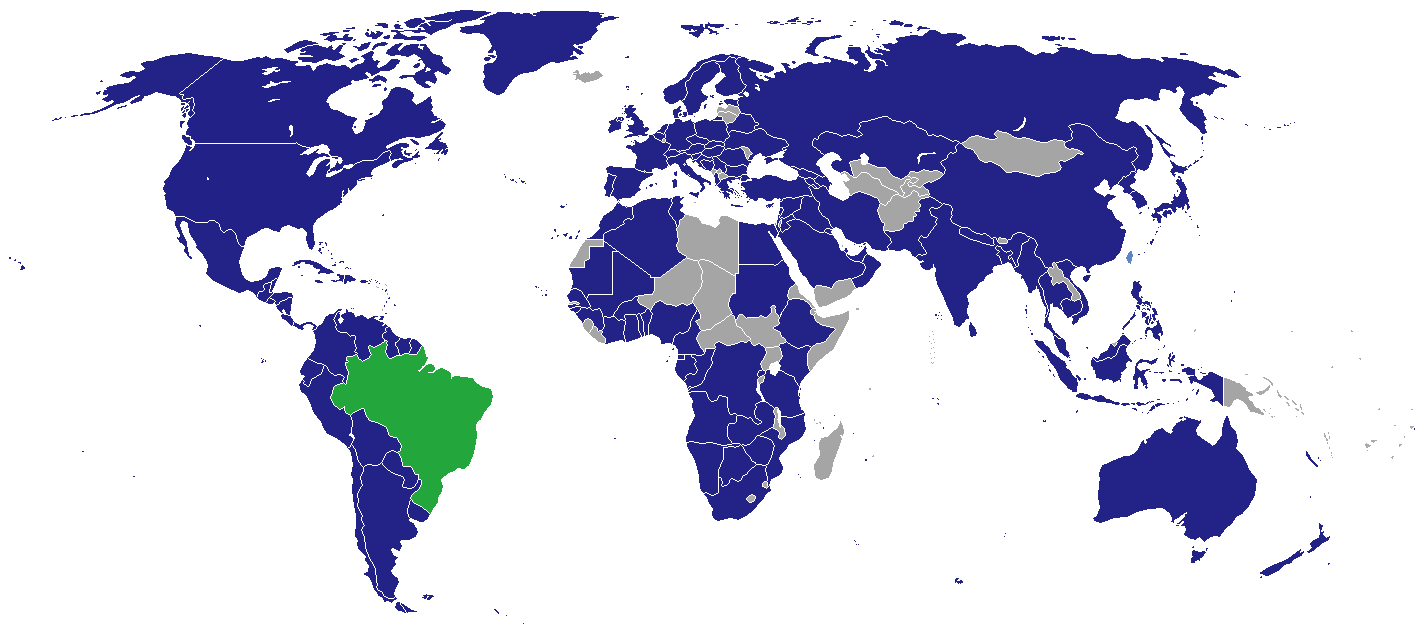
Diplomatic missions of Brazil Brazil Nations hosting a diplomatic mission of Brazil Nations with a non-resident mission of Brazil

List of countries which Brazil maintains diplomatic relations with:

#	Country	Date
1	Argentina	5 August 1823
2	United States	26 May 1824
3	Portugal	29 August 1825
4	France	20 October 1825
5	United Kingdom	1825
6	Sweden	5 January 1826
—	Holy See	23 January 1826
7	Netherlands	12 October 1826
8	Peru	3 February 1827
9	Denmark	26 April 1828
10	Russia	3 October 1828
11	Uruguay	29 September 1829
12	Belgium	27 February 1834
13	Mexico	30 May 1834
14	Spain	6 June 1834
15	Chile	22 April 1836
16	Venezuela	5 August 1843
17	Paraguay	14 September 1844
18	Ecuador	22 November 1844
19	Switzerland	31 January 1857
20	Italy	6 February 1857
21	Bolivia	27 March 1867
22	Japan	5 November 1895
23	Iran	17 June 1903
24	Panama	2 March 1904
25	Honduras	16 November 1906
26	Guatemala	22 November 1906
27	Nicaragua	22 November 1906
28	Cuba	13 December 1906
29	El Salvador	1906
30	Colombia	24 April 1907
31	Costa Rica	21 June 1907
32	Norway	11 May 1908
33	Luxembourg	15 April 1911
34	Dominican Republic	19 April 1911
35	Greece	6 June 1911
36	Poland	27 May 1920
37	Czech Republic	June 1920
38	Egypt	27 February 1924
39	Austria	26 May 1925
40	Turkey	8 September 1927
41	Hungary	1927
42	Romania	7 January 1928
43	Haiti	1928
44	Finland	8 April 1929
45	Bulgaria	17 September 1934
46	Serbia	15 June 1938
47	Canada	14 November 1940
48	Australia	7 June 1945
49	Lebanon	13 November 1945
50	Syria	13 November 1945
51	Philippines	4 July 1946
52	South Africa	31 January 1948
53	India	6 April 1948
54	Ethiopia	9 January 1951
55	Pakistan	January 1951
56	Germany	10 July 1951
—	Sovereign Military Order of Malta	6 December 1951
57	Israel	8 April 1952
58	Iceland	28 April 1952
59	Afghanistan	1952
60	Indonesia	March 1953
61	Jordan	6 April 1959
62	Thailand	17 April 1959
63	Malaysia	11 August 1959
64	Tunisia	7 October 1959
65	South Korea	31 October 1959
66	Morocco	27 November 1959
67	Sri Lanka	22 January 1960
68	Ghana	2 March 1960
69	Cambodia	8 November 1960
70	Albania	4 April 1961
71	Senegal	26 April 1961
72	Benin	17 May 1961
73	Mauritania	17 May 1961
74	Nigeria	16 August 1961
75	Mali	24 January 1962
76	Jamaica	14 October 1962
77	Togo	26 October 1962
78	Algeria	28 November 1962
79	Cyprus	21 July 1964
80	New Zealand	13 October 1964
81	Trinidad and Tobago	21 January 1965
82	Libya	9 April 1967
83	Kenya	4 July 1967
84	Singapore	2 November 1967
85	Iraq	1 December 1967
86	Kuwait	20 January 1968
87	Democratic Republic of the Congo	21 June 1968
88	Guyana	26 August 1968
89	Sudan	10 October 1968
90	Ivory Coast	31 October 1968
91	Saudi Arabia	23 December 1968
92	Uganda	22 December 1969
93	Zambia	28 December 1969
94	Tanzania	5 January 1970
95	Barbados	26 November 1971
96	Bangladesh	15 May 1972
97	Gabon	11 January 1974
98	Qatar	20 May 1974
99	United Arab Emirates	10 June 1974
100	Oman	3 July 1974
101	Mauritius	9 August 1974
102	Sierra Leone	9 August 1974
103	China	15 August 1974
104	Guinea	4 September 1974
105	Guinea-Bissau	22 November 1974
106	Equatorial Guinea	26 May 1975
107	Malta	23 June 1975
108	Ireland	1 September 1975
109	Burkina Faso	8 October 1975
110	Niger	24 October 1975
111	Angola	12 November 1975
112	Mozambique	15 November 1975
113	Cape Verde	5 December 1975
114	Lesotho	31 December 1975
115	São Tomé and Príncipe	31 December 1975
116	Nepal	7 February 1976
117	Bahrain	23 February 1976
118	Suriname	3 March 1976
119	Liberia	8 June 1976
120	Grenada	19 July 1976
121	Cameroon	1976
122	Eswatini	23 June 1978
123	Bahamas	8 September 1978
124	Gambia	11 May 1979
125	Saint Lucia	21 December 1979
126	Burundi	4 March 1980
127	Republic of the Congo	4 March 1980
128	Saint Vincent and the Grenadines	15 April 1980
129	Zimbabwe	18 April 1980
130	Rwanda	20 January 1981
131	Antigua and Barbuda	2 February 1982
132	Myanmar	1 September 1982
133	Belize	1 March 1983
134	Brunei	8 June 1984
135	Saint Kitts and Nevis	12 March 1985
136	Yemen	7 May 1985
137	Botswana	26 September 1985
138	Dominica	9 April 1986
139	Seychelles	10 November 1986
140	Vanuatu	22 December 1986
141	Somalia	2 February 1987
142	Mongolia	18 June 1987
143	Maldives	27 September 1988
144	Papua New Guinea	27 April 1989
145	Vietnam	8 May 1989
146	Namibia	21 March 1990
147	Malawi	23 August 1990
148	Lithuania	5 November 1991
149	Latvia	7 November 1991
150	Estonia	16 December 1991
151	Belarus	10 February 1992
152	Ukraine	11 February 1992
153	Armenia	17 February 1992
154	Slovenia	21 December 1992
155	Croatia	23 December 1992
156	Slovakia	1 January 1993
157	Georgia	28 April 1993
158	Uzbekistan	30 April 1993
159	Kyrgyzstan	6 August 1993
160	Moldova	11 August 1993
161	Kazakhstan	22 September 1993
162	Azerbaijan	21 October 1993
163	Liechtenstein	11 January 1994
164	Laos	13 June 1995
165	Bosnia and Herzegovina	6 December 1995
166	Tajikistan	29 March 1996
167	Turkmenistan	3 April 1996
168	Andorra	9 July 1996
169	Madagascar	7 October 1996
170	Chad	8 October 1996
171	Djibouti	22 October 1996
172	Eritrea	7 November 1996
173	North Macedonia	14 October 1998
174	North Korea	9 March 2001
175	Timor-Leste	20 May 2002
176	San Marino	20 November 2003
177	Palau	31 January 2005
178	Samoa	1 February 2005
179	Comoros	25 March 2005
180	Solomon Islands	2 August 2005
181	Nauru	2 November 2005
182	Fiji	16 February 2006
183	Tuvalu	12 May 2006
184	Montenegro	20 October 2006
185	Bhutan	21 September 2009
186	Monaco	14 April 2010
187	Central African Republic	27 April 2010
188	Marshall Islands	27 July 2010
189	Kiribati	21 September 2010
190	Federated States of Micronesia	25 October 2010
—	State of Palestine	1 December 2010
191	South Sudan	9 July 2011
192	Tonga	21 December 2011
—	Cook Islands	21 August 2015
—	Niue	2 September 2016

== Bilateral relations ==
=== Africa ===
Country	Formal relations began	Notes
Algeria	28 November 1962	See Algeria–Brazil relations Both countries established diplomatic relations on 28 November 1962: Algeria has an embassy in Brasilia.; Brazil has an embassy in Algiers.
Angola	12 November 1975	See Angola–Brazil relations Both countries established diplomatic relations on 12 November 1975: Angola has an embassy in Brasilia and consulates-general in Rio de Janeiro and São Paulo.; Brazil has an embassy in Luanda.
Cape Verde	1975	See Brazil–Cape Verde relations: Brazil has an embassy in Praia.; Cape Verde has an embassy in Brasilia.
Chad	8 October 1996	Both countries established diplomatic relations on 8 October 1996. In 2012, Chadian President Idriss Déby Itno paid a visit to Brazil.: Brazil is accredited to Chad from its embassy in Yaoundé, Cameroon.; Chad is accredited to Brazil from its embassy in Washington, D.C., United States.
Democratic Republic of the Congo	21 June 1968	See Brazil–Democratic Republic of the Congo relations Both countries established diplomatic relations on 21 June 1968.: Brazil has an embassy in Kinshasa.; DR Congo has an embassy in Brasília.
Egypt	27 February 1924	See Brazil–Egypt relations Both countries established diplomatic relations on 27 February 1924.: Brazil has an embassy in Cairo.; Egypt has an embassy in Brasília, a consulate-general in Rio de Janeiro, and a commercial office in São Paulo.
Ethiopia	9 January 1951	See Brazil–Ethiopia relations Both countries established diplomatic relations on 9 January 1951 when was accredited first Minister of Ethiopia to Brazil Mr. Blatta Dawit Ogbazgy: Brazil has an embassy in Addis Ababa.; Ethiopia has an embassy in Brasília.
Guinea-Bissau	22 November 1974	See Brazil–Guinea-Bissau relations Both countries established diplomatic relations on 22 November 1974.: Brazil has an embassy in Bissau.; Guinea-Bissau has an embassy in Brasília..
Kenya	4 July 1967	See Brazil–Kenya relations Both countries established diplomatic relations on 4 July 1967.: Brazil has an embassy in Nairobi.; Kenya has an embassy in Brasília.
Libya	9 April 1967	See Brazil–Libya relations Both countries established diplomatic relations on 9 April 1967.: Libya has an embassy in Brasília.; Brazil is accredited to Libya from its embassy in Tunis, Tunisia.
Madagascar	7 October 1996	Both countries established diplomatic relations on 7 October 1996.: Brazil is accredited to Madagascar from its embassy in Maputo, Mozambique.; Madagascar is accredited to Brazil from its embassy in Washington, D.C., United States.
Mozambique	15 November 1975	See Brazil–Mozambique relations Both countries established diplomatic relations on 15 November 1975.: Brazil has an embassy in Maputo.; Mozambique has an embassy in Brasília.; Mozambique is the country that receives the highest amount of Brazilian aid in Africa. Almost 50% of Brazilian aid allocated to the African continent between 1998 and 2010 was allocated to Mozambique.
Nigeria	16 August 1961	See Brazil–Nigeria relations Both countries established diplomatic relations on 16 August 1961 Bilateral relations between Nigeria and Brazil focus primarily upon trade and culture. The largest country in Latin America by size, and the largest country in Africa by population are remotely bordered across from one another by the Atlantic Ocean. Brazil and Nigeria for centuries, have enjoyed a warmly, friendly, and strong relationship on the basis of culture (many Afro-Brazilians trace their ancestry to Nigeria) and commercial trade.: Brazil has an embassy in Abuja and a consulate-general in Lagos.; Nigeria has an embassy in Brasília.
São Tomé and Príncipe	1975	See Brazil–São Tomé and Príncipe relations: Brazil has an embassy in São Tomé.; São Tomé and Príncipe is accredited to Brazil from its Permanent Mission to the United Nations in New York City, United States.
South Africa	31 January 1948	See Brazil–South Africa relations Both countries established diplomatic relations on 31 January 1948 Brazil-South Africa relations have traditionally been close. Brazil has provided military assistance to South Africa in the form of warfare training and logistics. Bilateral relations between the countries have recently increased, as a result of Brazil's new South-South foreign policy aimed to strengthen integration between the major powers of the developing world. South Africa is part of the IBSA Dialogue Forum, alongside Brazil and India.: Brazil has an embassy in Pretoria and a consulate-general in Cape Town.; South Africa has an embassy in Brasília and a consulate-general in São Paulo.

=== Americas ===
Country	Formal relations began	Notes
Argentina	5 August 1823	See Argentina–Brazil relations Argentina is the first country to recognize Brazil's independence and to establish diplomatic relations with the empire. The Argentine envoy Valentín Gómez presents the Brazilian Foreign Minister with a credential letter signed by Bernardino Rivadavia, with the recognition of Brazil's independence (August 5), and is received by Dom Pedro I (August 11). After democratization, a strong integration and partnership began between the two countries. In 1985 they signed the basis for the MERCOSUL, a Regional Trade Agreement. In the field of science, the two regional giants had been rivals since the 1950s when both governments launched parallel nuclear and space programs, however, several agreements were signed since then such as the creation of the Brazilian–Argentine Agency for Accounting and Control of Nuclear Materials (ABACC) to verify both countries' pledges to use nuclear energy only for peaceful purposes. National spaces agencies CONAE and the AEB had also begun working together since the 1990s. Brazil's decision to prevent a Royal Navy ship docking in Rio de Janeiro was seen as backing Argentina over the Falklands dispute. Also on the military side there has been greater rapprochement. In accordance with the friendship policy, both armies dissolved or moved major units previously located at their common border (for example, Argentine's 7th Jungle and 3rd Motorized Infantry Brigades). Brazilian soldiers are embedded in the Argentine peacekeeping contingent at UNFICYP in Cyprus and they are working together at MINUSTAH in Haiti and, as another example of collaboration, Argentine Navy aircraft routinely operate from the Brazilian Navy carrier NAe São Paulo.: Argentina has an embassy in Brasília and maintains several consulates throughout the country.; Brazil has an embassy in Buenos Aires and maintains several consulates throughout the country.; In May 2023, Argentina and Brazil announced plans to continue working on the development of a mechanism allowing them to avoid using the US dollar in bilateral trade.
Bolivia	27 March 1867	See Bolivia–Brazil relations: Bolivia has an embassy in Brasilia and maintains several consulates throughout the country.; Brazil has an embassy in La Paz and maintains several consulates throughout the country.; In 2024, Brazil recorded a trade deficit of $177 million with Bolivia. Exports to Bolivia reached $1.36 billion against $1.53 billion in imports.
Canada		See Brazil–Canada relations Brazil-Canada relations have been cordial but relatively limited, although the relationship between the two countries has been gradually evolving over time.: Brazil has an embassy in Ottawa and consulates-general in Montreal, Toronto and Vancouver.; Canada has an embassy in Brasília, and consulates-general in Rio de Janeiro and São Paulo.
Chile	22 April 1836	See Brazil–Chile relations Both countries established diplomatic relations on 22 April 1836. Chile and Brazil have acted numerous times as mediators in international conflicts, such as in the 1914 diplomatic impasse between the United States and Mexico, avoiding a possible state of war between those two countries. More recently, since the 2004 Haiti rebellion, Chile and Brazil have actively participated in the United Nations Stabilization Mission in Haiti, which is led by the Brazilian Army. They are also two of the three most important economies in South America along with Argentina.: Brazil has an embassy in Santiago.; Chile has an embassy in Brasília and consulates-general in Porto Alegre, Rio de Janeiro, and São Paulo.
Colombia		See Brazil–Colombia relations: Brazil has an embassy in Bogotá and a vice-consulate in Leticia.; Colombia has an embassy in Brasilia and maintains several consulates throughout the country.; In 2024, Brazil recorded a $1.24 billion trade surplus with Colombia. During this period, Brazilian exports to Colombia reached $3.29 billion, while imports from Colombia totaled $2.05 billion
Costa Rica	21 June 1907	See Brazil–Costa Rica relations: Brazil has an embassy in San José.; Costa Rica has an embassy in Brasilia.; In 2024, bilateral trade between Brazil and Costa Rica resulted in a $558.8 million trade surplus for Brazil, with Brazilian exports totaling $652 million and imports from Costa Rica reaching $93.2 million
Cuba		See Brazil–Cuba relations Brazilian-Cuban relations were classified as "excellent" in May 2008 following a meeting of foreign ministers. During a January 2008 state visit to Cuba by Brazilian President Lula da Silva, the Brazilian leader expressed desire for his country to be Cuba's "number one partner". Bilateral trade increased by 58% between April 2007 and April 2008. Brazilian-Cuban relations deteriorated greatly during the presidency of Brazilian right-wing president Jair Bolsonaro since 2019. The Mais Médicos (More Doctors) programme was suspended and thousands of Cuban doctors left Brazil. In November 2019, Brazil voted for the first time against an annual United Nations resolution condemning and calling for an end to Washington's economic embargo on Cuba.: Brazil has an embassy in Havana.; Cuba has an embassy in Brasília and a consulate-general in São Paulo.
Dominica	9 February 1981	Both countries established diplomatic relations on 9 February 1981: Brazil is accredited to Dominica from its embassy in Bridgetown, Barbados.; Dominica is accredited to Brazil from its embassy in Washington, D.C., United States.; Brazil and Dominica expanded bilateral ties in September 2013 through a $100,000 technical cooperation agreement focused on water resource management, agriculture, and sanitation.
Guyana	18 November 1968	See Brazil–Guyana relations Both countries established diplomatic relations on 18 November 1968. Brazil–Guyana relations have traditionally been close. Brazil has provided military assistance to Guyana in the form of warfare training and logistics. Bilateral relations between the countries have recently increased, as a result of Brazil's new South-South foreign policy aimed to strengthen South American integration.: Brazil has an embassy in Georgetown.; Guyana has an embassy in Brasília and a consulate-general in Boa Vista.
Haiti	1928	See Brazil–Haiti relations: Brazil has an embassy in Port-au-Prince.; Haiti has an embassy in Brasília, and consulates-general in Florianópolis, Salvador and in São Paulo.
Jamaica	14 October 1962	See Brazil–Jamaica relations Both countries established diplomatic relations on 14 October 1962. Both countries are full members of the Group of 15.: Brazil has an embassy in Kingston.; Jamaica has an embassy in Brasília.
Mexico	7 August 1824	See Brazil–Mexico relations Brazil and Mexico have the two largest emerging economies in Latin-America and the global stage. Both nations are considered to be regional powers and highly influential within the American continent. Both nations have historically been friendly and they have both participated in and are members of several multilateral organizations such as the G20, Organization of American States, Organization of Ibero-American States, Rio Group and the United Nations. Several high-level diplomatic meeting have been held by presidents of both nations to enhance bilateral relations.: Brazil has an embassy in Mexico City.; Mexico has an embassy in Brasilia and consulates-general in Rio de Janeiro and São Paulo.
Paraguay		See Brazil–Paraguay relations Paraguay–Brazil relations have improved greatly after Brazilian President Lula's decision in 2009 to triple its payments to Paraguay for energy from a massive hydro-electric dam on their border, ending a long-running dispute. Under the accord, Brazil will pay Paraguay $360m a year for energy from the jointly-operated Itaipu plant. Brazilian President Luiz Inácio Lula da Silva called it a "historic agreement" and the deal slated as a political victory for Paraguayan President Fernando Lugo. In February 2019, Brazilian President Jair Bolsonaro praised the late military strongman of Paraguay, Alfredo Stroessner, calling him "a man of vision." Bolsonaro made the comments during a ceremony at the Itaipu hydroelectric dam on the countries' shared border. At his side was his close ally, Paraguayan right-wing President Mario Abdo Benitez.: Brazil has an embassy in Asunción and maintains several consulates throughout the country.; Paraguay has an embassy in Brasília and maintains several consulates throughout the country.
Peru		See Brazil–Peru relations: Brazil has an embassy in Lima and a consulate in Iquitos.; Peru has an embassy in Brasilía and maintains several consulates throughout the country.
Suriname	25 November 1975	See Brazil–Suriname relations Both countries established diplomatic relations on 25 November 1975: Brazil has an embassy in Paramaribo.; Suriname has an embassy in Brasilia, and a consulate-general in Belém.
Trinidad and Tobago	27 July 1965	See Brazil-Trinidad and Tobago relations Both countries established diplomatic relations on 27 July 1965: Brazil has an embassy in Port of Spain.; Trinidad and Tobago has an embassy in Brasilia.
United States	26 May 1824	See Brazil–United States relations Both countries established diplomatic relations on 26 May 1824 Brazil-United States relations has a long history, characterized by some moments of remarkable convergence of interests but also by sporadic and critical divergences on sensitive international issues. The United States has increasingly regarded Brazil as a significant power, especially in its role as a stabilizing force and skillful interlocutor in Latin America. As a significant political and economic power, Brazil has traditionally preferred to cooperate with the United States on specific issues rather than seeking to develop an all-encompassing, privileged relationship with the United States. In October 2020, Brazilian president Jair Bolsonaro said that the Brazil-US relations have elevated to "its best moment ever.": Brazil has an embassy in Washington, D.C., and maintains several consulates throughout the country.; United States has an embassy in Brasília and maintains several consulates throughout the country.
Uruguay	29 September 1828	See Brazil–Uruguay relations Brazil and Uruguay are neighboring countries that share close historical, cultural and geographical ties. The singularity of the bilateral relationship between the two countries originates from the strong historical connection - marked by important events, such as the establishment of the Colônia do Sacramento in 1680, the annexation by Brazil and the subsequent creation of the Província Cisplatina in 1815, and Uruguay's independence from Brazil in 1828.: Brazil has an embassy in Montevideo and maintains several consulates throughout the country.; Uruguay has an embassy in Brasília and maintains several consulates throughout the country.
Venezuela		See Brazil–Venezuela relations During the Brazilian government of President Jair Bolsonaro since 2019, Brazil has cut off the relations with the current Venezuelan leftwing and disputed government of president Nicolás Maduro. Brazil downgraded its diplomatic relations with the ruling Venezuelan government. Brazil has recognised Venezuelan opposition leader Juan Guaidó as the legitimate President of Venezuela.: Brazil has an embassy in Caracas and maintains several consulates throughout the country.; Venezuela has an embassy in Brasilia and maintains several consulates throughout the country.

=== Asia ===
Country	Formal relations began	Notes
Armenia	17 February 1992	See Armenia–Brazil relations Both countries established diplomatic relations on 17 February 1992: Armenia has an embassy in Brasília.; Brazil has an embassy in Yerevan.; Brazil has recognized the Armenian genocide in 2015.
Azerbaijan	21 October 1993	See Azerbaijan–Brazil relations Both countries established diplomatic relations on 21 October 1993: Azerbaijan has an embassy in Brasília.; Brazil has an embassy in Baku.
Bangladesh	8 July 1974	See Bangladesh-Brazil relations Both countries established diplomatic relations on 8 July 1974 Relations have been good. In 2013, Bangladesh has sought Brazil's support for its candidature at the Human Rights Council in 2015 and non-permanent seat of the UN Security Council for 2016–17 term. In 2014, Brazil assured its support to Bangladesh for the posts of United Nations Human Rights Commission and CEDAW (The Convention on the Elimination of All Forms of Discrimination against Women). Bangladesh also supported Brazil's candidature for the post of Director General of World Trade Organization.: Bangladesh has an embassy in Brasília.; Brazil has an embassy in Dhaka.
China	15 August 1974	See Brazil–China relations Both countries established diplomatic relations on 15 August 1974: Brazil has an embassy in Beijing and consulates-general in Chengdu, Guangzhou, Hong Kong and Shanghai.; China has an embassy in Brasília and consulates-general in Recife, Rio de Janeiro and São Paulo.
Georgia	28 April 1993	See Brazil–Georgia relations Both countries established diplomatic relations on 28 April 1993: Brazil has an embassy in Tbilisi.; Georgia has an embassy in Brasília.
India	6 April 1948	See Brazil–India relations Both countries established diplomatic relations on 6 April 1948 The two countries share similar perceptions on issues of interest to developing countries and have cooperated in the multilateral level on issues such as reform to the UN and the UNSC expansion.: Brazil has an embassy in New Delhi and a consulate-general in Mumbai.; India has an embassy in Brasília and a consulate-general in São Paulo.
Indonesia	March 1953	See Brazil–Indonesia relations Both countries established diplomatic relations in March 1953 Both are large tropical country endowed with rich natural resources, Brazil and Indonesia possess the largest tropical rain forest of the world that contains the world's richest biodiversity, which gave them a vital role in global environment issues, such as ensuring tropical forests protection. Both countries leading the list of Megadiverse countries with Indonesia second only to Brazil.: Brazil has an embassy in Jakarta.; Indonesia has an embassy in Brasília.
Iran		See Brazil–Iran relations: Brazil has an embassy in Tehran.; Iran has an embassy in Brasília.
Iraq	1 December 1967	See Brazil–Iraq relations Both countries established diplomatic relations on 1 December 1967: Brazil maintains an embassy in Baghdad.; Iraq maintains an embassy in Brasília.; Both countries are full members of the Group of 77. Brazil was the first Latin American country to reopen its embassy in Iraq since the 1991 Gulf War.
Israel	1949-2-7	See Brazil–Israel relations Brazil played a large role in the establishment of the State of Israel. Brazil held the Presidency office of the UN General Assembly in 1947, which proclaimed the Partition Plan for Palestine. The Brazilian delegation to the U.N., supported and heavily lobbied for the partition of Palestine toward the creation of the State of Israel. Brazil was also one of the first countries to recognize the State of Israel, on 7 February 1949, less than one year after Israeli Declaration of Independence. For a long time, Brazil and Israel maintained close political, economic and military ties. Several Brazilian elected officials participate in the Israel Allies Caucus, a political advocacy organization that mobilizes pro-Israel parliamentarians in governments worldwide. The two nations enjoy a degree of arms cooperation as Brazil is a key buyer of Israeli weapons and military technology. Also, Brazil is Israel's largest trading partner in Latin America. Brazil has the 9th largest Jewish community in the world, about 107,329 by 2010, according to the IBGE census. The Jewish Confederation of Brazil (CONIB) estimates to more than 120,000. Brazil-Israel relations improved significantly during the presidency of Jair Bolsonaro since 2019. Bolsonaro has expressed his love for Israel several times. He even said to have turned Brazil into Israel's new best friend. Relations cooled after Bolsonaro's administration ended and as a result of the Gaza genocide and its ramifications. On February 17, 2024, the Brazilian President Luiz Inácio Lula da Silva denounced the military operations of Israel while speaking to reporters at the African Union summit in Addis Ababa, comparing the events in Gaza to that of the Holocaust. The statement was highly contentious within Israel, receiving strongly-worded statements from Prime Minister Benjamin Netanyahu and other public figures. On February 19, 2024, Brazil then recalled their ambassador to Israel, and summoned the Israeli ambassador for a reprimand, following Israel deeming the president of Brazil a persona non grata.: Brazil has an embassy in Tel Aviv.; Israel has an embassy in Brasília and a consulate-general in São Paulo.
Japan	1895	See Brazil–Japan relations: Brazil has an embassy in Tokyo and consulates-general in Hamamatsu and Nagoya.; Japan has an embassy in Brasília and consulates-general in Belém, Curitiba, Manaus, Rio de Janeiro, São Paulo and consular offices in Recife and Porto Alegre.
Kazakhstan	22 September 1993	See Brazil–Kazakhstan relations Both countries established diplomatic relations on 22 September 1993: Brazil has an embassy in Astana.; Kazakhstan has an embassy in Brasília.
Kuwait	20 January 1968	Both countries established diplomatic relations on 20 January 1968: Brazil has an embassy in Kuwait City.; Kuwait has an embassy in Brasília.
Lebanon	13 November 1945	See Brazil–Lebanon relations Both countries established diplomatic relations on 13 November 1945: Brazil has an embassy in Beirut.; Lebanon has an embassy in Brasília and consulates-general in Rio de Janeiro and São Paulo.
Malaysia	11 August 1959	See Brazil–Malaysia relations Both countries established diplomatic relations on 11 August 1959: Brazil has an embassy in Kuala Lumpur.; Malaysia has an embassy in Brasília.
North Korea	9 March 2001	See Brazil–North Korea relations: Brazil has an embassy in Pyongyang.; North Korea has an embassy in Brasília.
Pakistan	January 1951	See Brazil–Pakistan relations Both countries established diplomatic relations in January 1951 Brazil-Pakistan relations are characterized as friendly and cooperative. In 2008, Brazil approved the sale of 100 MAR-1 anti-radiation missiles to Pakistan despite India's pressure on Brazil to avoid doing so.: Brazil has an embassy in Islamabad.; Pakistan has an embassy in Brasília.
Palestine	1 December 2010	See Brazil–Palestine relations: Brazil has a representative office in Ramallah.; Palestine has an embassy in Brasília.; Total bilateral trade between Brazil and Palestine reached $34.24 million in 2024, yielding a $33.56 million trade surplus for Brazil.
Philippines		See Brazil–Philippines relations In June 2009, Brazil and the Philippines made their pledges as they signed mutual cooperation agreements in the fields of bio-energy and agriculture. The two countries committed themselves to take the necessary steps to implement the signed Memorandum of Understanding on Cooperation in Agriculture and the Memorandum of Understanding on Bioenergy Cooperation. The Philippines and Brazil signed six memoranda of understanding and agreements on the development and production of renewable energy, and agriculture cooperation. It intends to "facilitate technical cooperation... on the production and use of biofuels, particularly ethanol, and promote the expansion of bilateral trade and investment in biofuel,": Brazil has an embassy in Manila.; Philippines has an embassy in Brasília.
Qatar	20 May 1974	See Brazil–Qatar relations Both countries established diplomatic relations on 20 May 1974: Brazil has an embassy in Doha.; Qatar has an embassy in Brasília.
Saudi Arabia	23 December 1968	See Brazil–Saudi Arabia relations: Brazil has an embassy in Riyadh.; Saudi Arabia has an embassy in Brasília.; In 2024, Saudi Arabia recorded a trade deficit of $1.43 billion with Brazil. Exports to Brazil totaled $3.2 billion against $4.63 billion in imports.
Singapore	2 November 1967	See Brazil–Singapore relations Both countries established diplomatic relations on 2 November 1967: Brazil has an embassy in Singapore.; Singapore has an embassy in Brasília.
South Korea	31 October 1959	See Brazil–South Korea relations Both countries established diplomatic relations on 31 October 1959: South Korea has an embassy in Brasília.; Brazil has an embassy in Seoul.
Syria	13 November 1945	See Brazil–Syria relations Both countries established diplomatic relations on 13 November 1945: Brazil has an embassy in Damascus.; Syria has an embassy in Brasília and a consulate-general in São Paulo.; In 2024, Brazil recorded a $68.4 million trade surplus with Syria. Brazilian exports to Syria totaled $68.9 million, while imports from Syria were valued at $438,000.
Taiwan		See Brazil–Taiwan relations: Brazil has a Commercial Office in Taipei.; Taiwan has an Economic and Cultural Office in Brasília and in São Paulo.
Thailand	17 April 1959	See Brazil–Thailand relations Both countries established diplomatic relations on 17 April 1959: Brazil has an embassy in Bangkok.; Thailand has an embassy in Brasília.; Brazil is the main trading partner of Thailand in Latin America.
Timor-Leste		See Brazil–Timor-Leste relations: Brazil has an embassy in Dili.; Timor-Leste has an embassy in Brasilia.
Turkey	1927	See Brazil–Turkey relations: Brazil has an embassy in Ankara, a Consulate General in Istanbul.; Turkey has an embassy in Brasília and a Consulate General in São Paulo.; Both countries are members of G20 and WTO.; There are direct flights from Istanbul to São Paulo 7 times per week.; Trade volume between the two countries was US$3.1 billion in 2019 (Brazilian exports/imports: 2.6/0.48 billion USD.
United Arab Emirates	10 June 1974	Brazil has an embassy in Abu Dhabi.; United Arab Emirates has an embassy in Brasília and an consulate-general in São Paulo.; In 2024, total bilateral trade reached approximately $5.466 billion, making Brazil the UAE's primary trading partner in Latin America.; Major Brazilian exports to the UAE include raw sugar, poultry and beef, while major UAE exports to Brazil consist of refined petroleum and ethylene polymers.
Vietnam	8 May 1989	Both countries established diplomatic relations on 8 May 1989 The Brazilian Embassy in Hanoi was opened in 1994, being the first Latin American country to open an embassy in Hanoi. Vietnamese Presidents Lê Đức Anh and Trần Đức Lương have visited Brazil in October 1995 and November 2004, respectively.: Brazil has an embassy in Hanoi.; Vietnam has an embassy in Brasília.

=== Europe ===
Country	Formal relations began	Notes
Albania	4 April 1961	See Albania–Brazil relations Both countries established diplomatic relations on 4 April 1961: Albania has an embassy in Brasília.; Brazil has an embassy in Tirana.
Andorra	9 July 1996	Both countries established diplomatic relations on 9 July 1996: Andorra does not have an accreditation to Brazil.; Brazil is accredited to Andorra from its embassy in Madrid, Spain and maintains an honorary consulate in Andorra la Vella.
Austria		See Austria–Brazil relations: Austria has an embassy in Brasília and a consulate-general in São Paulo.; Brazil has an embassy in Vienna.
Bulgaria	12 June 1934	See Brazil–Bulgaria relations: Brazil has an embassy in Sofia.; Bulgaria has an embassy in Brasília.
Croatia	23 December 1992	Brazil has an embassy in Zagreb.; Croatia has an embassy in Brasília.
Czech Republic	1918	See Brazil–Czech Republic relations: Brazil has an embassy in Prague.; Czech Republic has an embassy in Brasília and a consulate-general in São Paulo.
Denmark		See Brazil–Denmark relations: Brazil has an embassy in Copenhagen.; Denmark has an embassy in Brasília and a consulate-general in São Paulo.
Estonia	16 December 1991	Both countries established diplomatic relations on 16 December 1991: Brazil has an embassy in Tallinn.; Estonia has an embassy in Brasília.
Finland	8 April 1929	See Brazil–Finland relations Both countries established diplomatic relations on 8 April 1929 Brazil recognised the independence of Finland on December 26, 1919.: Brazil has an embassy in Helsinki.; Finland has an embassy in Brasília and a consulate in São Paulo.
France	25 October 1825	See Brazil–France relations Both countries established diplomatic relations on 25 October 1825 when France recognized independent of Brazil France has recognized Brazil as its special partner in South America and as a global player in international affairs. The two countries are committed to strengthening their bilateral cooperation in the areas for which working groups have been created: nuclear power, renewable energies, defence technologies, technological innovation, joint cooperation in African countries and space technologies, medicines and the environment. Recently, France announced its support to the Brazilian bid for a permanent seat on the United Nations Security Council.: Brazil has an embassy in Paris and consulates-general in Marseille and in Cayenne and Saint-Georges (both in French Guiana).; France has an embassy in Brasília and consulates-general in Rio de Janeiro and São Paulo and a consulate in Recife.
Germany		See Brazil–Germany relations: Brazil has an embassy in Berlin and consulates-general in Frankfurt and Munich.; Germany has an embassy in Brasília and consulates-general in Porto Alegre, Recife, Rio de Janeiro and São Paulo.
Greece		See Brazil–Greece relations The countries have enjoyed "Bilateral relations [that] have always been good and are progressing smoothly," according to the Greek Ministry of Foreign Affairs.: Brazil has an embassy in Athens.; Greece has an embassy in Brasília and a consulate general in São Paulo.
Holy See		See Brazil–Holy See relations: Brazil has an embassy to the Holy See based in Rome.; Holy See has an Apostolic nunciature in Brasília.
Hungary	1927	See Brazil–Hungary relations: Brazil has an embassy in Budapest.; Hungary has an embassy in Brasília and a consulate-general in São Paulo.; The two countries signed the Brazil-Hungary Cultural Agreement in 1992.
Iceland	1952	Brazil is accredited to Iceland from its embassy in Oslo, Norway and maintains an honorary consulate in Reykjavík.; Iceland is accredited to Brazil from its Ministry of Foreign Affairs in Reykjavík and maintains honorary consulates in Rio de Janeiro and São Paulo.
Ireland	1 September 1975	See Brazil–Ireland relations Both countries established diplomatic relations on 1 September 1975: Brazil has an embassy in Dublin.; Ireland has an embassy in Brasília and a consulate-general in São Paulo.
Italy	1834	See Brazil–Italy relations: Brazil has an embassy in Rome, a consulate-general in Milan, and honorary consulates in Bari, Catanzaro, Florence, Naples, Palermo, Genoa, Trieste, Turin and Venice.; Italy has an embassy in Brasília, consulates-general in Curitiba, Porto Alegre, Rio de Janeiro, São Paulo, and consulates in Belo Horizonte and in Recife.
Latvia	7 November 1991	Both countries established diplomatic relations on 7 November 1991: Brazil is accredited to Latvia from its embassy in Stockholm, Sweden.; Latvia is accredited to Brazil from its embassy in Lisbon, Portugal.
Lithuania	5 November 1991	See Brazil–Lithuania relations Both countries established diplomatic relations on 5 November 1991: Brazil is accredited to Lithuania from its embassy in Copenhagen, Denmark and maintains an honorary consulate in Vilnius.; Lithuania has a consulate-general in São Paulo.
Luxembourg		Brazil is accredited to Luxembourg from its embassy in Brussels, Belgium.; Luxembourg has an embassy in Brasília.
Montenegro		Brazil is accredited to Montenegro from its embassy in Belgrade, Serbia.; Montenegro is accredited to Brazil from its embassy in Buenos Aires, Argentina.
Netherlands		See Brazil–Netherlands relations: Brazil has an embassy in The Hague a consulate-general in Amsterdam and an honorary consulate in Curaçao.; Netherlands has an embassy in Brasilia and two consulates-general in Rio de Janeiro and São Paulo.
Norway	11 May 1908	See Brazil–Norway relations Both countries established diplomatic relations on 11 May 1908: Brazil has an embassy in Oslo.; Norway has an embassy in Brasília and a consulate-general in Rio de Janeiro.
North Macedonia		Brazil is accredited to North Macedonia from its embassy in Sofia, Bulgaria.; North Macedonia has an embassy in Brasília.
Poland	27 May 1920	See Brazil–Poland relations Both countries established diplomatic relations on 27 May 1920: Poland has an embassy in Brasília and a consulate-general in Curitiba.; Brazil has an embassy in Warsaw.
Portugal	29 August 1825	See Brazil–Portugal relations Both countries established diplomatic relations on 29 August 1825 Portugal and Brazil have countless bilateral agreements in areas such as culture, language, R&D, immigration, defence, tourism, economy, environment, among others. Portugal and Brazil hold regular Summits to discuss bilateral and multilateral agreements and current topics (last one in Bahia in 2008, before that one in Porto in 2005). One rather controversial topic was the spelling reform that aims at homogenising spelling in lusophone countries. Both countries share a common heritage and are committed in its preservation, be it through bilateral agreements or involving other nations, such as in the framework of CPLP. Both countries lobby within the UN to upgrade Portuguese to a working language in that Organisation. Portugal has also lobbied for Brazil to become a permanent member of the UN Security Council. Finally, Portugal hosted the 1st EU-Brazil summit, in 2007.: Brazil has an embassy in Lisbon and consulates-general in Faro and Porto.; Portugal has an embassy in Brasília, consulates-general in Rio de Janeiro, Salvador, São Paulo and consulates in Belém, Belo Horizonte, Curitiba, Porto Alegre, Recife and Santos.
Romania	1928	See Brazil–Romania relations: Brazil has an embassy in Bucharest.; Romania has an embassy in Brasília and a consulate-general in Rio de Janeiro.
Russia	October 3, 1828	See Brazil–Russia relations Brazil–Russia relations have seen a significant improvement in recent years, characterized by an increasing commercial trade and cooperation in military and technology segments. Today, Brazil shares an important alliance with the Russian Federation, with partnerships in areas such as space and military technologies, and telecommunications.: Brazil has an embassy in Moscow.; Russia has an embassy in Brasília and consulates-general in Rio de Janeiro and in São Paulo.
San Marino	1 April 2002	Both countries established diplomatic relations on 1 April 2002: Brazil is accredited to San Marino from its embassy in Rome, Italy.; San Marino is accredited to Brazil from its embassy in Domagnano, San Marino.
Serbia	15 June 1938	See Brazil–Serbia relations Both countries established diplomatic relations on 15 June 1938: Brazil has an embassy in Belgrade.; Serbia has an embassy in Brasília.
Spain	1834	See Brazil–Spain relations: Brazil has an embassy in Madrid and a consulate-general in Barcelona.; Spain has an embassy in Brasília and consulates-general in Porto Alegre, Rio de Janeiro, Salvador and in São Paulo.
Sweden	1826	See Brazil–Sweden relations: Brazil has an embassy in Stockholm.; Sweden has an embassy in Brasília.
Switzerland		Brazil has an embassy in Bern and consulates-general in Geneva and Zürich.; Switzerland has an embassy in Brasília.
Ukraine	11 February 1992	See Brazil–Ukraine relations Both countries established diplomatic relations on 11 February 1992: Brazil has an embassy in Kyiv.; Ukraine has an embassy in Brasilia, a consulate-general in Rio de Janeiro and a consulate in Curitiba.
United Kingdom	18 October 1825	See Brazil–United Kingdom relations Both countries established diplomatic relations on 18 October 1825 when United Kingdom recognized independent of Brazil: Brazil maintains an embassy in London, and a Consulate-General in Edinburgh.; The United Kingdom is accredited to Brazil through its embassy in Brasília, and consulates in Belo Horizonte, Recife, Rio de Janeiro, and São Paulo.; Both countries share common membership of the Atlantic co-operation pact, the G20, the International Criminal Court, and the World Trade Organization.

=== Oceania ===
Country	Formal relations began	Notes
Australia		See Australia–Brazil relations: Australia has an embassy in Brasília and a consulate-general in São Paulo.; Brazil has an embassy in Canberra and a consulate-general in Sydney.
Fiji	16 February 2006	Both countries established diplomatic relations on 16 February 2006: Brazil is accredited to Fiji from its embassy in Canberra, Australia.; Fiji is accredited to Brazil from its embassy in Washington, D.C., United States of America and maintains honorary consulates in Rio de Janeiro and São Paulo.
New Zealand	4 March 1964	See Brazil–New Zealand relations Both countries established diplomatic relations on 4 March 1964: Brazil has an embassy in Wellington.; New Zealand has an embassy in Brasilia and a consulate-general in São Paulo.

== See also ==
- Brazil and the European Union
- Brazil–Nicaragua relations
- Brazil and the United Nations
- Brazil and weapons of mass destruction
- Brazilian Antarctica
- List of diplomatic missions in Brazil
- List of diplomatic missions of Brazil
- Mercosul
- Ministry of Foreign Relations of Brazil
- Union of South American Nations
- Visa requirements for Brazilian citizens

== Bibliography ==
- Abellán, Javier; Alonso, José Antonio (2017). The role of Brazil as a new donor of development aid in Africa. Africa, New Powers, Old Powers - University of Bologna, 4–5 May 2017.
- Almeida, Paulo Roberto de. "Never before seen in Brazil: Luis Inácio Lula da Silva's grand diplomacy." Revista Brasileira de Política Internacional 53 (2010): 160–177. online
- Buarque, Daniel. "Brazil is not (perceived as) a serious country: exposing gaps between the external images and the international ambitions of the nation." Brasiliana: Journal for Brazilian Studies 8.1-2 (2019): 285-314 online.
- Burges, Sean W. Brazil in the world: The international relations of a South American giant (2016) excerpt; wide-ranging survey.
- Burges, Sean W. Brazilian Foreign Policy after the Cold War (UP of Florida, 2009)
- Burges, Sean W., and Fabrício H. Chagas Bastos. "The importance of presidential leadership for Brazilian foreign policy." Policy Studies 38.3 (2017): 277–290. online
- Burges, Sean W. "Without Sticks or Carrots: Brazilian Leadership in South America during the Cardoso Era, 1992–2003." Bulletin of Latin American Research 25#1 (2006): 23–42.
- Burges, Sean W. Consensual Hegemony: Theorizing Brazilian Foreign Policy after the Cold War." International Relations (2008) 22 (1): 65–84.
- Brazilian foreign policy under Jair Bolsonaro: far-right populism and the rejection of the liberal international order.

Academic Journal

- Casarões, Guilherme et al. "Brazilian foreign policy under Jair Bolsonaro: far-right populism and the rejection of the liberal international order." Cambridge Review of International Affairs vol 34 (September 2021), p1-21. https://doi.org/10.1080/09557571.2021.1981248
- Chagas-Bastos, Fabrício H., and Marcela Franzoni. "The dumb giant: Brazilian foreign policy under Jair Bolsonaro." E-international Relations 16 (2019). online
- Dehshiri, Mohammad Reza, and Mohammad Hossein Neshastesazan. "Human Rights Diplomacy: Case Study of Brazil." World Sociopolitical Studies 2.1 (2018): 87–125. online
- De Sá Guimarães, Feliciano, and Irma Dutra De Oliveira E Silva. "Far-right populism and foreign policy identity: Jair Bolsonaro's ultra-conservatism and the new politics of alignment." International Affairs 97.2 (2021): 345–363. online
- Gardini, G., and M. Tavares de Almeida. Foreign Policy Responses to the Rise of Brazil: Balancing Power in Emerging States (Palgrave, 2017). How other states responded. excerpt
- Long, Tom. "The US, Brazil and Latin America: the dynamics of asymmetrical regionalism." Contemporary Politics 24.1 (2018): 113–129. online
- Lopes, Dawisson Belém. "De-westernization, democratization, disconnection: the emergence of Brazil's post-diplomatic foreign policy." Global Affairs 6.2 (2020): 167–184. online
- Magalhães, Diego Trindade D'Ávila, and Laís Forti Thomaz. "The Conspiracy-Myth Diplomacy: anti-globalism vs pragmatism in Bolsonaro's foreign policy for South American integration." OIKOS 20.3 (2022). online
- Mares, David R., and Harold A. Trinkunas, eds. Aspirational power: Brazil on the long road to global influence (Brookings Institution Press, 2016).
- Pitts, Bryan. "The Empire Strikes Back: US-Brazil Relations from Obama to Trump" in The Future of US Empire in the Americas (Routledge, 2020) pp. 165–187.
- Rossone de Paula, Francine. The Emergence of Brazil to the Global Stage: Ascending and Falling in the International Order of Competition (2018) preview; also online review
- Rossone de Paula, Francine. "Brazil's non-indifference: a case for a feminist diplomatic agenda or geopolitics as usual?." International Feminist Journal of Politics 21.1 (2019): 47–66.
- Saraiva, Miriam Gomes. "The democratic regime and the changes in Brazilian foreign policy towards South America." Brazilian Political Science Review 14 (2020). online
- Smith, Joseph. Brazil and the United States: Convergence and Divergence (U of Georgia Press; 2010), 256 pages
- Visentini, Paulo. "The Brazil of Lula: a global and affirmative diplomacy (2003-2010)" Austral: Brazilian Journal of Strategy & International Relations 1.1 (2012): 23–35. online
- Vigevani, Tullo, and Gabriel Cepaluni, eds. Brazilian Foreign Policy in Changing Times: The Quest for Autonomy from Sarney to Lula (Lexington Books, 2009).
- Weiffen, Brigitte. "Foreign Policy and International Relations: Taking Stock after Two Years of the Bolsonaro Administration." in Brazil under Bolsonaro. How endangered is democracy? (2022): 55–66. online

=== Historical ===
- Bethell, Leslie. The Abolition of the Brazilian Slave Trade: Britain, Brazil and the Slave Trade Question (2009) excerpt
- Fritsch, Winston. External Restraints on Economic Policy in Brazil, 1889-1930 (1988), emphasis on role of Great Britain.
- Garcia, Eugenio V. "Antirevolutionary diplomacy in oligarchic Brazil, 1919–30." Journal of Latin American Studies 36.4 (2004): 771–796. online
- Graham, Richard. Britain and the Onset of Modernization in Brazil 1850–1914 (1972) excerpt
- Harmer, Tanya. "Brazil's Cold War in the Southern Cone, 1970–1975' Cold War History (2012) 12#4 pp 659-681.
- Hilton, Stanley E. "The Argentine factor in twentieth-century Brazilian foreign policy strategy." Political Science Quarterly 100.1 (1985): 27–51. online
- Mota, Isadora Moura. "On the Verge of War: Black Insurgency, the 'Christie Affair', and British Antislavery in Brazil." Slavery & Abolition 43.1 (2022): 120–139. London threatened war in 1862–1863 in the "Christie Affair."
- Rivere, Peter. Absent Minded Imperialism: Britain and the Expansion of Empire in 19th-Century Brazil (1995)
- Rodrigues, Jose Honorio. "The Foundations of Brazil's Foreign Policy." International Affairs 38.3 (1962): 324–338; covers 1822 to 1889. online
- Roett, Riordan. "Brazil ascendant: international relations and geopolitics in the late 20th century." Journal of international affairs (1975): 139–154. online
- Skidmore, Thomas E. "The Historiography of Brazil, 1889-1964," Hispanic American Historical Review (1976) 56#1 pp 81–109; emphasis is on economics and foreign policy. DOI: 10.2307/2513726
- Smith, Joseph. Unequal Giants: Diplomatic Relations between the United States & Brazil, 1889-1930 1991).
- Topik, Steven C. Trade & Gunboats: The United States & Brazil in the Age of Empire (1997), covers 1870 to 1899.
