= Brazil–Malaysia relations =

- Brazil: Malaysia

Brazil–Malaysia relations are foreign relations between Brazil and Malaysia. Brazil has an embassy in Kuala Lumpur, and Malaysia has an embassy in Brasília.

== Economic relations ==
Both countries are working closely in the economic sector with many Brazilian brands and companies eyeing the Malaysian market. As of 2012, Brazilian companies had invested a total of U$6 billion in Malaysia.

The Brazilian mining company Vale has begun construction of an iron ore transfer center in Malaysia.

Brazil remains one of the biggest arms sellers as well as a major exporter of sugar and beef to Malaysia. While in Brazil, Malaysian oil company Petronas has signed a deal with OGX. Both countries are also in the process of joint ventures to develop biofuel, and Malaysia is pursuing the opportunities to assist Brazil in the planned expansion of broadband internet access throughout the country.

== Resident diplomatic missions ==
- Brazil has an embassy in Kuala Lumpur.
- Malaysia has an embassy in Brasília.

== See also ==
- Foreign relations of Brazil
- Foreign relations of Malaysia
