= Brazil–Saudi Arabia relations =

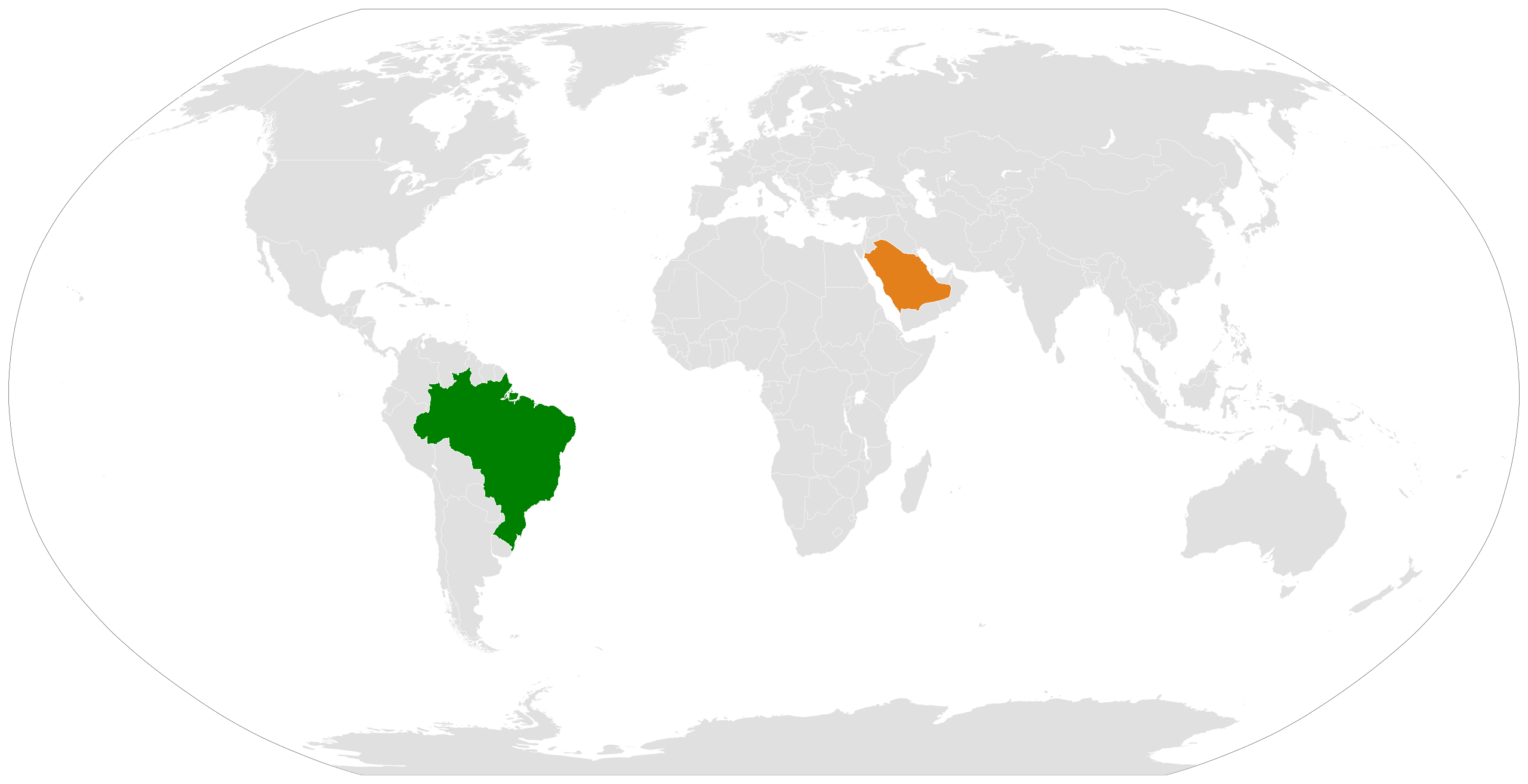
- Brazil: Saudi Arabia

Diplomatic mission
- Embassy of Brazil, Riyadh: Embassy of Saudi Arabia, Brasília

Brazil–Saudi Arabia relations are the bilateral relations between Brazil and Saudi Arabia. Brazil has an embassy in Riyadh and Saudi Arabia has an embassy in Brasília.

== History ==
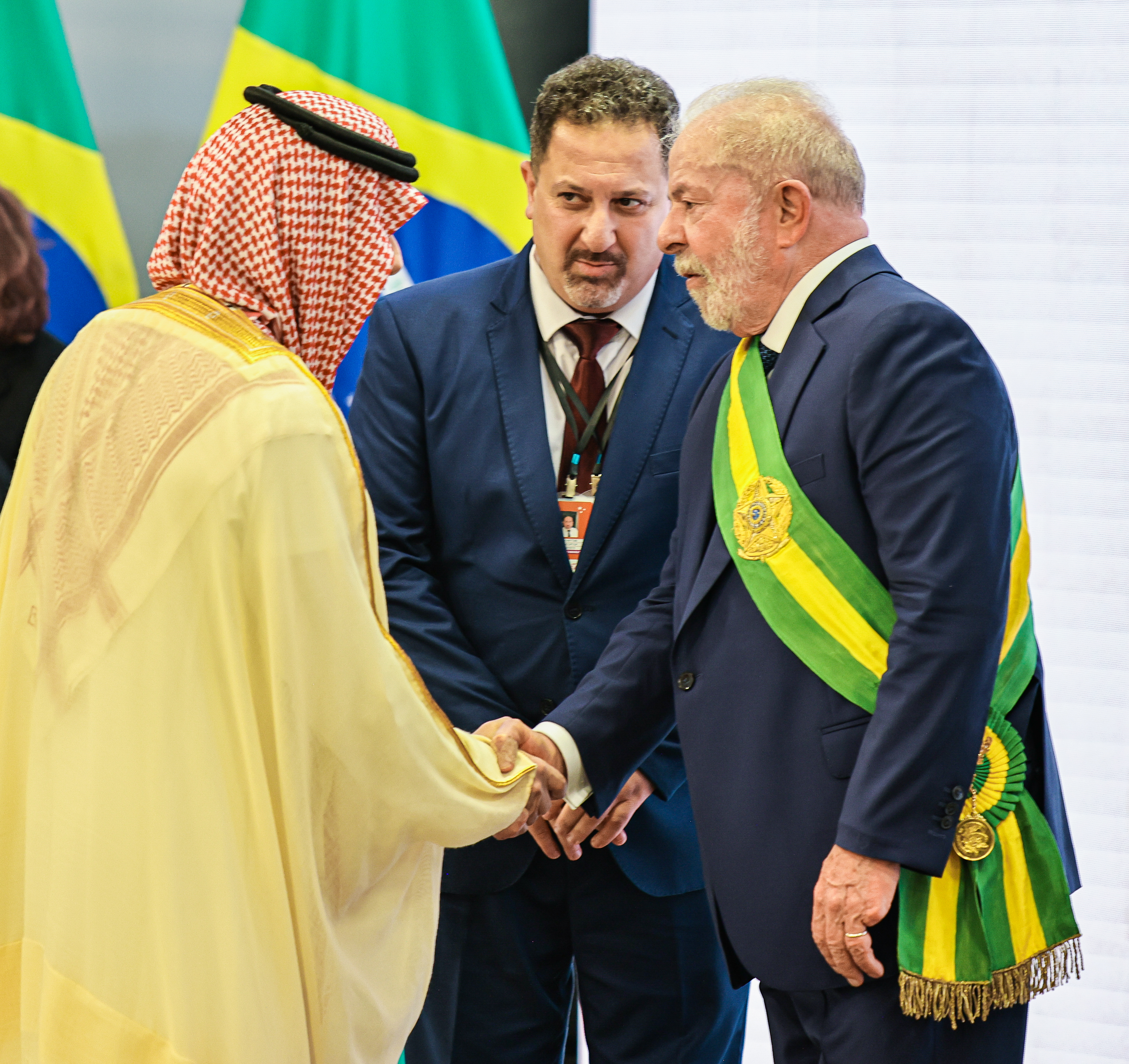
President Lula with Saudi foreign minister Prince Faisal bin Farhan Al Saud at his third inauguration, 2023

In May 2009, Luiz Inácio Lula da Silva became the first president of Brazil to visit Saudi Arabia. During the visit, Brazil and Saudi Arabia signed an agreement to expand cooperation in oil, mining, infrastructure, and science, and to increase bilateral trade. Brazil president Lula said trade between the two countries had increased 450% in the prior six years. The two countries had annual trade worth $5.5 billion.

In 2022, commerce between the two countries was $8.2 billion. Brazil primarily purchased hydrocarbons and fertilizers ($5.3 billion), while Saudi Arabia primarily purchased halal protein ($2.9 billion).

In August 2023, Lula said that he supported Saudi Arabia being accepted into BRICS.

In November 2023, Lula met in Riyadh with the prime minister and crown prince of Saudi Arabia, Mohammed bin Salman. They discussed strengthening bilateral relations, and investments in both countries. Salman said that a more robust strategic partnership between the two countries would benefit both sides. The $10 billion that the sovereign wealth fund of Saudi Arabia pledged to invest in Brazil was one topic of conversation. Lula mentioned Brazil's rapprochement with Arab countries. Salman also discussed Saudi Arabia's entry into BRICS in January 2024. Lula invited Salman to visit Brazil in 2024.

In February 2024, Saudi Ambassador to Brazil Faisal Ghulam participated in a reception held by the ambassadors of Arab countries and Islamic countries in honor of Lula, and on behalf of the ambassadors of the Arab and Islamic countries, Ghulam delivered a speech in which he reviewed the developing relations between the Arab and Islamic countries and Brazil.

On October 30–31, 2026, Brazilian Foreign Minister Mauro Vieira met with Saudi Foreign Minister Prince Faisal bin Farhan Al Saud on the sidelines of the G20 Foreign Ministers' Meeting in Atlanta, United States. During the bilateral discussions, both representatives reaffirmed commitments to joint defense projects and expressed interest in expanding bilateral trade and economic ties over the subsequent four-year period.

== Trade ==
Saudi Arabia is one of Brazil's primary commercial partners in the Middle East, while Brazil serves as a key Latin American trade venue for the Kingdom. However, the commercial dynamic remains persistently asymmetrical, with Saudi Arabia running a notable trade deficit with Brazil. In 2024, bilateral exchange reached $7.83 billion, but Saudi exports were $3.1 billion against $4.63 billion in imports from Brazil, leaving Riyadh with a $1.43 billion deficit.

This trade imbalance underscores Saudi Arabia’s ongoing reliance on foreign agricultural supply chains to fulfill basic domestic needs. Over the years, the volume of trade has expanded, yet Saudi exports remain heavily restricted to hydrocarbon-derived commodities, primarily crude oil ($1.97 billion in 2024), fertilizers ($402 million), and polymers. By contrast, Brazil maintains a diversified portfolio of exports that capitalizes on Saudi vulnerabilities in food security. The Kingdom remains deeply dependent on Brazilian raw sugar ($2.05 billion), poultry meat ($830 million), corn ($340 million), and coffee to meet domestic consumption demands.

To institutionalize and expand these bilateral economic ties, the Brazil-Saudi Arabia Business Council (affiliated with CICIBAS) was founded in 2009, which serves as the primary strategic body uniting business leaders to facilitate trade, foreign direct investment, and technical cooperation across Brazil, Saudi Arabia, and the broader Gulf Cooperation Council (GCC) region. Acting as a bridge between the private sector and government entities, the council focuses on market intelligence, commercial promotion via trade missions and B2B matchmaking and the resolution of regulatory obstacles to enhance market access for Brazilian enterprises. Through targeted initiatives in critical sectors such as agribusiness, energy, technology, and infrastructure, the organization works to address commercial asymmetries and boost mutual investment flows. The council’s governance is guided by key business leadership from both nations, including Walker Lahmann, Bruno Amado, Ricardo Santin, Hisham Al Jamaan, Bader A. Alomari and Salman bin Mohammed Al-Naeem.

Bilateral agricultural trade has occasionally faced regulatory disruptions. In January 2019, following a trade mission the previous October, Saudi Arabia revoked export permits for five Brazilian chicken processing plants citing "technical reasons" which reduced the number of active authorized facilities to 25 (representing 63 percent of Brazil's poultry shipments to the kingdom in 2018). According to the Brazilian Animal Protein Association (ABPA), Saudi Arabia was Brazil's largest market for chicken products in 2018, importing 433,500 tonnes (11.8 percent of Brazil's total poultry exports), and corrective measures were initiated to restore the suspended authorizations.

== See also ==
- Foreign relations of Brazil
- Foreign relations of Saudi Arabia
