= Bangladesh–Brazil relations =

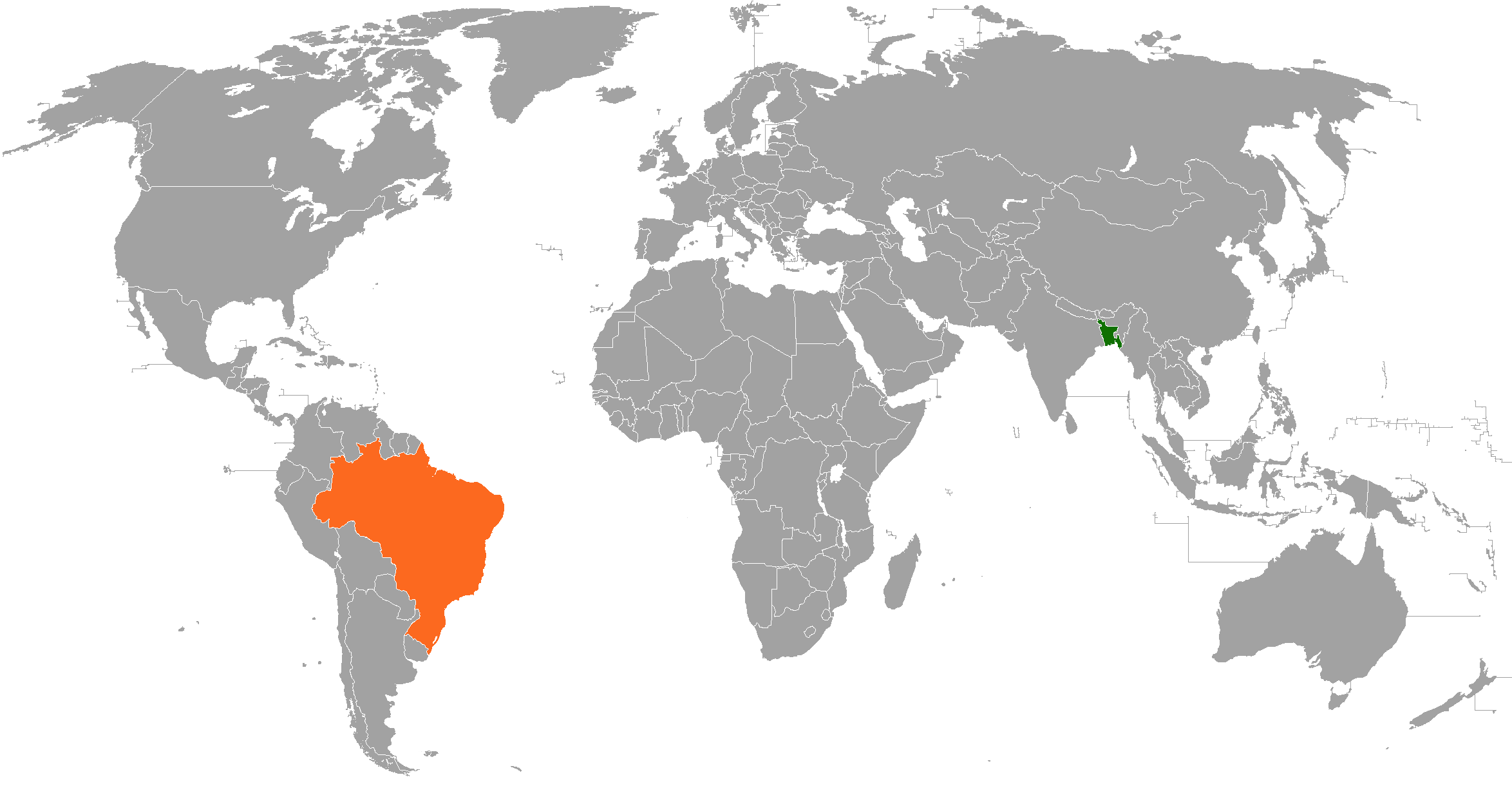

- Bangladesh: Brazil

Bangladesh–Brazil relations are the bilateral relations between Bangladesh and Brazil. Bangladesh has an embassy in Brasillia and Brazil has one in Dhaka.

== High level visits ==
Bangladesh Foreign Secretary Mohamed Mijarul Quayes paid an official visit to Brasília in 2011.

== Cooperation in international forums ==
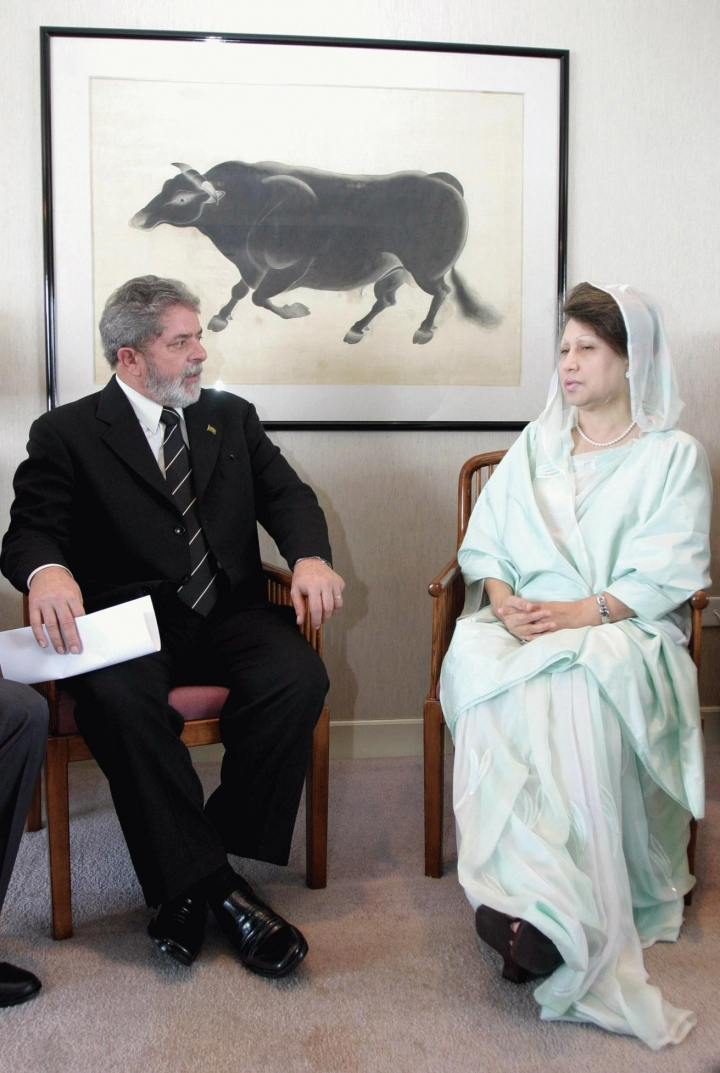
Brazilian President Lula da Silva and Bangladeshi Prime Minister Begum Khaleda Zia meet on the sidelines of the NAM summit in 2004

In 2013, Bangladesh sought Brazil's support for its candidature at the Human Rights Council in 2015 and Non-permanent seat of the UN Security Council for 2016–17 term. In 2014, Brazil assured its support to Bangladesh for the posts of United Nations Human Rights Commission and CEDAW (The Convention on the Elimination of All Forms of Discrimination against Women). Bangladesh also supported Brazil's candidature for the post of Director General of World Trade Organization. Brazil has also given Bangladesh $3 million in aid for disaster management.

== Cooperation in culture, education and agriculture ==
In 2011, Brazil proposed to sign an agreement for cooperation in various potential sectors, including agriculture, health, education and sports. In 2014, Brazil has expressed its interest in extending cooperation to Bangladesh for agricultural development.

In 2011, Brazil proposed to sign an agreement for cooperation in various potential sectors, including agriculture, health, education and sports. In 2014, Brazil has expressed its interest in extending cooperation to Bangladesh for agricultural development.

A significant dimension of the informal cultural relationship between the two nations centers around sports. Despite a massive geographical distance and Bangladesh's historically low global ranking in international football, the country hosts one of the most passionate and dense fanbases for the Brazil national football team in the world. This phenomenon manifests deeply every four years during the FIFA World Cup, transforming the local landscape into a cultural environment heavily polarized between supporters of Brazil (known locally as the Seleção) and their traditional rivals, the Argentina national football team. The roots of this fandom date back to the global broadcasting of international sports and the legacy of figures like Pelé, subsequently extending to later generations of Brazilian stars including Ronaldo, Ronaldinho, and Neymar.

During World Cup tournaments, widespread community activities emerge as fans decorate residential buildings, streets, and bridges in the green-and-yellow colors of the Brazilian flag. The extreme emotional engagement of the fanbase has occasionally drawn international public health and sociology studies due to instances of physical clashes or hazardous behavior such as falling from roofs while hoisting massive flags highlighting the deeply embedded sociology of emotion surrounding the team in a non-participating nation. The scale of this fandom has routinely captured the attention of world football's governing body, FIFA, as well as Brazilian media and institutions. During the 2022 FIFA World Cup, official social media accounts for FIFA actively broadcast videos of thousands of Bangladeshi fans celebrating Brazilian victories on the streets of Dhaka, highlighting a unique transnational cultural bond that serves as a prominent soft-power bridge augmenting formal bilateral relations.

== Economic relations ==
The bilateral trade between the two countries stood at US$1.7 billion, as of 2017. Brazil's main export to Bangladesh include agricultural products like sugar. Bangladesh has been exporting jute, ready made garments and pharmaceutical products. The trade surplus is heavily tilted in favor of Brazil.

== See also ==
- Foreign relations of Bangladesh
- Foreign relations of Brazil
