= Brazil–Iraq relations =

- Brazil: Iraq

Brazil–Iraq relations are the foreign relations between Brazil and Iraq. Brazil maintains an embassy in Baghdad and Iraq maintains an embassy in Brasília. Both countries are full members of the Group of 77.

Brazil was the first Latin American country to reopen its embassy in Iraq since the 1991 Gulf War.

== History ==
Brazil first established diplomatic relations with Iraq in 1967, and in late 1973, Brazil opened an embassy in Iraq and signed cooperation agreements with Iraq. In 1975, because of the deepening petroleum crisis and in search of petrodollar investments, Brazil favoured its foreign policy towards the Arab cause in three crucial votes in the UN. Brazil's military government upgraded its representation in Iraq by appointing a succession of four-star generals as ambassadors to Baghdad.

Brazil and Iraq had been major trading partners since the late 1970s. Brazil needed oil to run its industrial machine. Iraq needed food, technical support, appliances, automobiles and, perhaps most important, the "defensive" weapons made by Brazil. Brazil's relations with Iraq were downgraded during the Gulf War, when Brazil supported the U.N. Security Council sanctions imposed against Iraq. However, since 2001, both countries resumed relations, in which the Brazilian government wanted to promote closer commercial ties with Baghdad and announced the re-activating of its embassy in Baghdad.

In the 1980s, Brazil was an important supplier of industrialized products to Iraq, and it imported significant volumes of oil from Iraq. At that time, trade between the two countries reached up to 4 billion U.S. dollars per year. When the Iran–Iraq War broke out in 1980, nearly 35 percent of Brazil's oil imports were coming from Iraq. In 1981 it had been reported that Brazil had sold low-grade uranium ore to Iraq.

The Brazilian newspaper Jornal da Tarde reported that about 40 Brazilian scientists were in the Osirak power plant during the 1981 Israeli bombing.

=== The Iraq–Kuwait conflict ===
The Gulf War, which resulted in Operation Desert Storm in early 1991, placed Brazil in a very delicate position. United States congressional subcommittees accused Brazil of exporting technology and expertise to Iraq to develop a missile based on the Piranha missile (MAA-1). Retired Air Force Brigadier Hugo Oliveira Piva had taken a private group of Brazilian technicians to Baghdad to complete this project; under pressure, the Collor government ordered the group's return to Brazil.

During Operation Desert Storm, a Brazilian construction company, Mendes Júnior, had several hundred workers and technicians, as well as several million dollars' worth of equipment, in southern Iraq working on railroad and irrigation projects. Thus, Brazil, unlike Argentina, did not participate in the Allied operation. The Brazilian government had to dispatch its key negotiator, Ambassador Paulo de Tarso Flecha de Lima, from his post in London to negotiate the release of the Mendes Júnior personnel from Iraq and the disposition of the equipment. Brazil was awarded a US$5 billion price and performance in supplying its Osório tank to Saudi Arabia in 1990, but the Kuwait conflict changed the decision in favor of the United States Abrams tank.

=== 2003 Iraq War ===
The Iraq War in 2003, Brazil president Lula condemned the U.S.-led invasion of Iraq, saying that the United States had no right "to decide unilaterally what is good and what is bad for the world". He said that "the behaviour of the United States in relation to Iraq has weakened the United Nations".

Brazilian Ambassador to Iraq Bernardo de Azevedo Brito said although Brazil did not support the U.S.-led military invasion of Iraq in 2003, that does not mean it does not wish to participate in the reconstruction of Iraq later.

== Resident diplomatic missions ==
- Brazil has an embassy in Baghdad.
- Iraq has an embassy in Brasília.

== See also ==
- Foreign relations of Brazil
- Foreign relations of Iraq
- Brazil–Iran relations

== Notes ==
- Eugene Robinson "Sanctions Cost Brazil Key Trade Partner;Iraq Exchanged Oil for Arms in Mutually Beneficial Arrangement", The Washington Post, August 28, 1990
