= Brazil–Kenya relations =

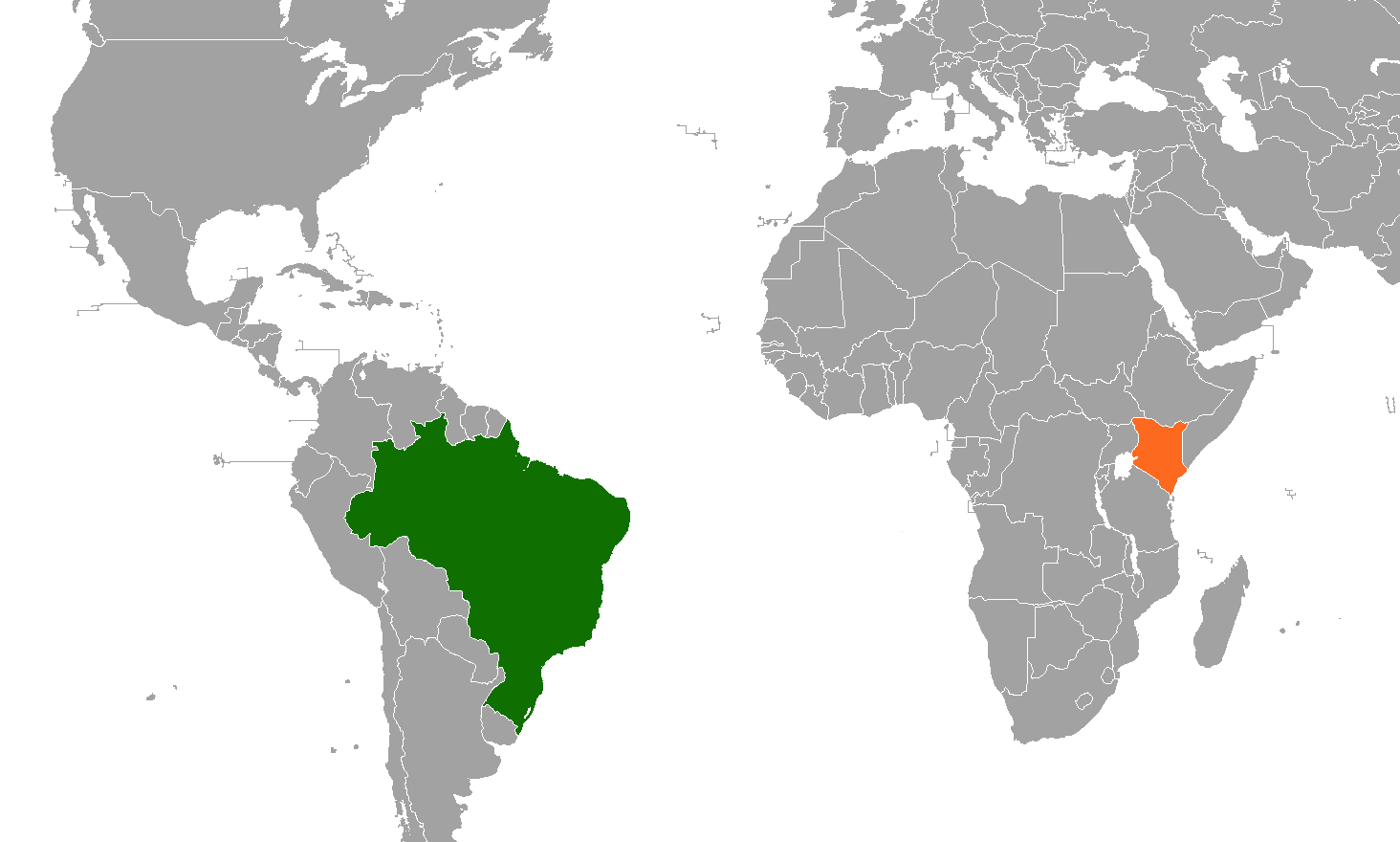
- Brazil: Kenya

Brazil–Kenya relations are bilateral relations between the Federative Republic of Brazil and the Republic of Kenya. Both nations are members of the Group of 77 and the United Nations.

== History ==
Brazil established diplomatic relations with Kenya in 1963 shortly after its independence from the United Kingdom. In 1967, Brazil opened a resident embassy in Nairobi. In 2005, the first Brazil-Kenya Joint Commission was held in Brasília. In September 2006, Kenya opened a resident embassy in Brazil. A second Brazil-Kenya Joint Commission was held in Nairobi in October 2008.

In July 2010, Brazilian President Luiz Inácio Lula da Silva paid an official visit to Kenya and met with President Mwai Kibaki. In June 2012, Kenyan President Mwai Kibaki paid a visit to Brazil to attend the United Nations Conference on Sustainable Development in Rio de Janeiro. While in Brazil, President Kibaki met with President Dilma Rousseff.

== High-level visits ==
High-level visits from Brazil to Kenya

- Foreign Minister Mário Gibson Barbosa (1972)
- Foreign Minister Celso Amorim (2005)
- President Luiz Inácio Lula da Silva (2010)

High-level visits from Kenya to Brazil

- Foreign Minister Moses Wetangula (2010)
- President Mwai Kibaki (2012)
- Foreign Minister Musalia Mudavadi (2023)
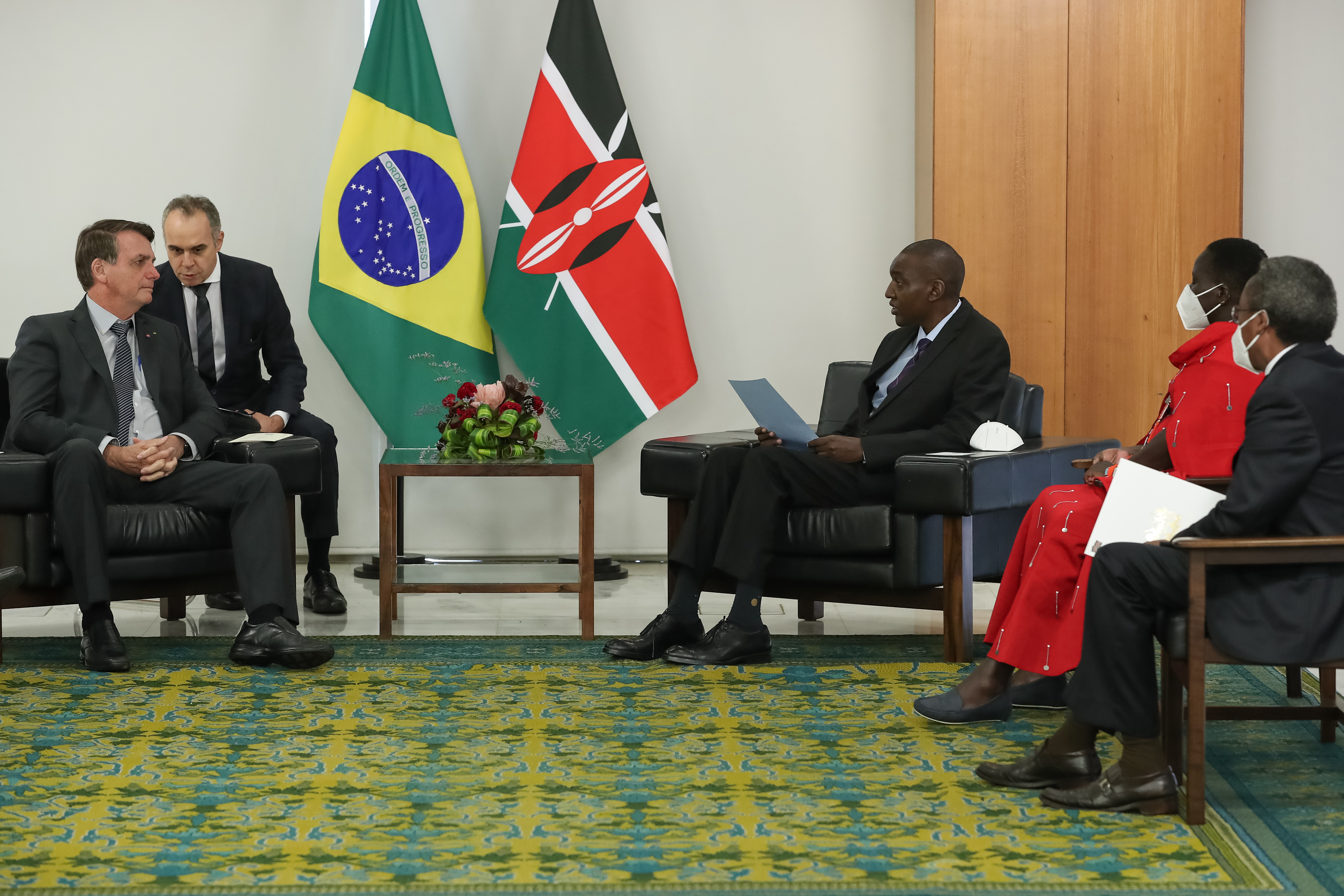
President Jair Bolsonaro with incoming Kenyan Ambassador to Brazil, Lemarron Kaanto; April 2021.

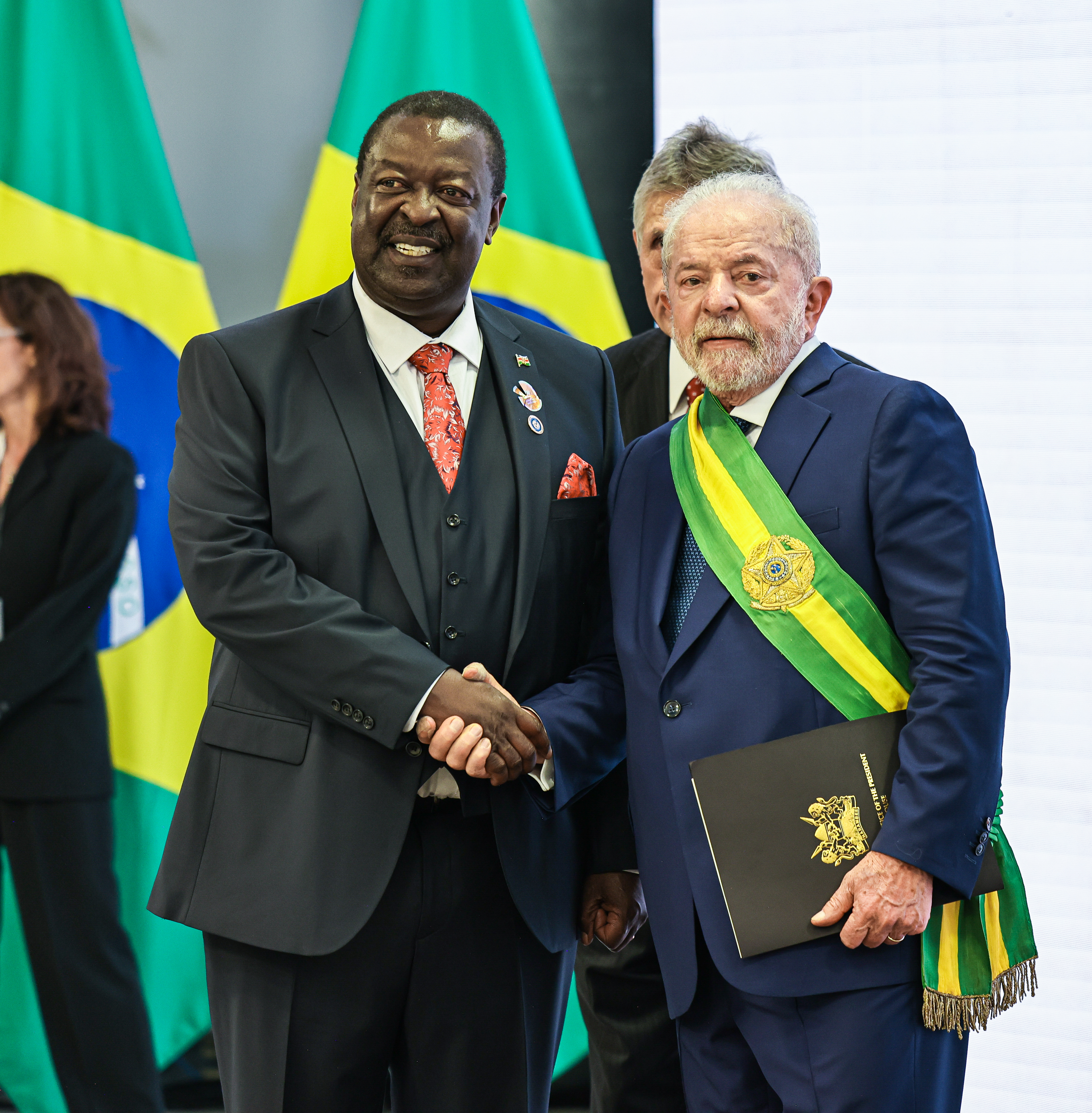
Foreign Minister Musalia Mudavadi and President Lula da Silva in Brasília; January 2023.

== Bilateral agreements ==
Both nations have signed several agreements such as an Agreement for Technical Cooperation at Sea (1972); Memorandum of Understanding on Political Consultations (2005); Agreement on Export Cooperation (2005); Agreement to establish the Brazil-Kenya Joint Commission (2005); Agreement for the Exemption of Visa in Diplomatic, Official and Service Passports (2008); Agreement for Technical Cooperation to combat HIV/AIDS and Malaria (2008); Agreements in Energy Cooperation; (2010) Agreement of Cooperation in Education (2010); Agreement for the exercise of paid activities by dependents of diplomatic personnel (2010); Agreement for the Promotion of Trade and Investments (2010); Air Service Agreement (2010); Agreement for Cultural Cooperation (2010); and a Memorandum of Understanding in cooperation between diplomatic academies of both nations (2010).

== Resident diplomatic missions ==
- Brazil has an embassy in Nairobi.
- Kenya has an embassy in Brasília.
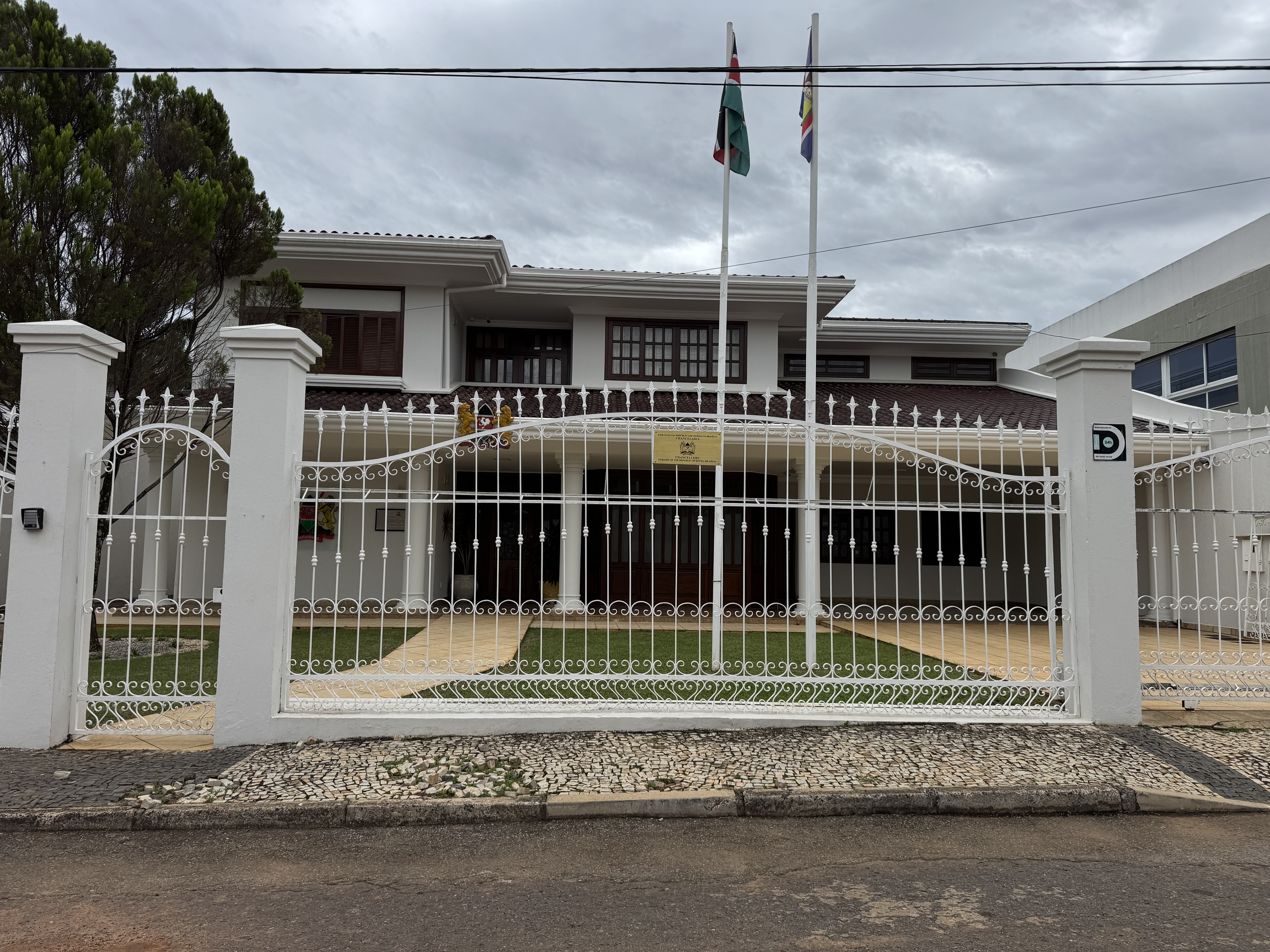
Embassy of Kenya in Brasília
