= Canadian Brazilians =

Brazilian persons of predominantly Canadian descent

Canadian Brazilians Canado-brasileiros
- Canada Brazil

Total population
- 11,631

Regions with significant populations
- Brazil: Mainly Southeastern and South Brazil
- Paraná: 6,423
- Rio Grande do Sul: 3,511
- São Paulo: 100
- Espírito Santo: 10
- Rio de Janeiro: 277
- Minas Gerais: 1,000
- Pará: 310

Languages
- Brazilian Portuguese and Canadian English

Religion
- Protestantism and Roman Catholicism

Related ethnic groups
- Other Canadian and Brazilian people, especially European Canadians, Brazilian diaspora in English-speaking countries, other White Latin Americans; West and Northern European or Protestant White Brazilians as Irish, Scottish, English, Dutch, Scandinavian, Finnish, Latvian, German (ethnic Germans also among Czech, Russian and Polish immigrants), Austrian, Swiss, French, Luxembourger and Belgian Brazilians

A Canadian Brazilian (Portuguese: Canado-brasileiros) is a Brazilian person who is fully, partially or predominantly of Canadian descent, or a Canadian-born immigrant in Brazil. Many Canadians also travel to Brazil for work. From 1925 to 1968, over 11,631 Canadians had settled in Brazil. Canada has always had a significant relationship with Brazil since the 1800s. The countries have had extensive interactions in the financing of infrastructure projects, particularly utilities. Brazil is the largest recipient of Canadian investment in South America and until 1974 was the venue for the largest single Canadian foreign investment. In 1991, Canadian investment in Brazil totalled around CANS 2 billion.

One of the more interesting aspects of Canadian–Brazilian relations is the quiet nature of the relationship, and a lack of interest in this relationship on the part of scholars in particular and Canadians in general.

As well as Canadian engineer Arthur Cameron MacDonald (1863–1940), born in Pictou, in the province of Nova Scotia. He was 65 years old and had much experience when he designed and built the railroad between Cambará and the Apucarana mountain range, in Paraná.

In Rio Grande do Sul, many Canadian immigrants and especially the country itself have had a common partnership for years. In the state of Paraná, also in the South Region of Brazil, last week, technicians from the Brazil-Canada Chamber of Commerce and members of the Consulate General of Canada were in Maringá for the first edition of the International Business Meeting (Enit), promoted by Mercosul Institute, Commercial and Business Association of Maringá (ACIM) and Terra Roxa Development Agency. The group, commanded by the Canadian consul in Brazil, Benoit Prefontaine, is looking for partners to promote investments between the two countries.

== Notable Canadian Brazilians ==
- Kevin Alves
- Mia Goth
- Laysla De Oliveira
- Tasya Teles

== See also ==
- Brazil–Canada relations
- Immigration to Brazil
- White Brazilians
- White Canadians
- Brazilian Canadians
