= Brazilians in French Guiana =

Total population
- 92,493 (2023)

Regions with significant populations
- Cayenne · Saint-Georges

Languages
- Portuguese · French, French Guiana Creole

Religion
- Roman Catholicism

Related ethnic groups
- Brazilian diaspora

Nearly half of all Brazilians in France live in the overseas region of French Guiana, including many who have crossed the 730 km border illegally. While Brazilian citizens may travel to Metropolitan France without a visa, they do need a visa to enter French Guiana.

As is the case in neighbouring Guyana and Suriname, many Brazilian migrants are gold miners.

As of 2023, there are about 93,000 Brazilians in French Guiana.

== Illegal immigration ==
French Guiana continues to be a popular destination for illegal miners from neighbouring Brazil for three reasons: the price of gold has dramatically increased created a large scale gold rush in the Guianas, the strong repression organized by Brazilian security forces against illegal mining in Brazil and the lack of traceability in the French legal gold supply chain which allows an easy laundering of illegal gold.

Over 15,000 illegal immigrants mainly from Brazil are said to work in over 500 non-permitted extraction sites in French Guiana. The commune of Saint-Georges, which lies on the Oyapock River (which forms the border with Brazil), opposite the Brazilian town of Oiapoque, is one of the main gateways for illegal Brazilian immigrants.

== See also ==
- Brazil–France relations
- Brazilians in Guyana
- Brazilians in Suriname
- Oyapock River Bridge
