= Amapá Question =

Franco-Brazilian border dispute of 1895

French intrusion into Amapá
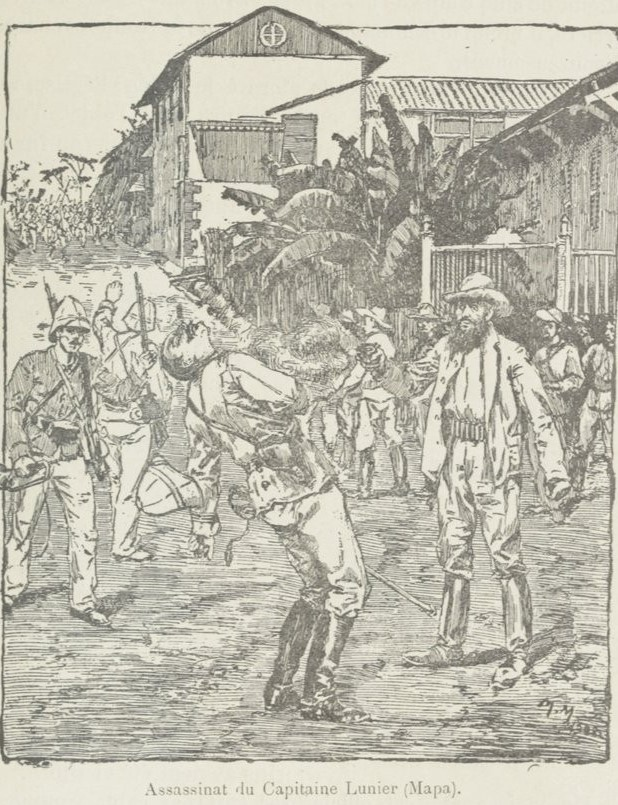
- Death of Captain Charles-Louis Lunier during the invasion of Amapá, illustration published in 1912
Date	15 May 1895
Location	Amapá, Brazil
Result	Brazilian victory

Belligerents
Brazil	(French Third Republic) France

Commanders and leaders
(Brazil) Francisco Xavier da Veiga Cabral	(French Third Republic) Charles-Louis Lunier †; (French Third Republic) Lieutenant Destoup

Strength
200 soldiers and civil militia	300 soldiers 1 gunboat

Casualties and losses
62	82

The Amapá Question, known in France as the Franco-Brazilian Dispute (French: Contesté franco-brésilien) was a 1895 border dispute involving France and Brazil. The French intrusion into Amapá resulted in skirmishes between the two sides.

== Border dispute ==
France did not recognize the Oyapock river as the border between French Guiana and the Brazilian province of Amapá, also known as "Brazilian Guyana", claiming for itself part of the territory of the province to the south of the river; a region occupied by French colonists. However, the Peace of Utrecht, signed in 1713 between France and Portugal, established the Oyapock as the border between both kingdoms in South America. Brazil alleged it had the right to exercise sovereignty over the region as "heir of the Portuguese Empire".

== Intrusion ==
The French intrusion into Amapá took place on 15 May 1895, on the border between the Brazilian Amapá state and French Guiana, the culminating event of the territorial dispute known in Portuguese as the Questão do Amapá (Amapá Question). This event marked Captain Charles-Louis Lunier leading French troops in an invasion of Brazilian territory. French troops advanced to the Araguari River, occupying approximately 260,000 km^{2} (100,000 sq mi) of Brazilian territory.

The invasion was repelled by the honorary general of the Brazilian Army Francisco Xavier da Veiga Cabral.

== International response ==
After the military confrontation, the territorial dispute was settled by an international court on 27 December 1897. The decision was favorable to Brazil, which maintained control over the disputed region.

Walter Hauser, president of Switzerland, served as arbitrator. On 1 December 1900, Hauser issued a report favoring Brazil.

== See also ==
- Brazil–France relations
- Brazil–France border
- French colonization of the Americas
