= Brazil–Suriname relations =

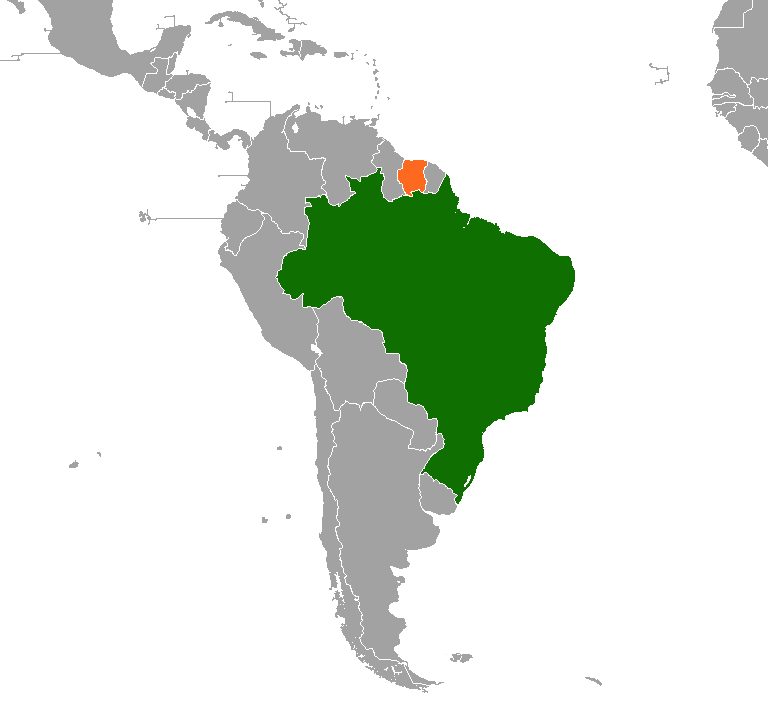
- Brazil: Suriname

Brazil–Suriname relations are the bilateral relations between the Federative Republic of Brazil and the Republic of Suriname. Diplomatic relations were established on 3 March 1976. Brazil has an embassy in Paramaribo since the independence of Suriname on 25 November 1975. Suriname has an embassy in Brasília since 1976, and a consulate in Belém since 2012.

== Border ==
Suriname and Brazil share a border in the Tumuk Humak Mountains. In 1906, the border was defined by the Treaty of Limits. There is no road connection between Brazil and Suriname. Plans to extend BR-163 into Suriname exist, however as of 2021, there is still a 466 kilometres (290 mi) gap between Pokigron, Suriname and Oriximiná, Brazil. There is an unpaved path between Missão Tiriyó and Sipaliwini Savanna which is used by the Tiriyó people who inhabit the border region.

== History ==
In general, there have been friendly relations between Brazil and Suriname. There were official state visits from Suriname to Brazil in 1996, and 2018. The relationship became strained in 2000, when a Brazilian Parliamentary Commission into the illegal drug trade wanted to question Surinamese ambassador Rupert Christopher. Christopher refused to see them, and was subsequently expelled from Brazil. The relationship was normalised in 2002, when Sonny Hira was installed as ambassador to Brazil.

In 2009, riots erupted in the Surinamese town of Albina after a Maroon inhabitant of the area was allegedly stabbed by a Brazilian immigrant. Between 1 and 7 people were killed as a result, with over many more missing. The Brazilian immigrants in the area surrounding Albina were quickly evacuated to Paramaribo, the Surinamese capital.

In January 2022, Brazilian President Jair Bolsonaro paid an official visit to Suriname. It was the first visit to Suriname by a Brazilian head of state since 2005, when then-President Luiz Inácio Lula da Silva was in Paramaribo.

== Trade ==
Trade between Suriname and Brazil is limited. In 2019, Suriname exported US$36.1 million worth of goods to Brazil with the main export product being shag tobacco. Brazil exported US$41 million worth of good with the main products being construction vehicles, and poultry.

== Migration ==
Suriname has a significant amount of Brazilians living in their country. The 2000 estimation was 40,000 people. A large portion of the Brazilians are garimpeiros (illegal gold prospectors) who have created villages like Villa Brazil, and Antonio do Brinco. The Brazilian word garimpeiro has become the generic term for artisan gold prospectors both in Suriname and French Guiana.

== Resident diplomatic missions ==
- Brazil has an embassy in Paramaribo.
- Suriname has an embassy in Brasília and a consulate-general in Belém.

== See also ==
- Foreign relations of Brazil
- Foreign relations of Suriname
- Brazilians in Suriname
- Surinamese Brazilians
