= Lycée Français François Mitterrand =

French international school in Brazil

Coordinates: 15.8555°S 47.8525°W

- Portuguese: Escola francesa François Mitterrand

Information
- Established: 1973
- Age: 3 to 18
- Language: French
- Website: https://www.lyceefrancaisbrasilia.com/

Lycée Français François Mitterrand (LfFM: Portuguese: Escola francesa François Mitterrand) is a French international school in Brasília, Brazil. It serves levels maternelle (preschool) through lycée (senior high school).

== History ==
The school was established in 1973. Originally in rented premises, the school moved into a purpose-built building in 1980.

== See also ==
- French Brazilian
