= French Brazilians =

Brazilians of French birth or descent

French Brazilians Franco-brasileiro Franco-Brésilien
- (France) (Brazil)

Total population
- c. 1 million 0.5 of Brazil's population (2013)

Regions with significant populations
- Predominantly São Paulo, Rio de Janeiro, São Luís, Fortaleza, Parnaíba, Recife .

Languages
- French, Portuguese

Religion
- Predominantly Roman Catholicism, Judaism

Related ethnic groups
- Other Brazilians · French people Other White Brazilians · Belgian Brazilians · Luxembourg Brazilians · German Brazilians · Swiss Brazilians · Austrian Brazilians · Greek Brazilians · Arab Brazilians · Italian Brazilians · Spanish Brazilians · Portuguese Brazilians; French Canadians · French Americans · French Argentines · French Mexicans · French Uruguayans

French Brazilians (French: Franco-Brésilien; Portuguese: Franco-brasileiro or galo-brasileiro) refers to Brazilian citizens of full or partial French ancestry or persons born in France who reside in Brazil. Between 1850 and 1965 around 100,000 French people immigrated to Brazil. The country received the second largest number of French immigrants to South America after Argentina (239,000). It is estimated that there are around 1 million Brazilians of French descent today.

== French immigration to Brazil ==
The French community in Brazil numbered 592 in 1888 and 5,000 in 1915. It was estimated that 14,000 French people were living in Brazil in 1912, 9% of the 149,400 French people living in Latin America, the second largest community after Argentina (100,000).

As of 2014, it is estimated that 30,000 French people are living in Brazil, most of them in São Paulo and Rio de Janeiro. They form the largest community of French expatriates in Latin America.

== French colonies ==
- Piracicaba (São Paulo - 1852)
- Guaraqueçaba (Paraná - 1852)
- Ivaí (Paraná - 1847)

== Education ==
Brazil has the following French international schools:

- Lycée Pasteur de São Paulo
- Lycée Molière de Rio de Janeiro
- Lycée Français François Mitterrand - Brasília

== Notable French Brazilians ==
- Abgar Renault
- Alberto Santos-Dumont
- Alfred Agache
- Alfredo d'Escragnolle Taunay
- Antônio Carlos Jobim
- Augusto Leverger, Baron of Melgaço
- Aurélien Hérisson
- Baptiste-Louis Garnier
- Bernard Rajzman
- Breno Bidon
- Éder Jofre
- Edgar Duvivier
- Eduardo Gomes
- Eduardo Matarazzo Suplicy
- Émile Mallet, Baron of Itapevi
- Érick Jacquin
- Félix Taunay
- Françoise Forton
- Prince Gaston, Count of Eu
- Gil de Ferran
- Gregorio Duvivier
- Guta Stresser
- Heloísa Périssé
- Henri Nicolas Vinet
- Henriette Morineau
- Henrique Dumont
- Hércules Florence
- Hermano da Silva Ramos
- Isabelle Tuchband
- Ivo Pitanguy
- Jade Picon
- Jorge Guinle
- Lily Marinho
- Louis Adolphe le Doulcet
- Lúcio Costa
- Magda Tagliaferro
- Marc Ferrez
- Marie Durocher
- Nelson Piquet
- Nelson Piquet Jr.
- Paulino Soares de Sousa, 1st Viscount of Uruguai
- Paulo Autran
- Pardal Mallet
- Pedro de Frontin
- Renée Le Brun de Vielmond
- Ricardo Boechat
- Roberto Burle Marx
- Virginie Boutaud
- Vitor Belfort

== See also ==
- Brazil–France relations
- Brazilians in France
- Brazilians in French Guiana
- Immigration to Brazil
- White Brazilians
- Huguenots in South Africa
- French Canadians
- French people
- French invasions in Brazil
