= Brazilians in Guyana =

Community in Guyana

Total population
- 15,000

Regions with significant populations
- Georgetown

Languages
- Portuguese · English (Guyanese)

Religion
- Roman Catholicism

Related ethnic groups
- Brazilian diaspora

Brazilians in Guyana consists of Brazilian nationals, mostly miners, living in Guyana as well as Guyanese people of Brazilian descent. There are currently about 15,000 Brazilians living in Guyana.

== History ==
Brazilian mining in Guyana goes back to the early nineties. The influx of Brazilians into the country was largely a result of Brazil's recent mining policies. Significant federal enactments in the early 1990s, saw mining areas curtailed, and mining activity severely restricted, in part due to the growing environmental concern for forest land. In Brazil, the issue of mining in areas like Roraima was also linked to the rights of indigenous peoples. Thus, the influx of Brazilians into the mining industry in Guyana can be seen as a recent phenomenon.

The border between Brazil and Guyana is long and porous. While some high-income Brazilian miners and workers can afford the plane journey from Boa Vista as a means of entering the country, others use the time-tested routes of land and water.

== Illegal immigration ==
Many Brazilian miners came to Guyana illegally. Guyanese police have regularly raided Brazilian hotels to apprehend illegal residents.

== See also ==
- Brazil–Guyana relations
- Brazilians in Suriname
