= Brazil–France border =

International border between Brazil and France

- The current border and the road connecting Cayenne to Macapá.

Characteristics
- Entities: Brazil; France
- Length: 730 kilometres (450 mi)

History
- Established: 1713
- Current shape: 1900
- Treaties: Peace of Utrecht

The Brazil–France border is the line, located in the Amazon rainforest, that demarcates the borders of the Brazilian state of Amapá and French Guiana.

The Oyapock River defines part of the border and is spanned by the Oyapock River Bridge, the only bridge crossing the border, which connects the towns of Saint-Georges (French Guiana) and Oiapoque (Brazil).

At 730 kilometres (450 mi) in length, it is the longest border France shares with another country, despite not being located in metropolitan France. The second longest is the one with Spain, at 623 kilometres (387 mi).

== History ==
The basis of this border dates back to the Peace Treaty of Utrecht signed between France and Portugal in 1713, which established the border between both the colonial holdings of both kingdoms in South America. Despite the treaty specifying the Japoc River as the border, disagreement between France and Brazil (as the heir of the Portuguese Empire) continued into the following centuries due to uncertainty regarding the river's location. France considered the Japoc River mentioned in the text to correspond to the Araguari River, whereas Brazil considered it to correspond to the Oiapoque River.

The dispute went on for two centuries as France and Brazil set up military posts and religious missions in what would spark the Amapá Question, an event which saw French troops invade Brazilian territory up to the Araguari river occupying approximately 260,000 km^{2} (100,000 sq mi) of Brazilian territory.

The territorial dispute was resolved in Brazil's favor in 1900 through an international arbitration in Switzerland. The international court took documents and texts collected by France and Portugal at the time and determined that those collected by the Portuguese gave more credence towards the Brazilian claim of the border being set at the Oiapoque River. Additionally, they took the history of the territory and its inhabitants into consideration. Aside from small coastal French settlements, this region of South America was entirely populated by Brazilians and indigenous peoples who saw themselves as Brazilian nationals.

As a cultural vestige of this period, small Amerindian communities still exist today in Amapá that speak Lanc-Patuá, a French-based Guyanese Creole.

== See also ==
- Amapá Question
- Brazil–France relations
