= Lycée Molière de Rio de Janeiro =

French international school in Brazil

Coordinates: 22.9307°S 43.1907°W

Lycée Molière de Rio de Janeiro (Portuguese: Liceu Molière) is a French international school in Laranjeiras, Rio de Janeiro, Brazil. The school serves maternelle (preschool) through the final year of lycée (senior high school), terminale. As of 2015 the school has over 750 students.

== See also ==
- French Brazilian
