= Brazilians in France =

Brazilian community in France

Brazilians in France Brasileiros na França
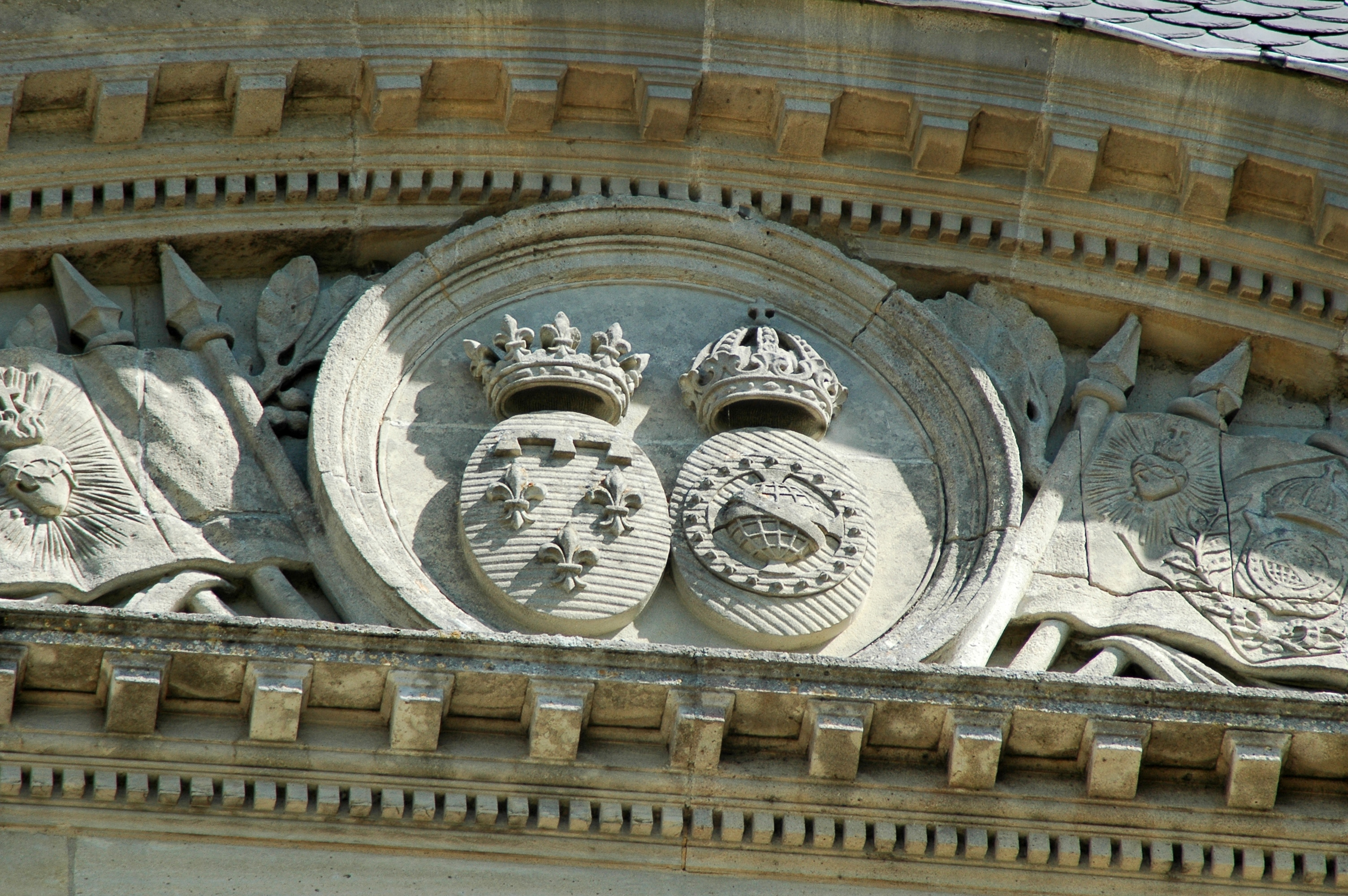
- Coats of arms of the House of Orleans-Braganza at the Château d'Eu, residence of the Brazilian imperial family during their exile.

Total population
- 181 500

Regions with significant populations
- Metropolitan France: 95,000
- French Guiana: 92,493

Languages
- Portuguese, French

Religion
- Roman Catholicism, Atheism

Related ethnic groups
- Argentines in France, Portuguese people in France

Brazilians in France number approximately 181,500 and form the largest immigrant group from Latin America in France. Nearly half of them live in French Guiana, including many who have crossed the border illegally.

== History ==
=== Background ===
The ancestral origins of the Brazilian nation show recent ancestors of generations predominantly as Italians and Portuguese, but with strong African, Spanish, Japanese, German, British, French, Native American, Slavic and Semitic components, making most Brazilians able to join the European Union.

However, they faced very different legal circumstances that Portugal and Italy had long before they joined the EU migration policy, thousands of people a day come to the consulates of Portugal to process the new nationality or obtain a visa; nevertheless, they are not the most numerous among Latin American immigrants in Europe.

== Demographics ==
The 2012 Census recorded 64,622 Brazilian-born people.

Year	Brazilian-born population	Other data
1999		7,909
2005	45,050	
2006	49,578	
2007	52,371	
2008	54,608	
2009		
2010		
2011		38,584
2012	64,622	
2013		
2015	110 550	
2020	153 700	
2022	181 500	

== Notable people ==
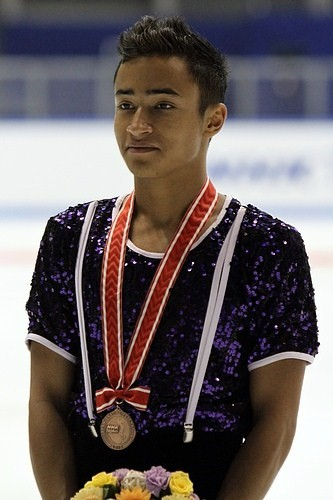
Florent Amodio

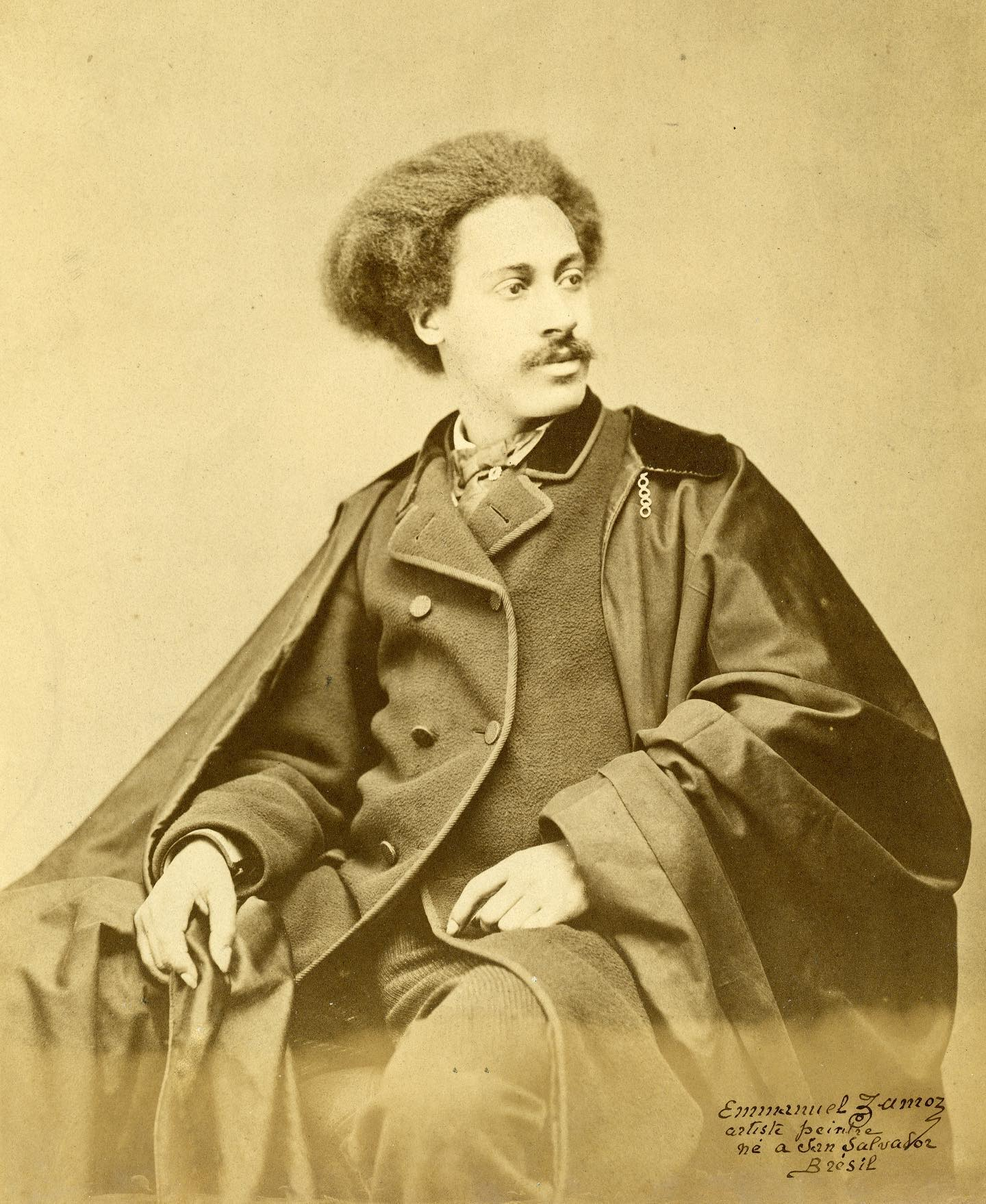
Emmanuel Zamor

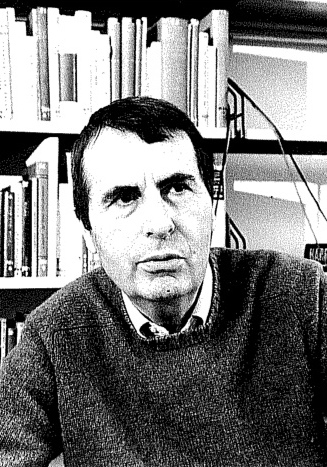
Jean-Louis de Rambures

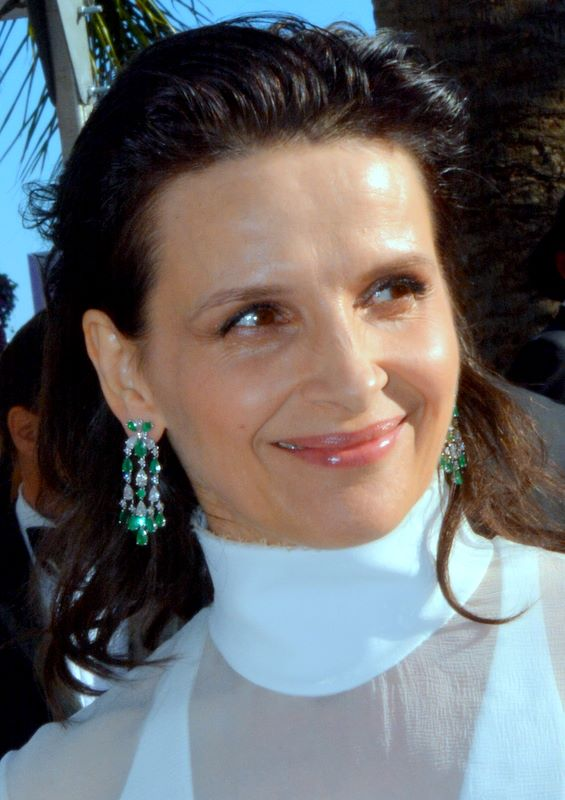
Juliette Binoche

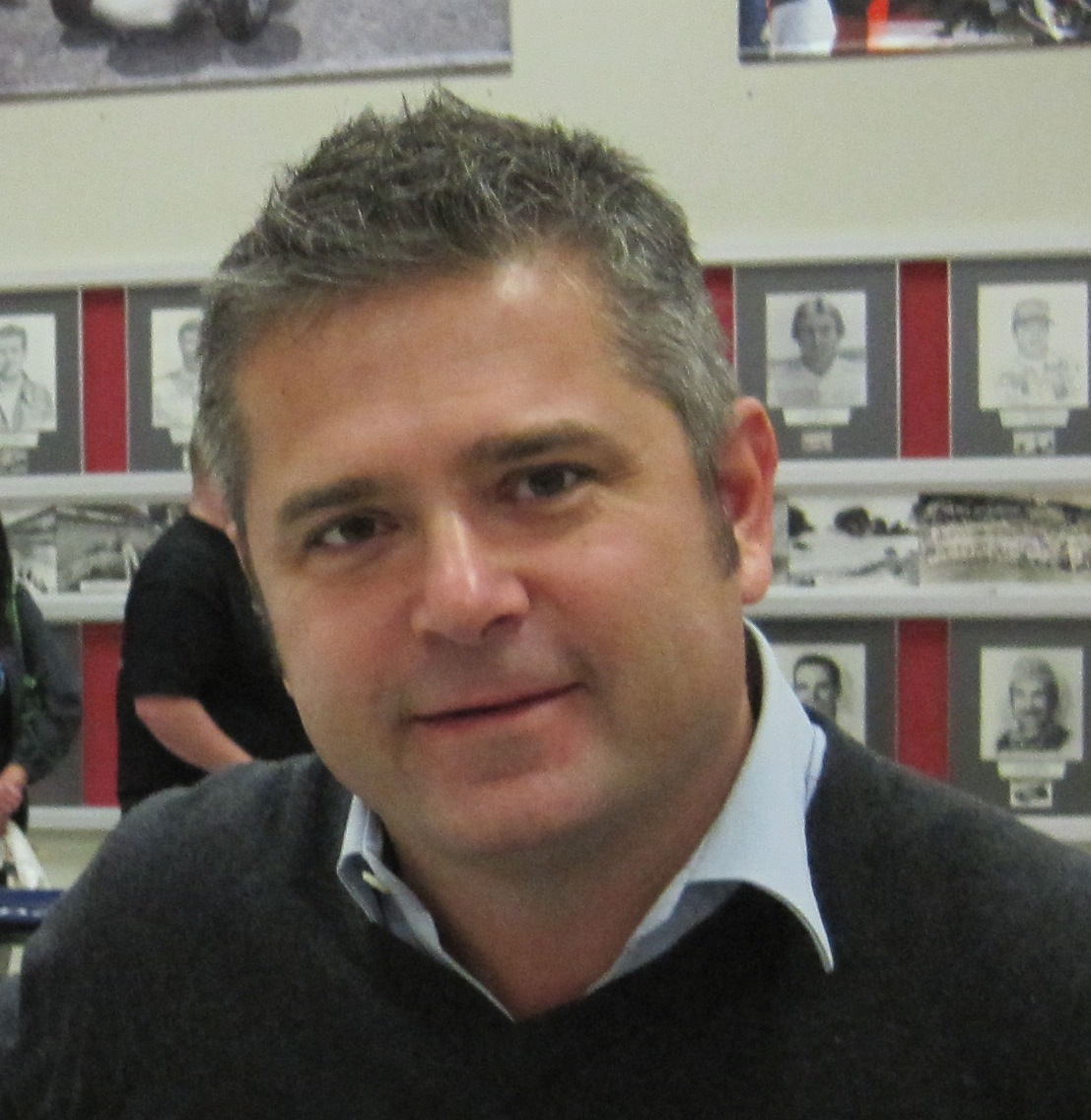
Gil de Ferran

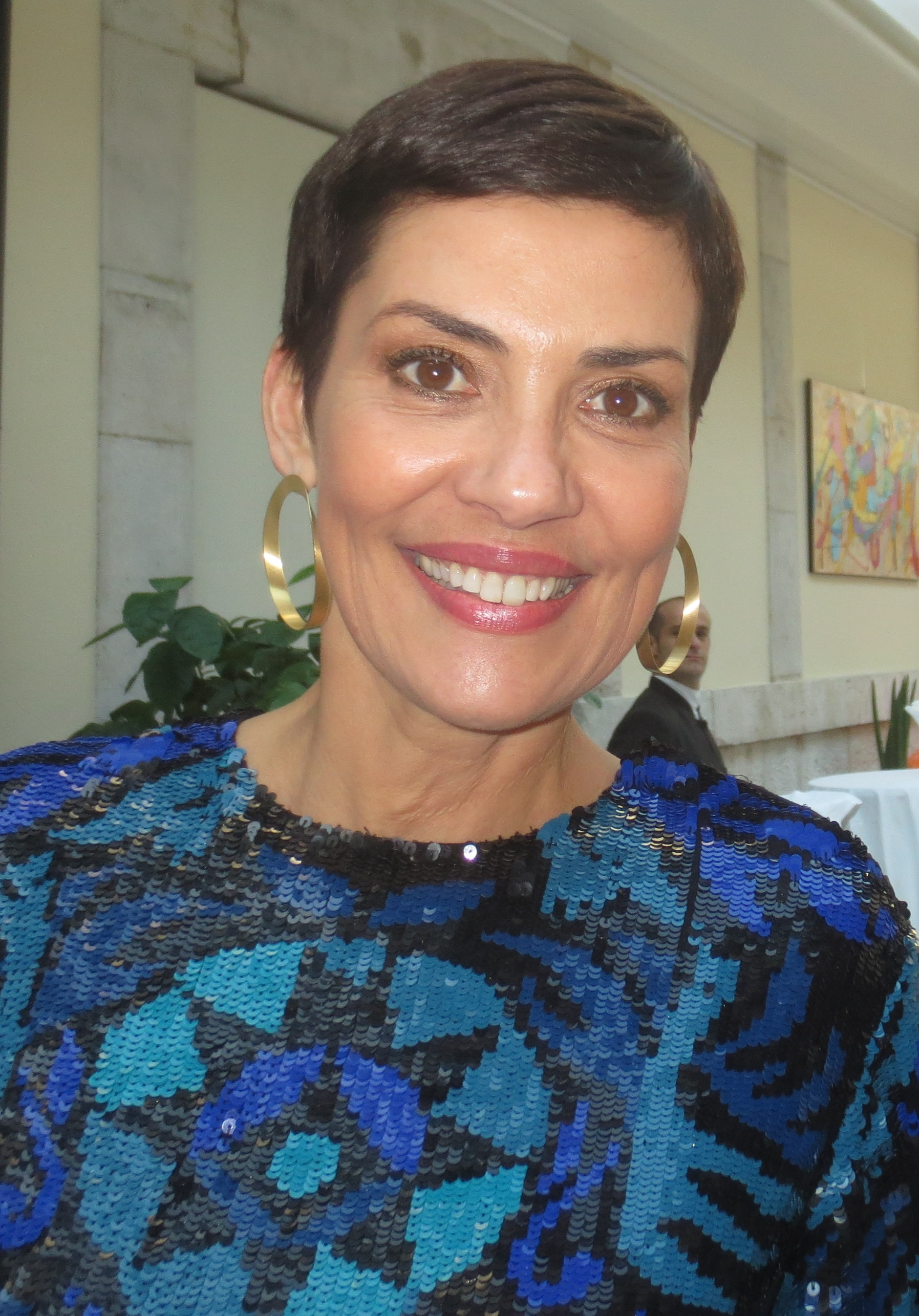
Cristina Córdula

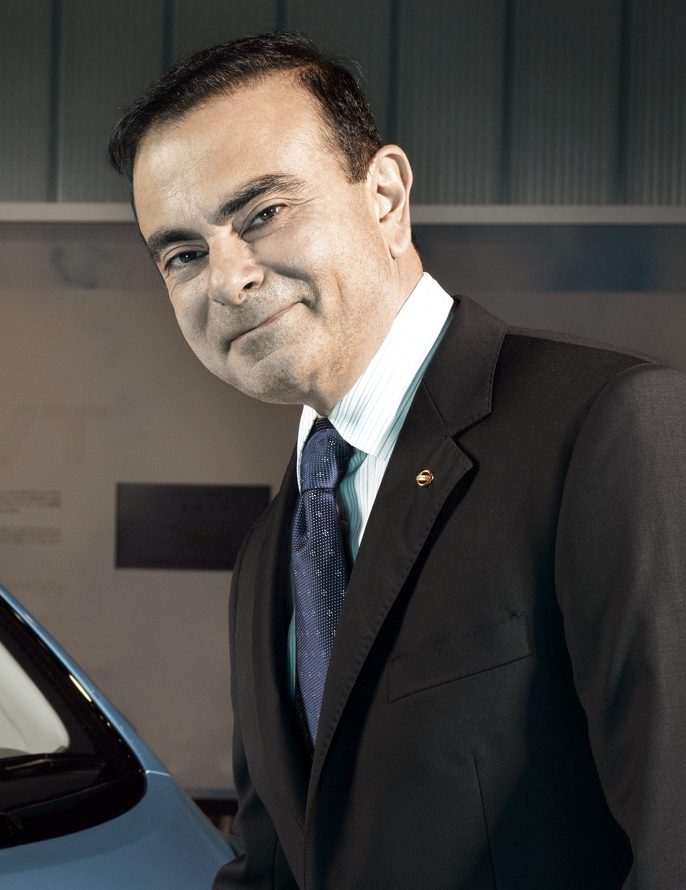
Carlos Ghosn

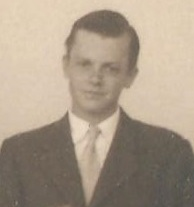
Luiz of Orléans-Braganza

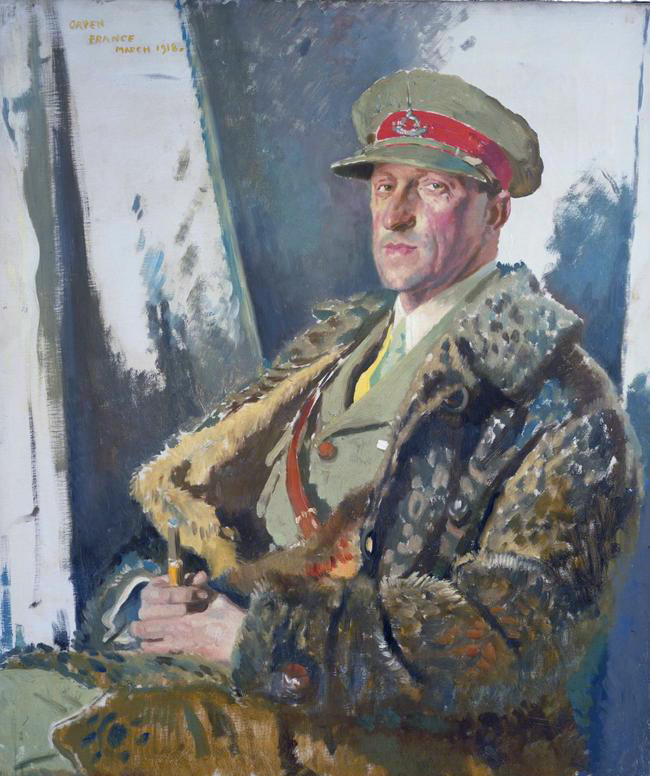
Prince Antônio Gastão of Orléans-Braganza

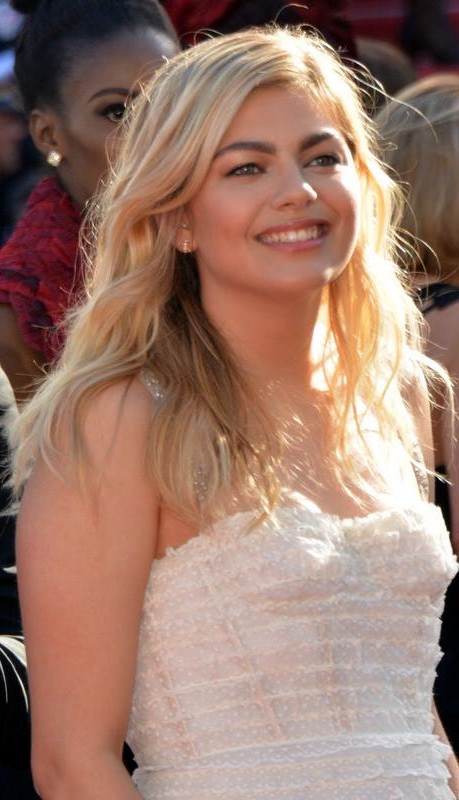
Louane

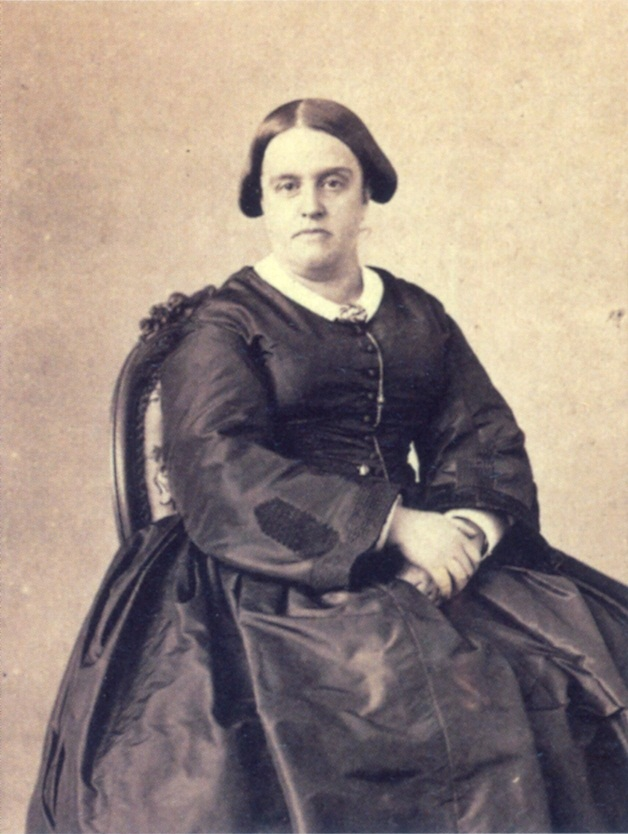
Januária of Brazil

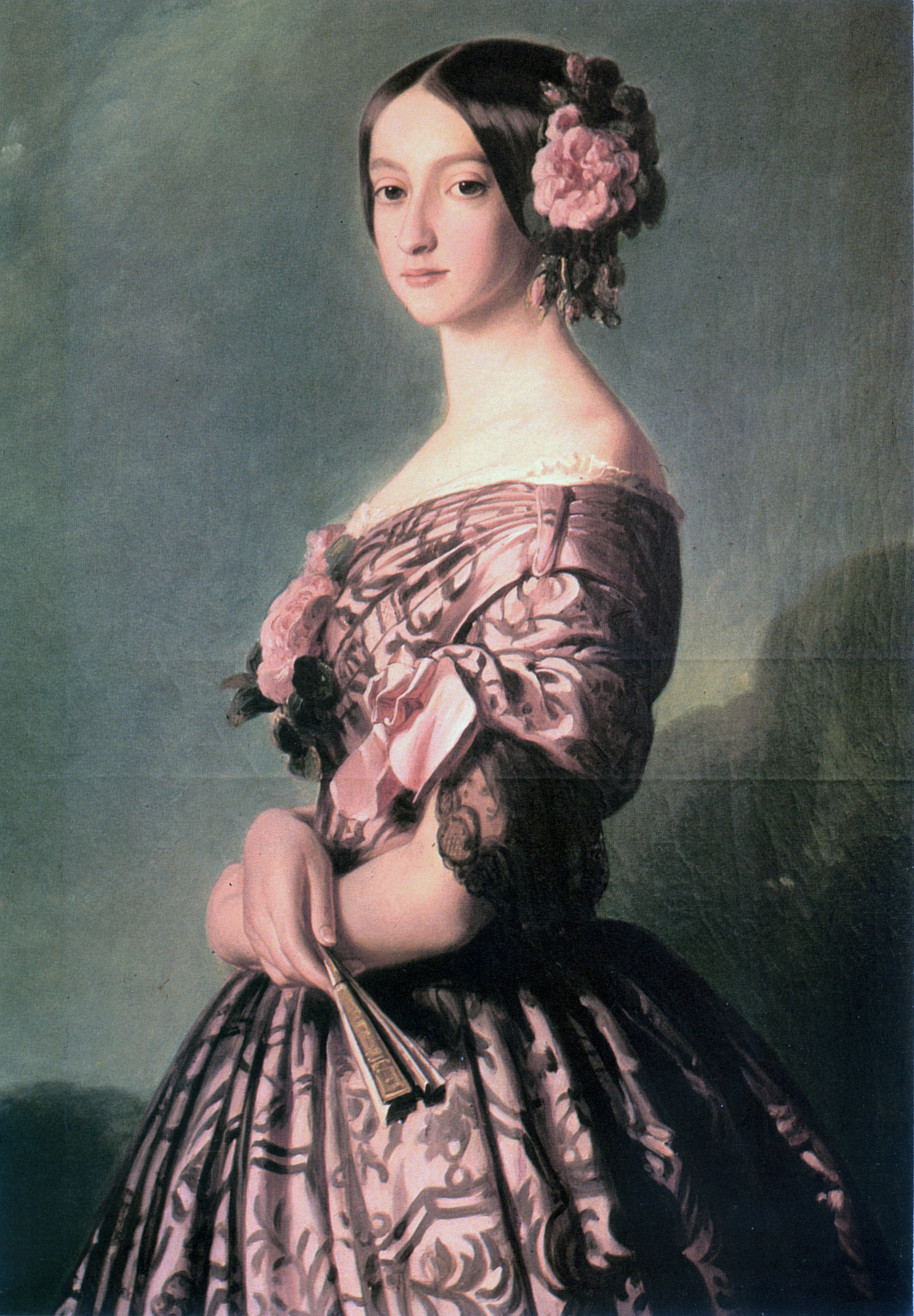
Francisca of Brazil

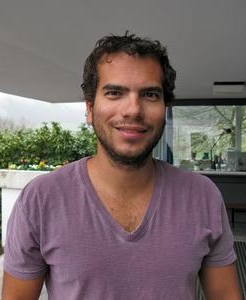
Artur Avila

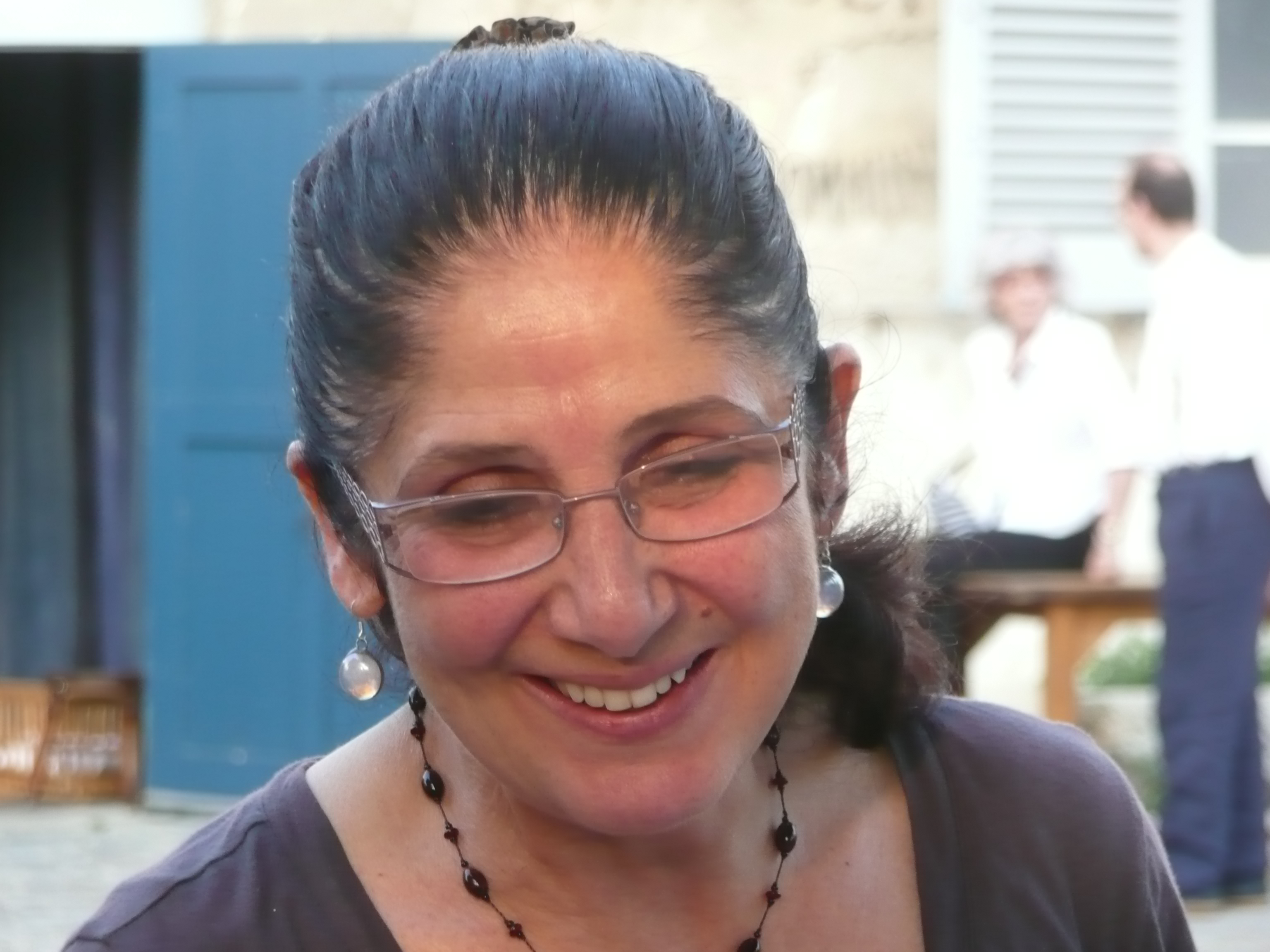
Juliana Carneiro da Cunha

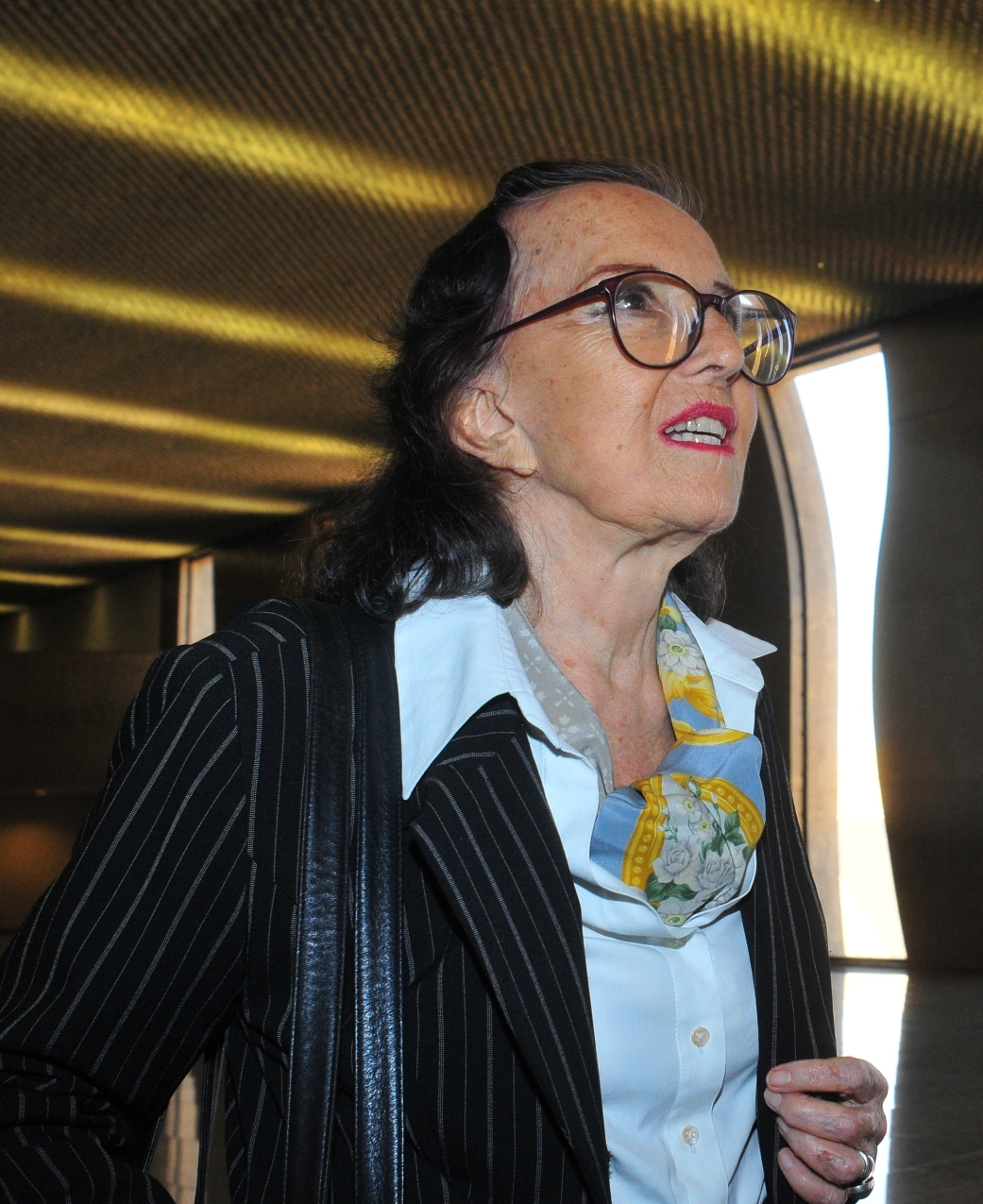
Marianne Peretti

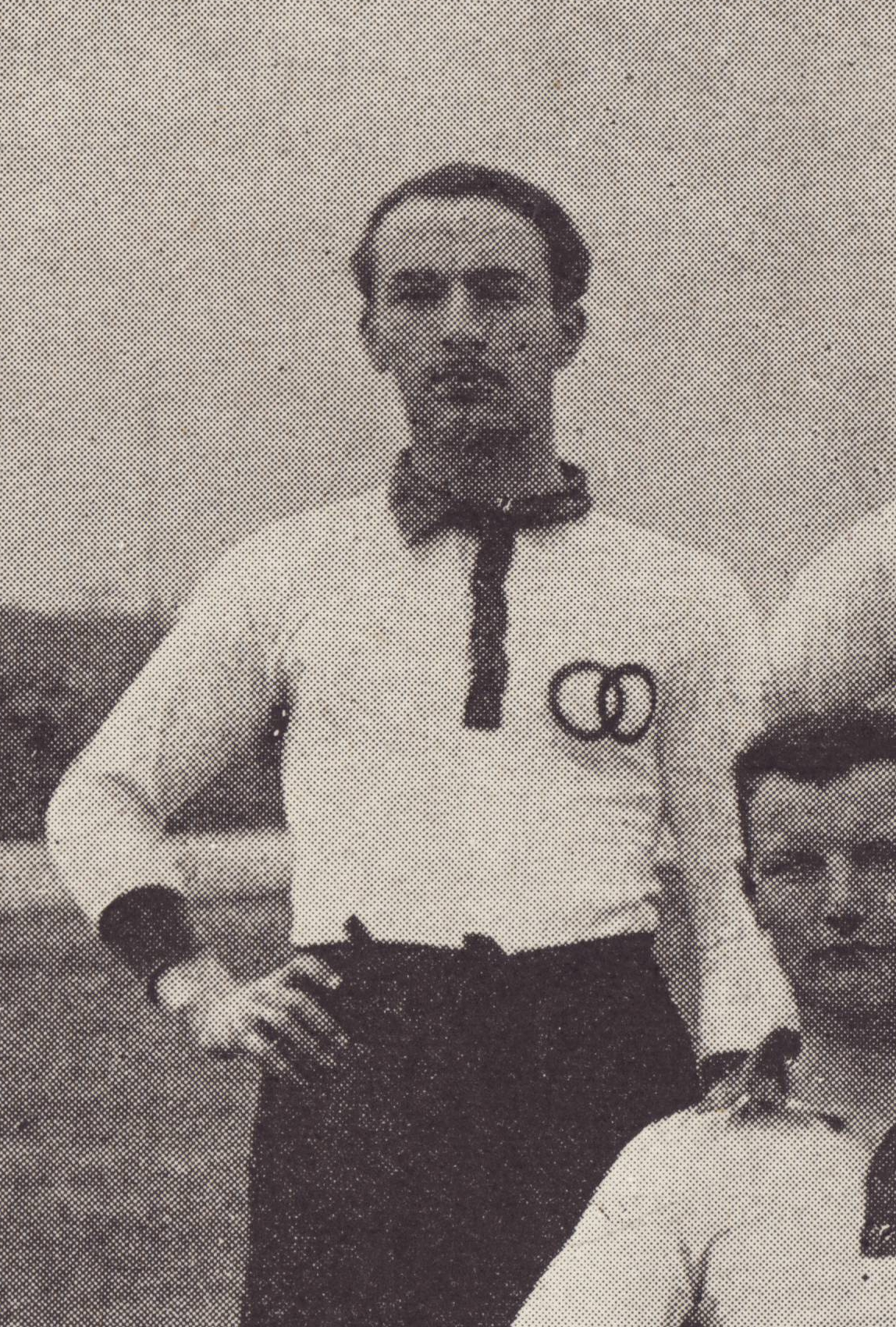
Paulo do Rio Branco

== See also ==
- Brazil–France relations
- Brazilian diaspora
- Immigration to France
- French Brazilians
