= Brazil–Canada relations =

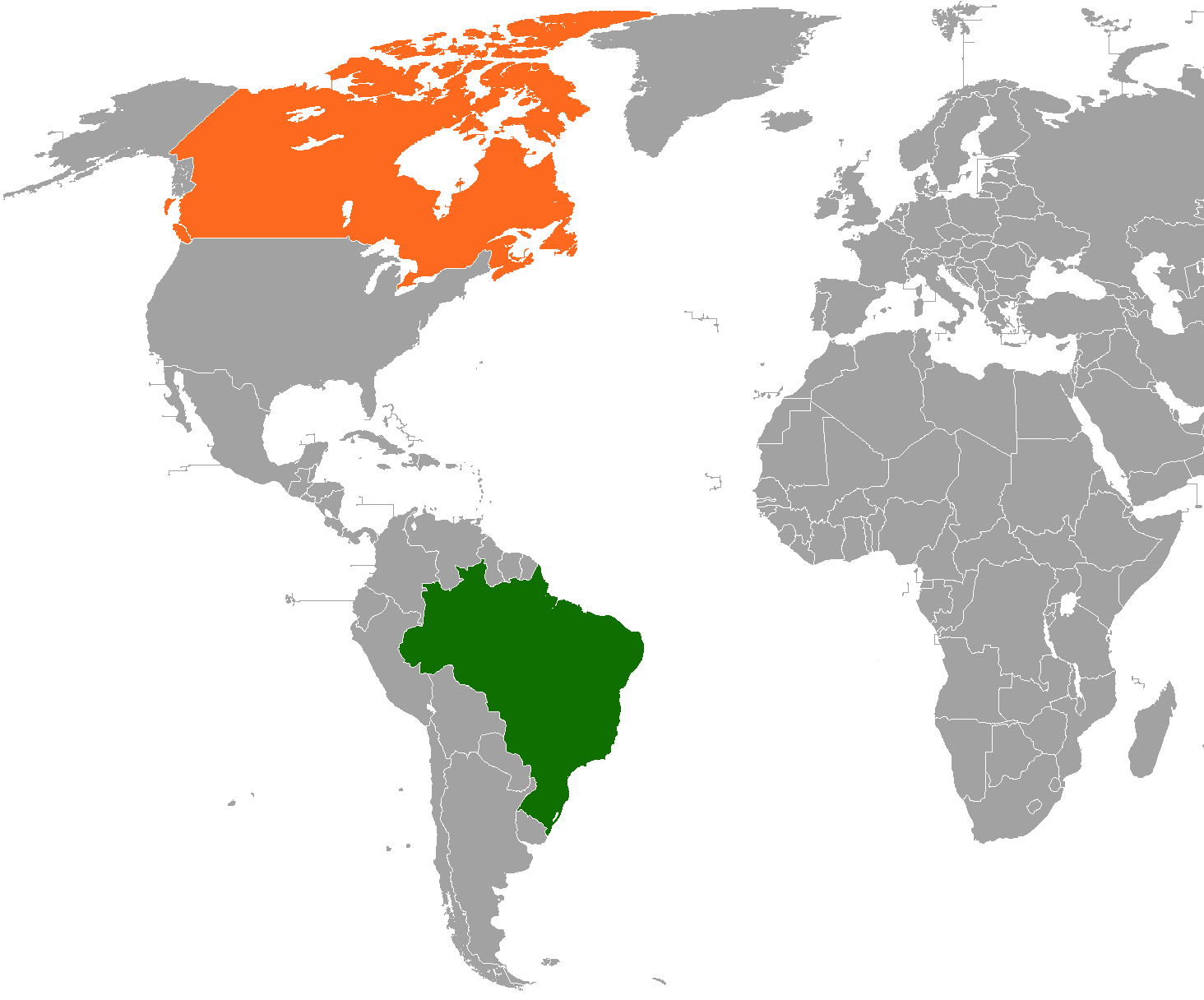

- Brazil: Canada

Diplomatic relations between Brazil and Canada were established in 1866. In addition to their bilateral relations, both nations are members of the G20, Organization of American States, United Nations and the World Trade Organization.

Brazil and Canada also share cultural ties. In 2016, approximately 36,000 people in Canada claimed Brazilian descent. It is also estimated that there are around 12,000 people in Brazil that are of Canadian descent.

== History ==
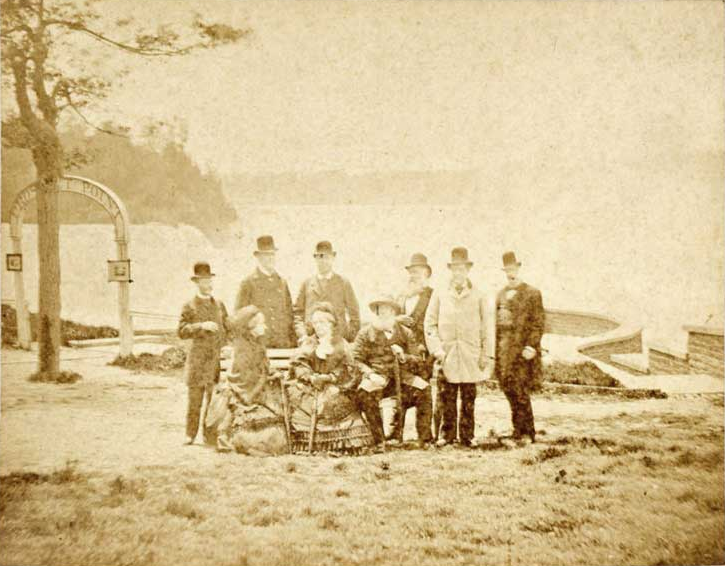
Emperor Pedro II of Brazil at Niagara Falls; 1876.

In 1866, Canada opened a consulate in Rio de Janeiro. In 1876, during his second world tour, Emperor Pedro II of Brazil paid a visit to Canada and visited the Niagara Falls and various locations within Ontario. During World War II, both nations fought side by side during the Italian campaign. In 1941, Brazil opened an embassy in Ottawa and Canada opened an embassy in Rio de Janeiro in 1944.

In January 1998, Jean Chrétien became the first Canadian Prime Minister to visit Brazil. In 2001, the visit was reciprocated when Brazilian President Fernando Henrique Cardoso paid a visit to Canada. After the initial visits, there would be several other high-level visits and reunions between leaders of both nations. Since 1998, Canada and Mercosur (which includes Brazil) have been discussing and negotiating on a free trade agreement.

Among the central themes of the bilateral relationship between both nations are partnerships in education, science, agricultural policy, technology and innovation. Canada is the country that hosts the largest number of Brazilian students, mostly interested in studying English and French for short periods of time. Both nations are major global players in medium size airplanes with Brazil's Embraer and Canada's Bombardier.

Canada is the main destination for Brazilian investment abroad, with a stock of over US$20 billion, making Brazil the seventh largest source of foreign direct investment in the country. Brazilian investments are concentrated in the mining sector. Canadian investments in Brazil, in turn, reach around US$15 billion and cover areas such as civil engineering, technology and mining.

Between 2021 and 2022, Brazil-Canada trade grew 40.9% reaching US$ 10.56 billion. In 2023, Canada and Brazil signed a defense cooperation agreement aiming to provide, among other things, mutual security training and procurement between the countries.

== High-level visits ==
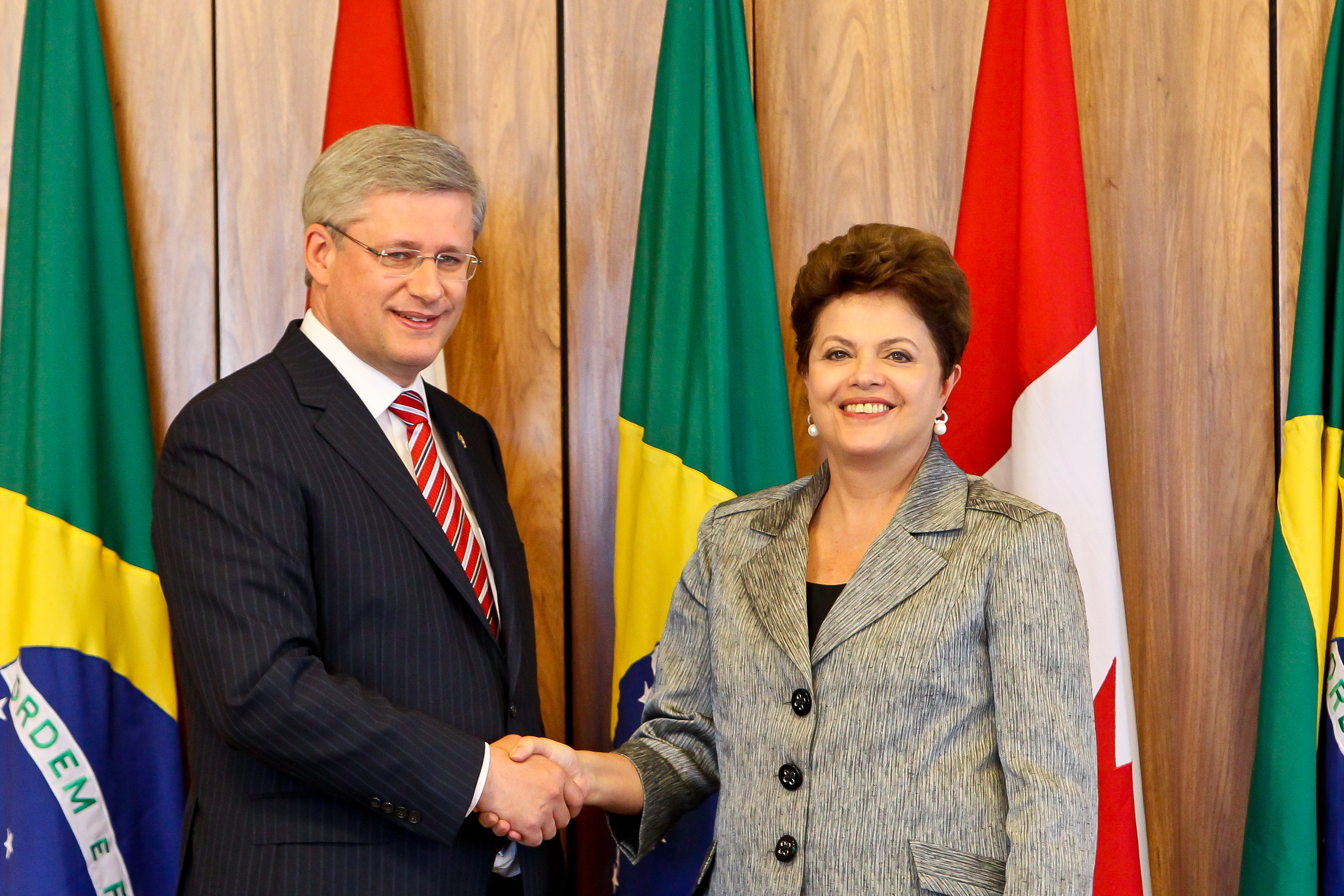
Canadian Prime Minister Stephen Harper meeting with Brazilian President Dilma Rousseff on a visit to Brasíla; 2011.

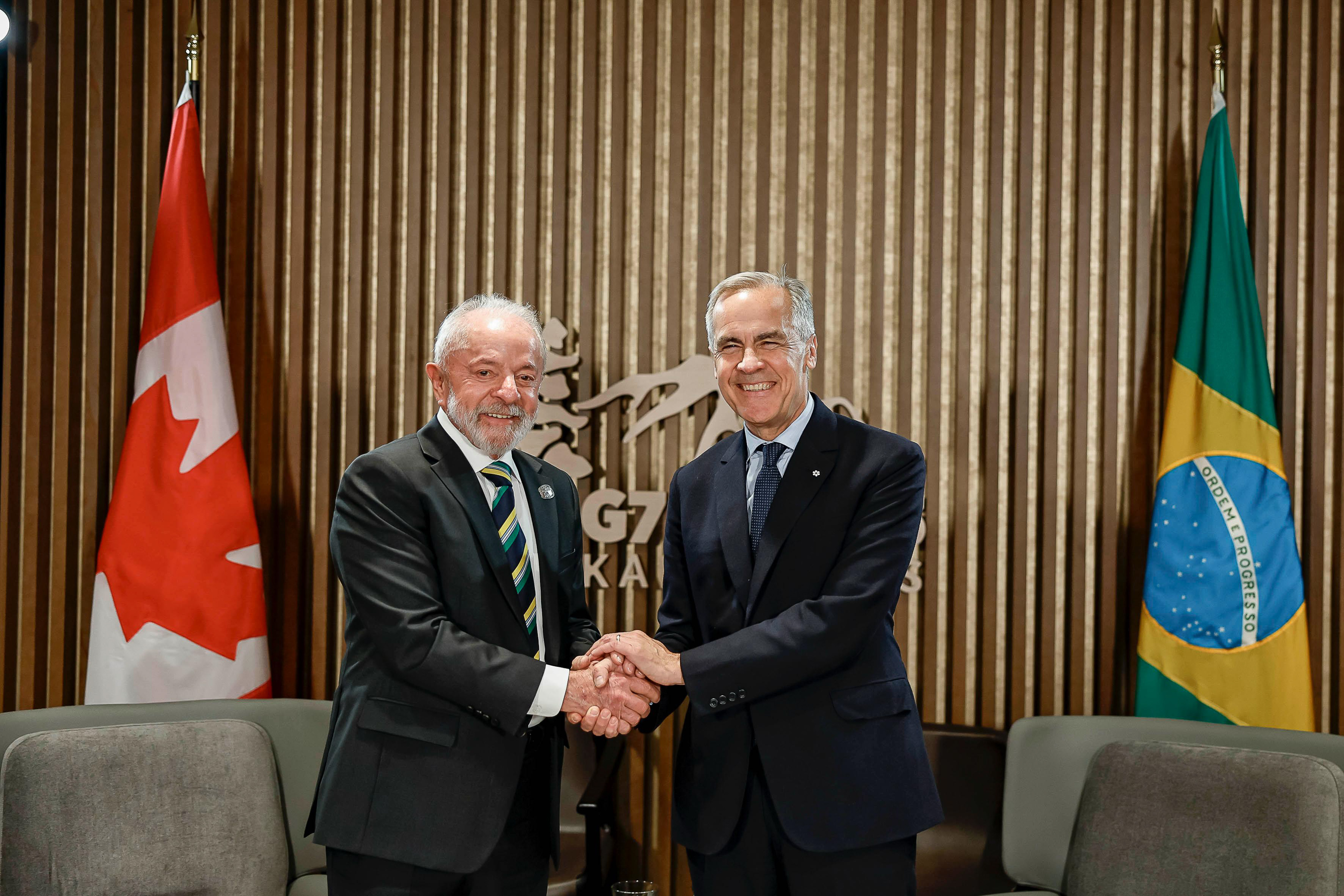
Brazilian President Luiz Inácio Lula da Silva and Canadian Prime Minister Mark Carney in Kananaskis, Canada; June 2025.

High-level visits from Brazil to Canada

- Emperor Pedro II of Brazil (1876)
- Vice President João Goulart (1956)
- Foreign Minister Ramiro Saraiva Guerreiro (1980)
- President João Figueiredo (1982)
- President Fernando Henrique Cardoso (1997, 2001)
- Foreign Minister Antonio Patriota (2012)
- President Luiz Inácio Lula da Silva (2025)

High-level visits from Canada to Brazil

- Secretary of State for External Affairs Sidney Earle Smith (1956)
- Secretary of State for External Affairs Mitchell Sharp (1968)
- Secretary of State for External Affairs Don Jamieson (1977)
- Prime Minister Pierre Trudeau (1981)
- Governor General Jeanne Sauvé (1989)
- Prime Minister Jean Chrétien (1995, 1998)
- Foreign Minister Lloyd Axworthy (1996)
- Prime Minister Paul Martin (2004)
- Governor General Michaëlle Jean (2007)
- Prime Minister Stephen Harper (2011)
- Governor General David Johnston (2012)
- Foreign Minister John Baird (2013)
- Foreign Minister Mélanie Joly (2023)
- Prime Minister Justin Trudeau (2024)

== Bilateral agreements ==
Both nations have signed a few agreements such an Agreement on Science, Technology and Innovation Cooperation (2008); Memorandum of Understanding on Sustainable Development in Minerals and Metals (2009); Agreement on Social Security (2011); Memorandum of Understanding on International Development Cooperation Effectiveness (2011); Air Transport Agreement (2011) and an Agreement to explore possible avenues for cooperation in the use of outer space for peaceful purposes (2011).

== Resident diplomatic missions ==
Of Brazil

- Ottawa (Embassy)
- Montreal (Consulate-General)
- Toronto (Consulate-General)
- Vancouver (Consulate-General)

Of Canada

- Brasília (Embassy)
- Rio de Janeiro (Consulate-General)
- São Paulo (Consulate-General)

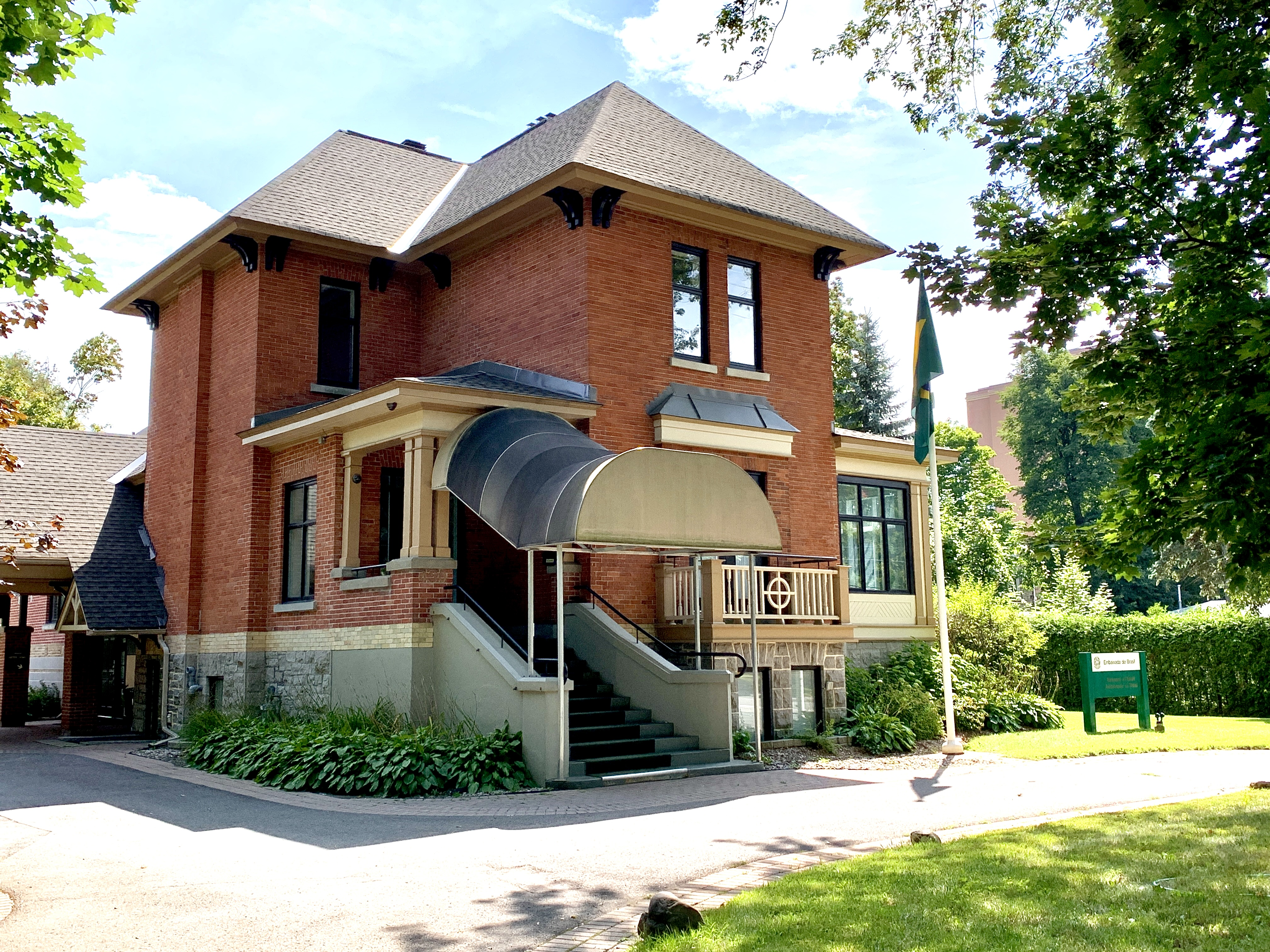
Embassy of Brazil in Ottawa

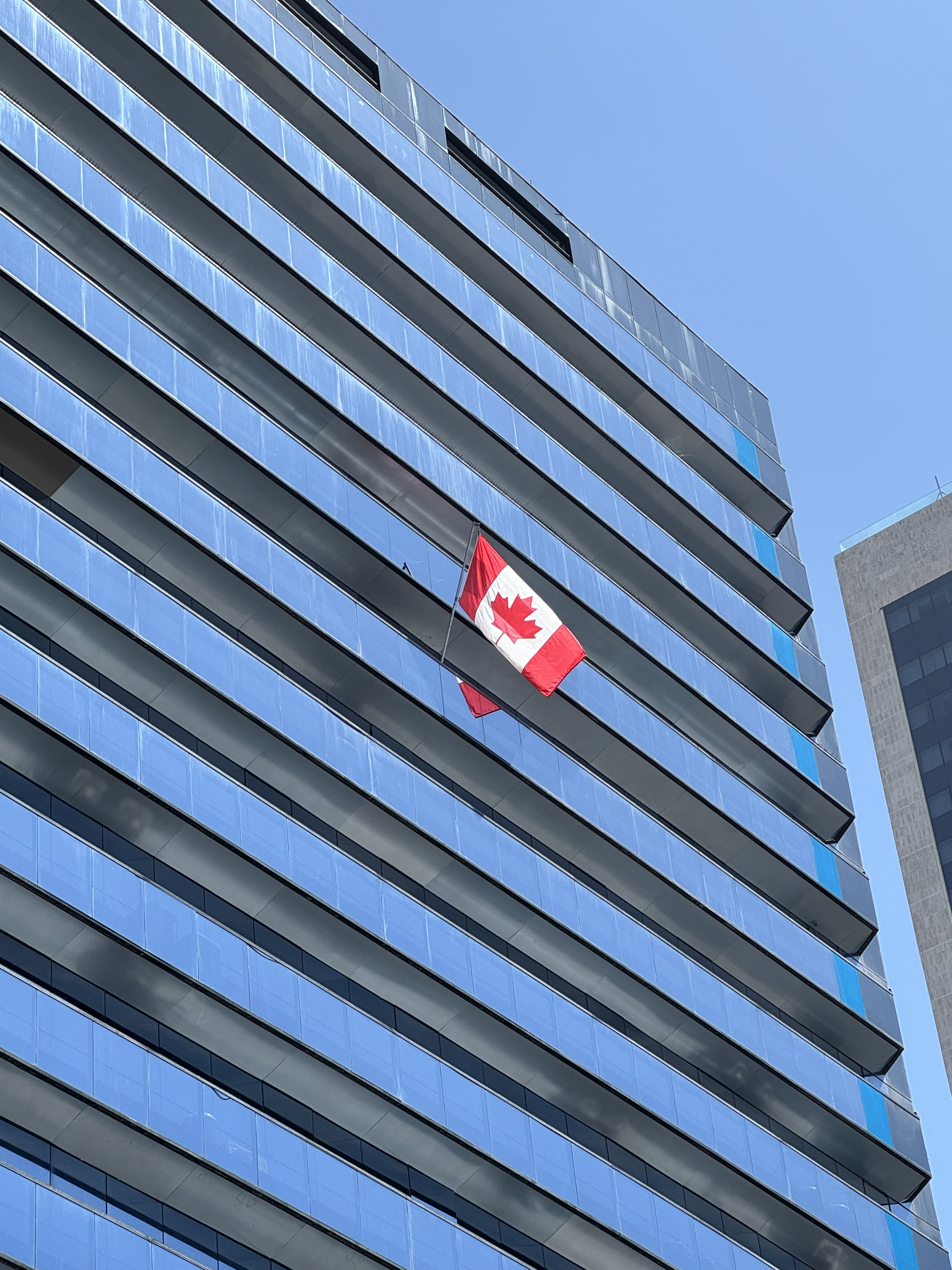
Consulate-General of Canada in Rio de Janeiro

== See also ==
- Brazilian Canadians
- Canadian Brazilians
- Embassy of Brazil in Ottawa
