= Brazilians in Suriname =

Ethnic group

Total population
- 40,000

Regions with significant populations
- Albina · Paramaribo

Languages
- Portuguese · Sranan Tongo

Religion
- Roman Catholicism

Related ethnic groups
- Brazilian diaspora

Brazilians in Suriname form a large community consisting mostly of miners. The number of Brazilians in the country is estimated at 40,000, nearly 10 percent of the population.

== Settlement ==
Suriname's low population density and abundant natural resources have attracted numerous migrants from neighboring Brazil. Over the past decade or so, as many as 40,000 Brazilians, mostly illegal immigrants, have moved to Suriname, a country with fewer than half a million citizens. Many Brazilians in Suriname work as small-scale gold miners, particularly in the town of Albina, which has become a base for nomadic gold prospectors.

== Albina riots ==
Gold mining in Albina is typically environmentally destructive and it has resulted in clashes between the miners and indigenous peoples.

In late December 2009, a series of riots occurred when local maroon inhabitants attacked Brazilian, Chinese, Colombian and Peruvian gold diggers after a man was allegedly stabbed to death by a Brazilian. The Brazilian government sent a diplomatic mission on December 27, 2009, to attend the Brazilian victims. Five Brazilians returned to Brazil on December 27 on an airplane of the Brazilian Air Force. On December 28, an airplane with capacity for 40 people was sent to the city with the purpose of rescuing more Brazilians.

== See also ==
- Brazil–Suriname relations
