= Belgian Brazilians =

Belgian Brazilian Bélgico-brasileiro
- (Belgium) (Brazil)

Total population
- 6,059

Regions with significant populations
- Brazil: Mainly Southern and Southeastern Brazil

Languages
- Predominantly Portuguese. Minority speak Dutch, French and German as first language.

Religion
- Christianity (mostly Roman Catholicism, Judaism and Protestantism), and others

Related ethnic groups
- Other Brazilian and Belgian people other White Brazilian as Luxembourger, German, Dutch, French, Spanish, Portuguese, Irish, British, Scandinavian, Polish, Czech, Austrian, Croat and Italian Brazilians Flemish people, Walloon people, Dutch people, French people, Luxembourgers

Belgian Brazilian (Portuguese: bélgico-brasileiro, belga brasileiro) is a Brazilian person of full, partial, or predominantly Belgian ancestry, or a Belgian-born immigrant in Brazil.

== History ==
Belgians have been in Brazil since colonial times. Some of the early settlers and bandeirantes from São Paulo were Belgians or had Belgian forefathers (most of them were flemings), like Cornélio de Arzam, Pedro Taques (his father was a merchant from Brabant), Fernão Dias Pais Leme (the Leme family established itself in Portugal in the late 15th century through a merchant named Martim Leme; his descendants came to São Vicente in the beginning of the colonization of Brazil), and probably Jacques Félix (it is likely that his father was also named Jacques Félix, nicknamed "the Flemish", who was from Flanders and established himself in Santos in the early 16th century). All these settlers and their relatives had huge descent, spanning the southern and central parts of Brazil. Today it is still common to find these surnames (Leme, Taques etc.) in the interior of São Paulo state and neighboring states, through people who are descendants of those settlers.

With the independence of the country in 1822, Belgians kept coming through immigration. Many colonies were founded during the 19th century, especially in Southern Brazil, but also in São Paulo, Minas Gerais, Espirito Santo and Rio de Janeiro.

== Belgian Colonies ==
- Botucatu (São Paulo – 1960);
- Taubaté (São Paulo – 1889);
- Porto Feliz (São Paulo – 1888)
- Ilhota (Santa Catarina – 1845);

== Notable Belgian Brazilians ==
- Matheus Nachtergaele, actor
- Eric Leme Walther Maleson, Bobsleigh athlete, 2002 Olympian
- Fernanda Paes Leme, actress
- Gregório Duvivier, actor, comedian and poet
- João Havelange former president of FIFA
- José Maria Eymael politician
- Igor de Camargo
- George Santos, Brazilian-American congressman and indicted alleged fraudster
- Luís Oliveira, former Belgian international footballer
- Andreas Pereira, Brazilian international footballer

== See also ==
- Immigration to Brazil
- White Brazilians
- Belgian Americans
- Flemish people
- Dutch Brazilians
- French Brazilians
- German Brazilians
- Luxembourgish Brazilians
