= Emmanuel Zamor =

Brazilian painter (c.1840–c.1919)

- Manuel Pierre Hubert Zamore
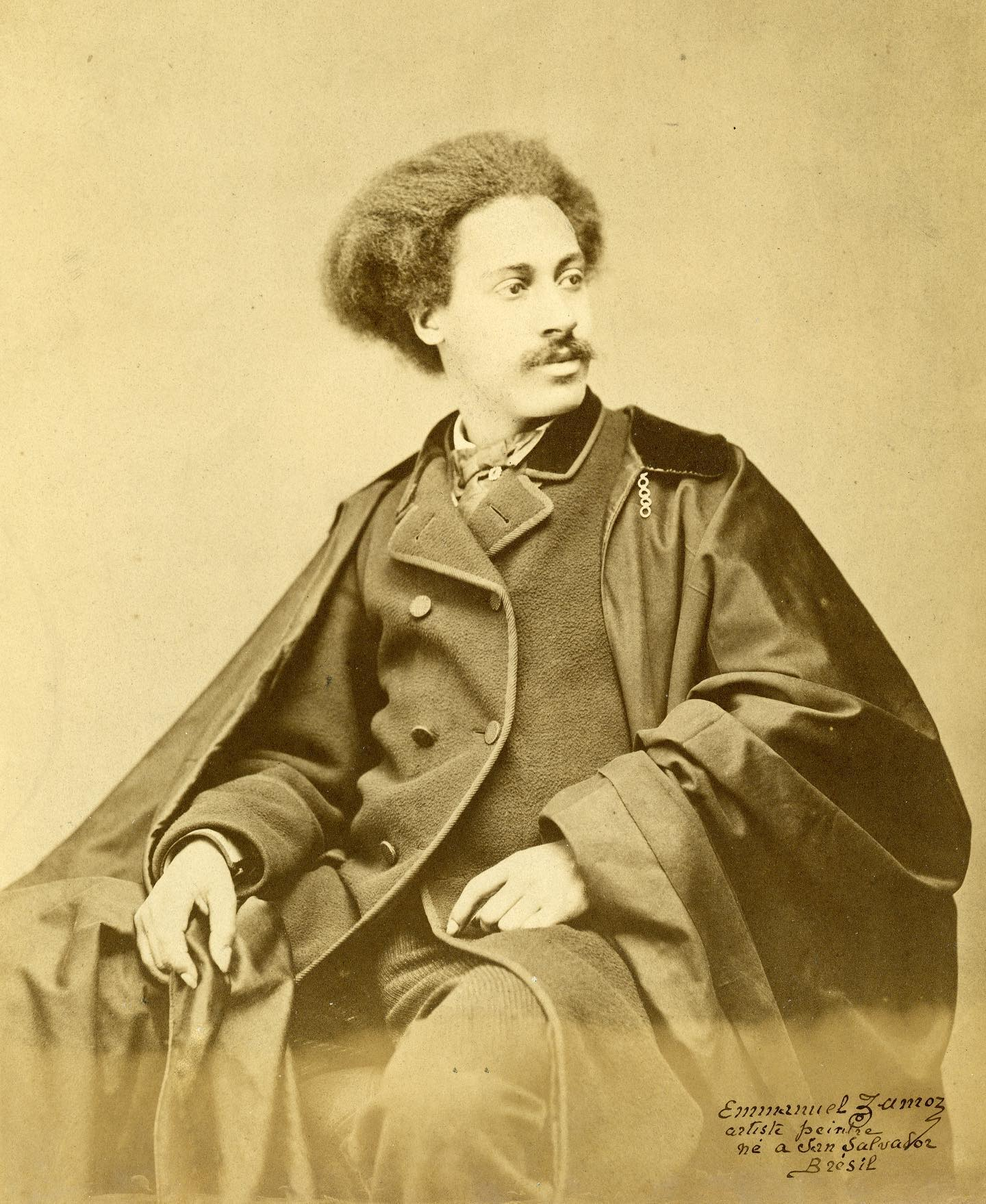
- Emmanuel Zamor (photograph attributed to Nadar)
- Born: c. 1840; Bahia
- Died: c. 1917–1919; Créteil?
- Education: Académie Julian, Paris
- Style: Barbizon school

Manuel Pierre Hubert Zamore a.k.a. Emmanuel Hector Zamor (c. 1840 – c. 1919) was a Brazilian-born painter who lived in France. He specialized in landscapes and still lifes in the style of the Barbizon school.

== Biography ==
As a child, he was apparently abandoned at the "Basílica Nossa Senhora da Conceição da Praia" in Salvador. He was adopted by a French couple, Pierre Emmanuel and Rose Zamor, and was taken to France in 1845. As soon as he was old enough, he began to study music and drawing. He later attended the Académie Julian, where he received his first exposure to contemporary trends in art.

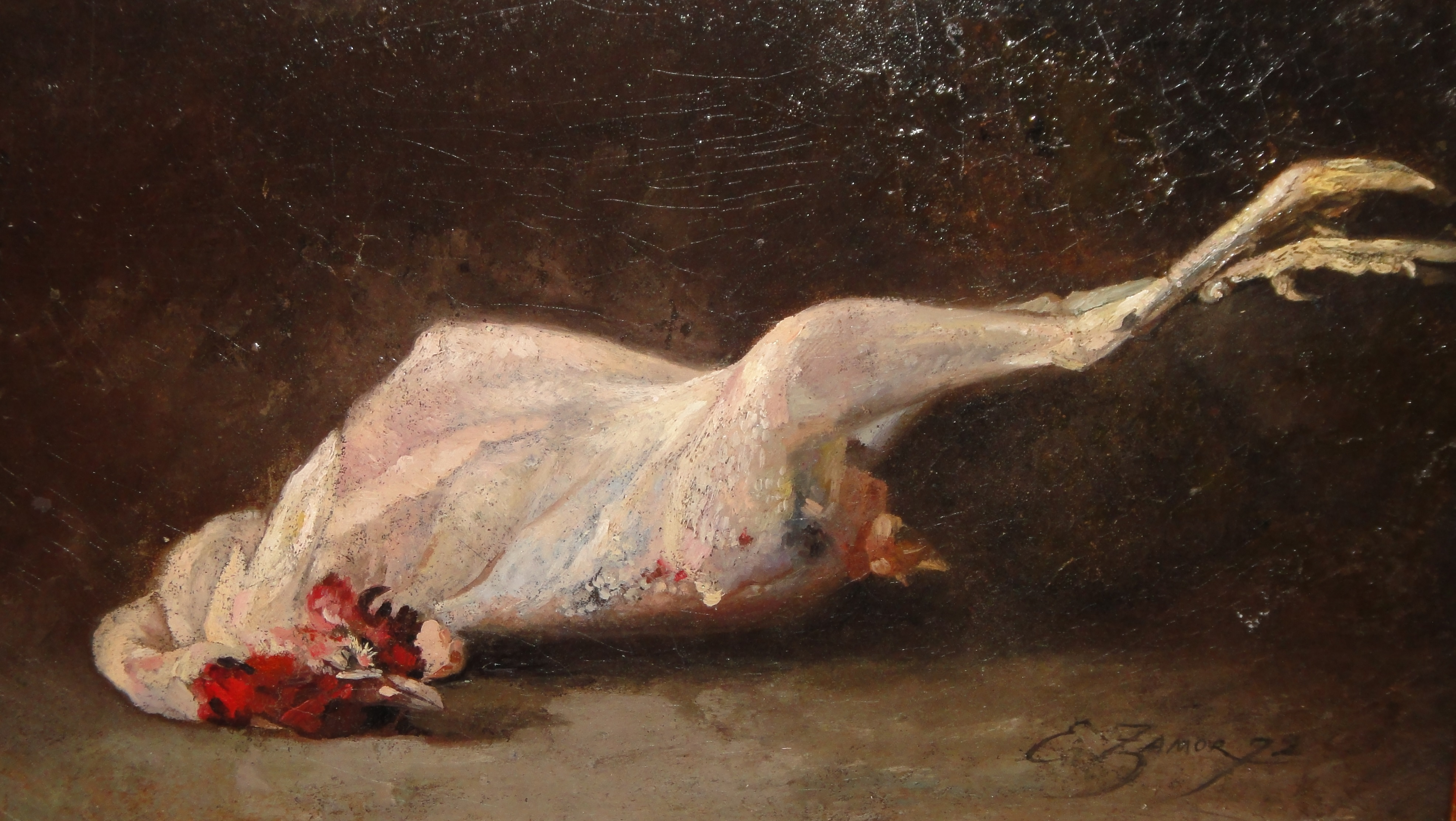
Still Life with a Chicken (1872)

In 1860, he returned to Salvador and his painting took on tropical tones and colors. Unfortunately, a fire in his home destroyed most of this early work. When his adoptive father died in 1862, he returned to France for the funeral and remained there the rest of his life.

After this point, there are numerous gaps in his life story. A photograph of him, attributed to the famous French photographer Nadar, would seem to indicate more than a little public recognition. He and his wife, however, were reported to be living in such poverty that he had to burn his paintings and canvases as firewood during the winter; a story which, if true, would help to account for the small number of his known works. He is also referred to as a set designer, although no specific projects are cited. He is thought to have died c. 1917–1919, possibly in Créteil.

His first true recognition came in 1984, when a Brazilian art dealer "discovered" his works on auction at Christie's in Paris and bought all 37 paintings being offered. They were put on display a year later at the Museu de Arte de São Paulo. A show at the Fundação Armando Alvares Penteado followed in 1990.

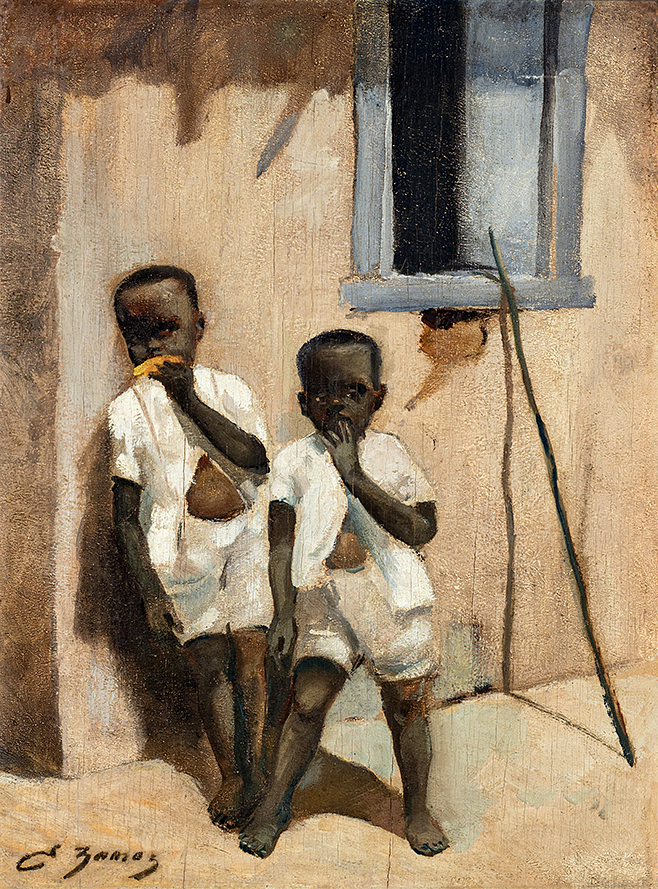
Negro Children, Museu Afro Brasil (c. 1860–1862)
