= Luxembourgish Brazilians =

- (Brazil) (Luxembourg)

Total population
- 50,000

Regions with significant populations
- Espírito Santo · Santa Catarina · Minas Gerais · Rio Grande do Sul · Paraná · São Paulo

Languages
- Portuguese · French · German · Luxembourgish · Hunsrik

Religion
- Roman Catholicism · Judaism

Related ethnic groups
- German Brazilians · Belgian Brazilians · Brazilian Jews

Luxembourgish Brazilians refers to Brazilian citizens of full, partial, or predominantly Luxembourgish ancestry, or Luxembourg-born immigrants in Brazil.

Luxembourgish immigration to Brazil occurred mainly around 1828, when nearly 1,000 Luxembourgers settled there. Many settled in Curitiba.

== See also ==
- Immigration to Brazil
- White Brazilians
- Belgian Brazilians
- Dutch Brazilians
- French Brazilians
- German Brazilians
- Luxembourgish Americans
- Luxembourgish Canadians
- Luxembourgers
