= 2009 Albina, Suriname riots =

Coordinates: 5°30′N 54°03′W

2009 Albina, Suriname riots Location of Albina within Suriname
- Location: Albina, Suriname
- Date: December 24–25, 2009 (UTC-3)
- Deaths: 1 2
- Injuries: At least 24

The 2009 Albina, Suriname riots took place on December 24–25, 2009, when local maroon inhabitants attacked Brazilian, Chinese, Colombian and Peruvian gold miners after a man was stabbed to death by a Brazilian.

One death was confirmed by the local police authorities, but Roman Catholic Brazilian priest José Vergílio, which was aiding the victims, said that at least seven people died. According to minister Chan Santokhi of Justice and Police this information was not confirmed. He stated that the stabbed person was not the only one killed.

The brazilian murder was killed to death by maroons, vehicles and houses were burned and stores owned by Chinese were plundered. According to the Surinamese government, 20 women were raped, one of which was pregnant and lost her baby in the trauma.

At least 24 people were injured during the riots. The injured were transported to a military hospital, while the Brazilians living in Albina were transferred to Paramaribo. Brazilians and Chinese living in the region have been evacuated. According to eyewitnesses, 17 people are missing.

The Brazilian government sent a diplomatic mission on December 27, 2009, to attend the Brazilian victims. Five Brazilians returned to Brazil on December 27 on an airplane of the Brazilian Air Force. On December 28, an airplane with capacity for 40 people was sent to the city with the purpose of rescuing more Brazilians. The Surinamese government sent in troops to conduct searches and keep the peace, although violence is over by all accounts. Suriname officials have come out saying they have the forces to protect all foreigners in the country and have already taken several people into custody for questioning. 35 suspects were arrested on December 28, according to the city's chief of police, Krishna Mathoera-Hussainali.

== Background ==
Albina is primarily a base for nomadic gold prospectors. The town is made up of people from Suriname, neighboring French Guiana, the People's Republic of China and Brazil.

There are between 15,000 and 18,000 Brazilian nomad gold diggers in Suriname, or about 4% of the total population of the country, most of them living illegally. They are some of the poorest people in Brazil, mostly from the Northeast Region.

Tensions in gold prospecting villages like Albina are not sporadic, but violence is quite uncommon. Gold diggers often come in conflict with indigenous people in their search to find and extract gold from remote areas.
