= Brazil–France relations =

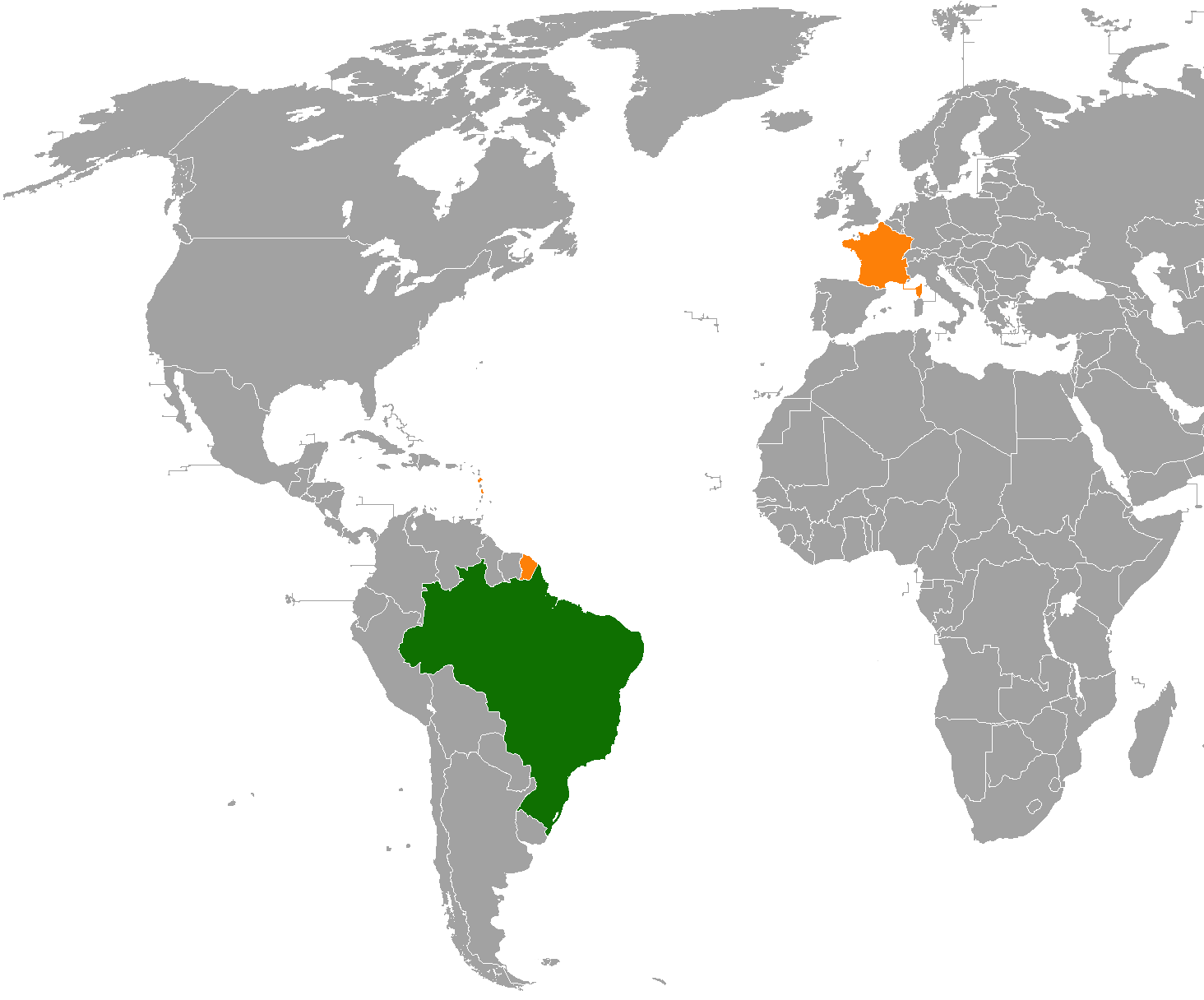
- Brazil: France

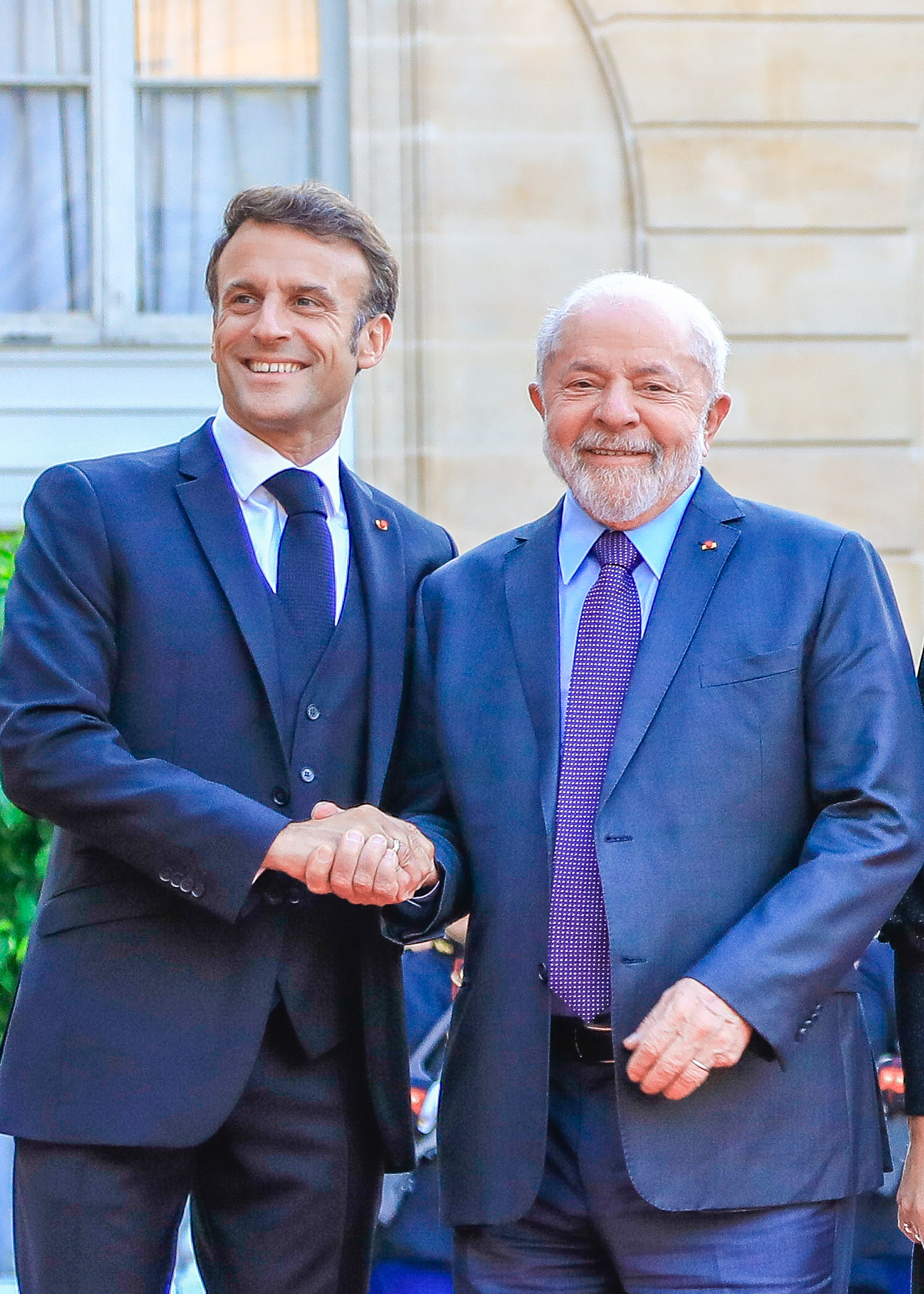
French President Emmanuel Macron greets Brazilian President Luiz Inácio Lula da Silva for a state banquet at the Élysée Palace in 2023.

Brazil–France relations are the bilateral and historical relations between the Federative Republic of Brazil and the French Republic.

France and Brazil share a 730km long-border via the French department of Guiana, the longest international border of France.

The two countries are committed to strengthening their bilateral cooperation in the areas for which working groups have been created: nuclear energy, renewable energies, defence technologies, technological innovation, joint cooperation in African countries and space technologies, medicines and the environment.

Brazil and France entered a formal strategic alliance in 2008. France supports Brazil's ambition to become a global player on the international scene, and has been a strong supporter of the Brazilian bid for a permanent seat on the United Nations Security Council. Through significant technology transfers, France intends to help Brazil acquire key technologies of a major world power in the military, space, energy and technology sectors.

According to a 2013 BBC World Service Poll, 54% of French people view Brazil's influence positively, with 32% expressing a negative view, while 50% of Brazilians view France's influence positively, with 19% expressing a negative view.

== History ==
Timeline of bilateral relations
1825	France is the first European country to recognize the independence of Brazil.
1959	Inauguration of the House of Brazil (Casa do Brasil) at the University of Paris.
2003	France invites Brazil to participate at the G8 Summit in Evian.
2004	Creation of the Action Against Hunger and Poverty by initiative of Presidents Lula and Chirac; Creation of the United Nations Stabilisation Mission in Haiti.
2005	Year of Brazil in France.
2008	Brazil and France enter a strategic alliance.
2009	Year of France in Brazil.
2024	French president Emmanuel Macron visits Brazil following an invitation by Brazilian President Lula.
2025	Year of Brazil in France.

In 2019, Brazilian President Jair Bolsonaro commented that he would only accept $20 million in G7 aid to fight the Amazon rainforest wildfires if French President Emmanuel Macron retracted criticisms which he found offensive, accusing Macron of a "colonialist mentality".

After a period of relative isolation and neglect under Bolsonaro, Brazil re-engaged in partnerships with France under President Luiz Inácio Lula da Silva, notably in green policies and defense projects such as the extension of the Franco-Brazilian Submarine Development Program.

== Trade relations ==
Brazil is France's leading trade partner in Latin America and its fourth most important partner outside OECD. Over 500 French companies are established directly in Brazil and employ over 250,000 people. Total trade between the two countries surpassed $6.5 billion dollars in 2009.

	2003	2004	2005	2006	2007	2008	2009
(France) French exports to Brazil	$1.8 billion	$2.3 billion	$2.7 billion	$2.8 billion	$3.5 billion	$4.7 billion	$3.6 billion
(Brazil) Brazilian exports to France	$1.7 billion	$2.2 billion	$2.5 billion	$2.7 billion	$3.5 billion	$4.1 billion	$2.9 billion
Total trade	$3.5 billion	$4.5 billion	$5.2 billion	$5.5 billion	$7 billion	$8.8 billion	$6.5 billion
Note: All values are in U.S. dollars. Source:.

== Cultural relations ==
Brazil is France's leading partner in Latin America for cultural, scientific, and technical cooperation. Three French secondary schools (Brasília, Rio, and São Paulo) have a total of 2,150 students; 1,000 of whom are French. The Alliances françaises in Brazil constitute the oldest and most extensive in the world (74 establishments in 52 cities). Brazil, through its past and present connections to France, is eligible for membership with the Organisation internationale de la Francophonie. Both countries also share the distinction of being the largest Roman Catholic-majority countries by population on their respective continents.

== Cross-border cooperation ==
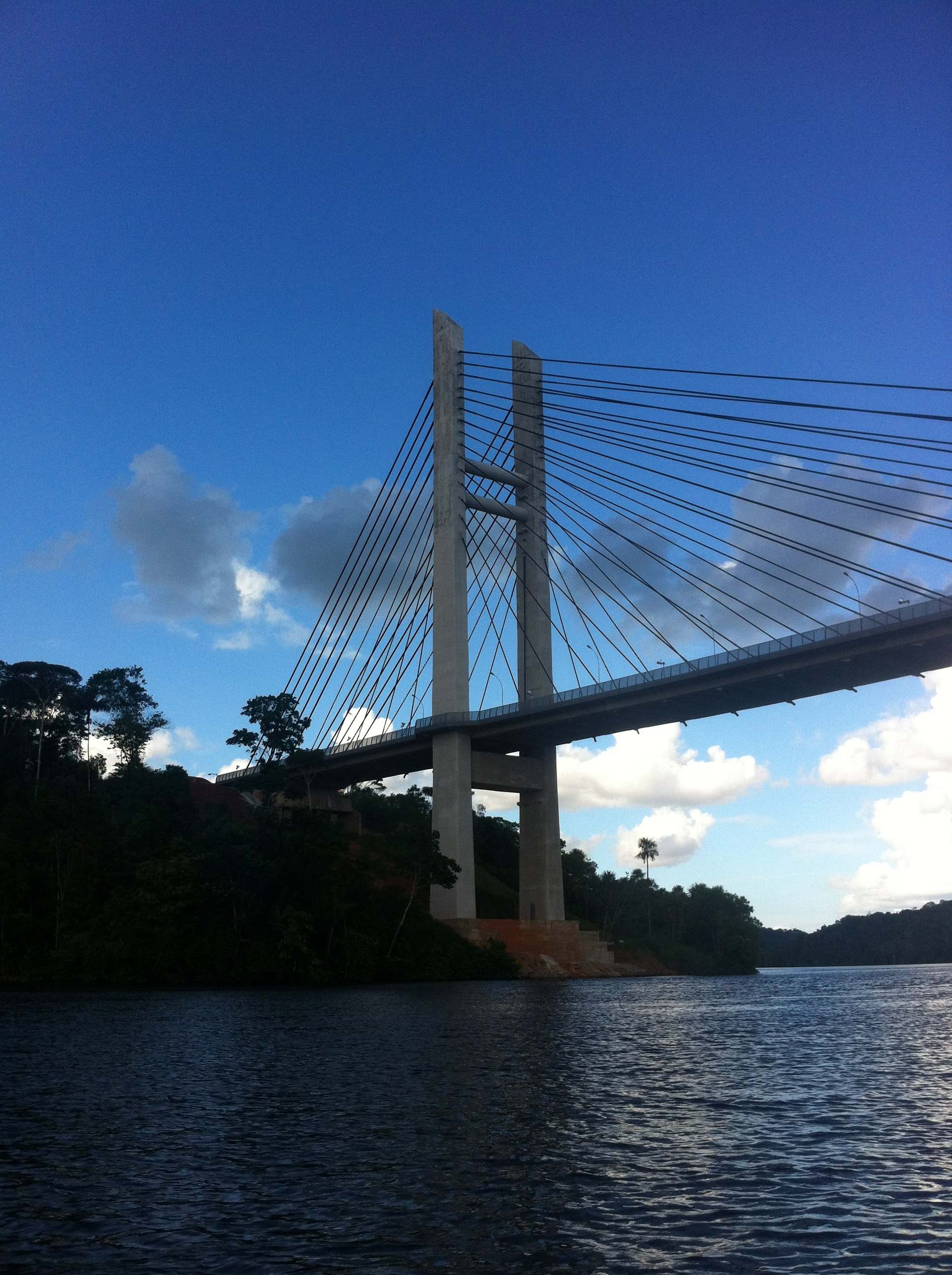
The Oyapock River Bridge

Brazil and France share a 730 km border between the state of Amapá and the overseas department of French Guiana. The cross-border cooperation between the two countries has enjoyed increased vitality. This cooperation makes it possible to better integrate French Guiana into its geographical environment, to respond to the concerns of both parties about the various cross-border risks, to encourage human exchanges and trade and to develop the economy of the Amazon region, respecting the local populations and extraordinary environment. The granting to France, on the initiative of Brazil, of observer status within the Amazon Cooperation Treaty Organization, will strengthen this cooperation. The construction of the Oyapock River Bridge over the Oyapock River, decided during President Lula’s visit to France, made the Cayenne-Macapá road link possible. The bridge was opened in 2017.

== Military cooperation ==
Defence cooperation has undergone major developments in recent years. On July 15, 2005, Brazil and France signed several military cooperation agreements in areas such as aviation and advanced military technologies. On 2008, the two countries entered a Status of Forces Agreement. On 23 December 2008, Brazil and France established a formal strategic alliance.

Brazil and France signed a major defense pact on December 24, 2008. At the occasion, the Brazilian government purchased 50 EC-725 Super Cougar helicopters, a nuclear submarine, and four Scorpène-class submarines from the French government worth an estimated $12 billion. Brazilian President Luiz Inácio Lula da Silva and French President Nicolas Sarkozy signed an accord approving the sale in Rio de Janeiro. All these contracts come with significant technology transfer and offer considerable participation prospects for the Brazilian industry. The helicopters will be built locally by the Brazilian firm Helibras in partnership with Eurocopter. The four conventional Scorpènes will also be built locally, in a new shipyard being built by Odebrecht and DCNS in Itaguaí, state of Rio de Janeiro.

In September 2009, the two countries announced a joint venture between Agrale and Renault Trucks to produce military transport vehicles.

In late 2019, it was reported that, under then-president Jair Bolsonaro, the Brazilian military viewed France as its biggest potential threat due to disputes over the Amazon rainforest.

== Transportation ==
There are direct flights between Brazil and France with the following airlines: Air France, LATAM Brasil and Azul. A road connects the French city of Cayenne to Macapá in Brazil, via. a bridge over the Oyapock River, which is known as the N2 in French Guiana, and BR-156 in Brazil.

== Lobster War ==
When the Brazilian navy moved to intercept French lobster fisherman off the coast of the state of Pernambuco in 1961, the French Navy deployed vessels in response. This is considered a bloodless war as no casualties occurred nor violence.

== Scientific cooperation ==
France is Brazil's second-leading scientific partner, after the United States. Brazil is France's leading scientific partner in Latin America. The two countries cooperate in the areas of climate change, sustainable development, biodiversity, technological innovation and the genome.

== Resident diplomatic missions ==
Of Brazil

- Paris (Embassy and Consulate-General)
- Marseille (Consulate-General)
- Cayenne (Consulate-General)
- Saint-Georges de l'Oyapock (Consulate)

Of France

- Brasília (Embassy)
- Recife (Consulate-General)
- Rio de Janeiro (Consulate-General)
- São Paulo (Consulate-General)

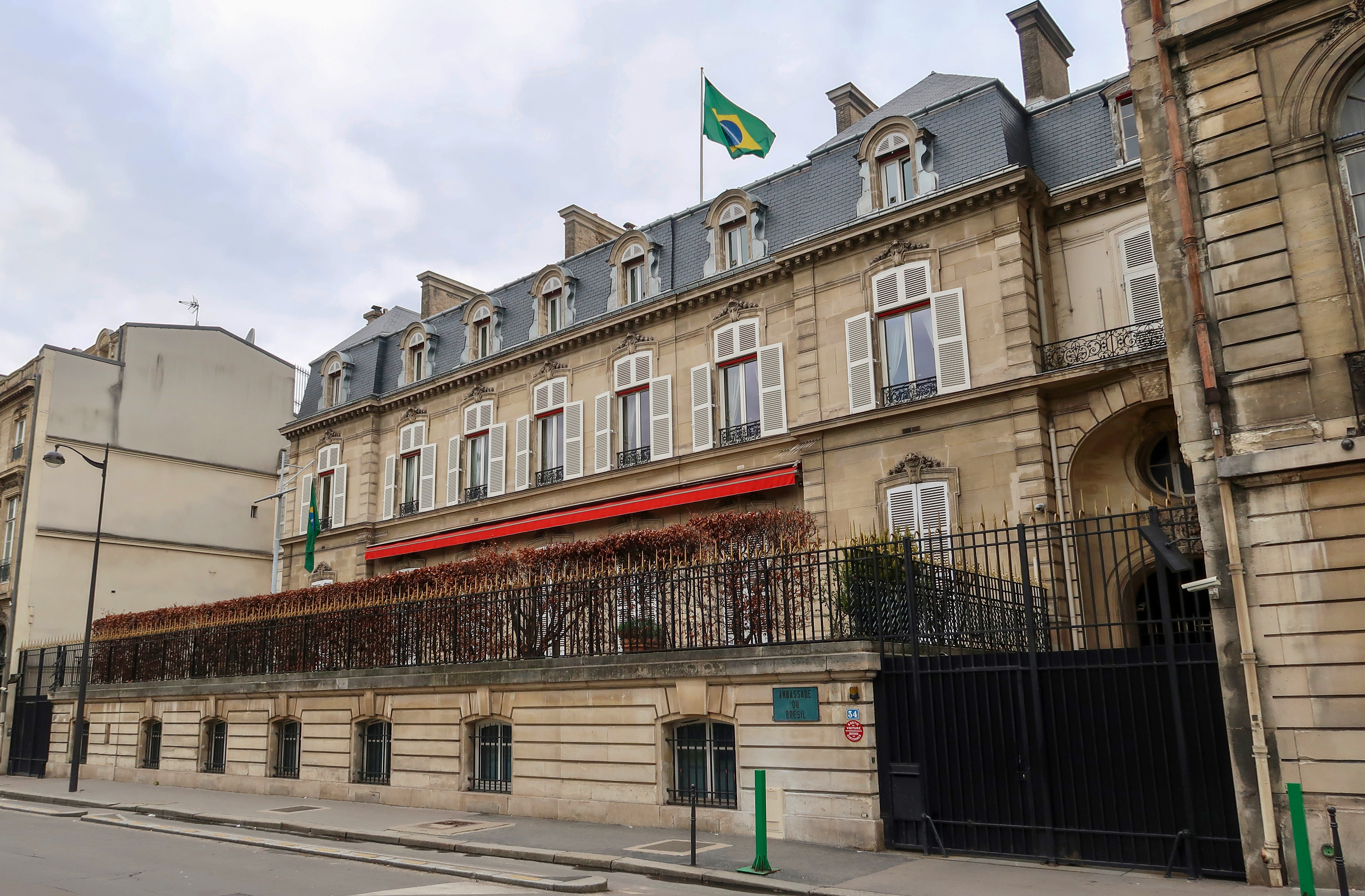
Embassy of Brazil in Paris

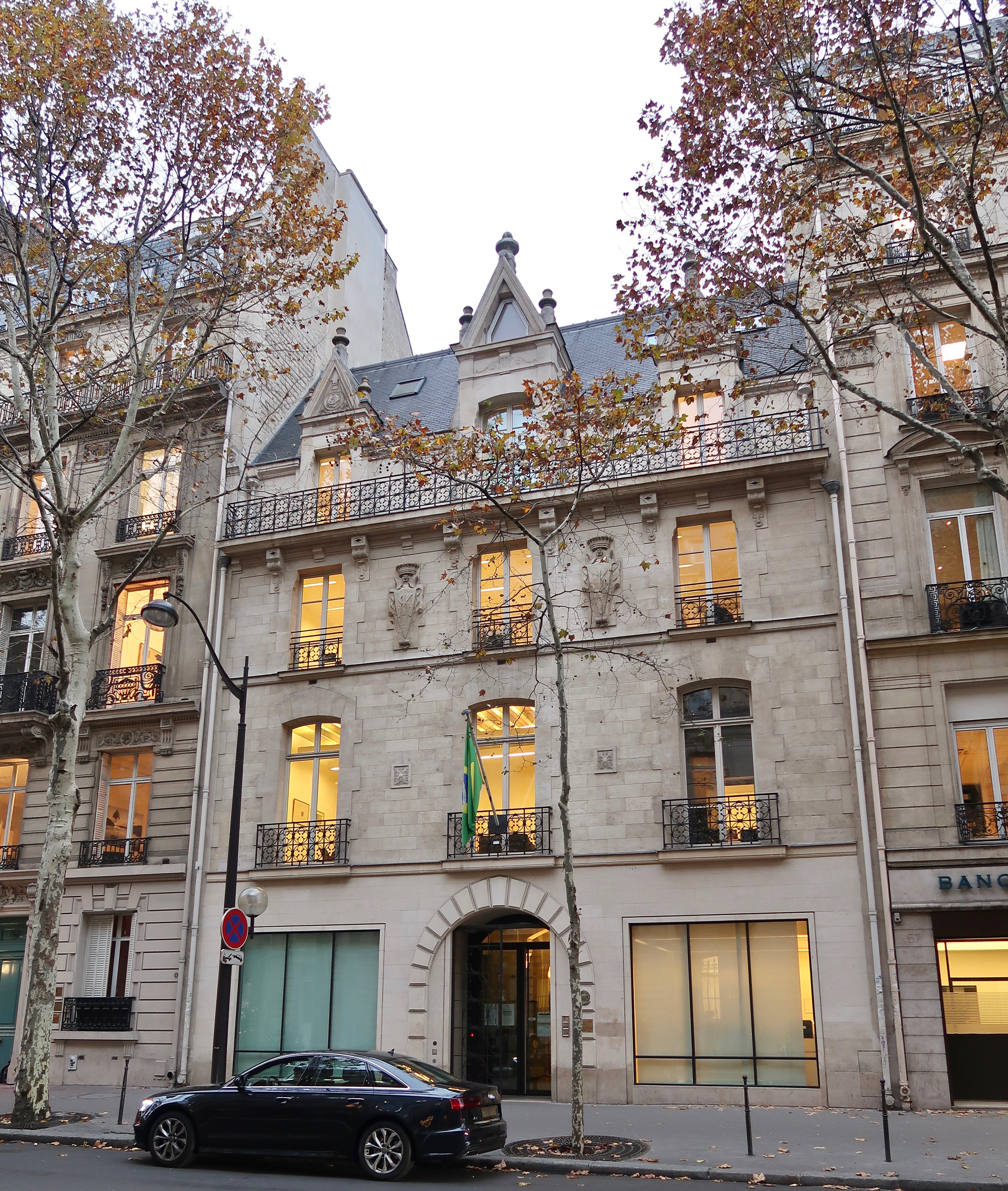
Consulate-General of Brazil in Paris

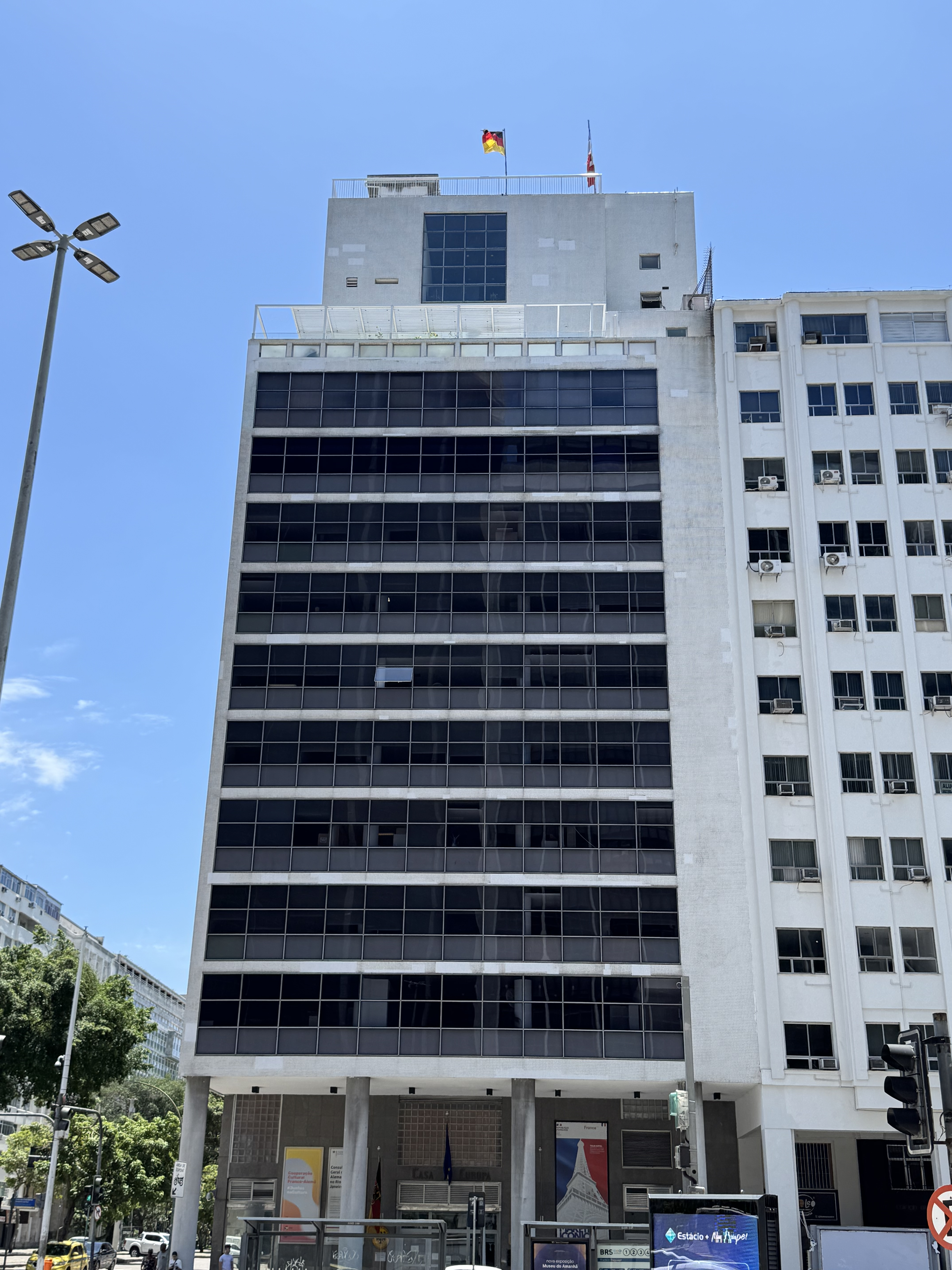
Consulate-General of France in Rio de Janeiro

== See also ==
- Foreign relations of Brazil
- Foreign relations of France
- French Brazilian
- Brazilians in France
- French invasions in Brazil
