= Brazil–European Union relations =

- European Union: Brazil

Brazil and the European Union established diplomatic relations in 1960. The European Union and Brazil have close historical, cultural, economic and political ties. At the 1st EU-Brazil summit, in 2007, Brazil entered in a strategic partnership with the European Union, strengthening their ties. This new relationship places Brazil high on the EU's political map.

== Comparison ==
Comparison of the European Union and Brazil
Metric	European Union	Brazil
Population	447,206,135	210,620,000
Area	4,232,147 km^{2} (1,634,041 sq mi)	8,516,000 km^{2} (3,288,000 sq mi)
Population Density	115/km^{2} (300 /sq mi)	24.66/km^{2} (63.1/sq mi)
Capital	Brussels (de facto)	Brasília
Global cities	Paris, Amsterdam, Milan, Frankfurt, Madrid, Brussels	São Paulo, Rio de Janeiro, Belo Horizonte
Government	Supranational parliamentary democracy based on the European treaties	Federal presidential constitutional republic
First Leader	High Authority President Jean Monnet	Emperor Pedro I
Current Leader	Council President António Costa; Commission President Ursula von der Leyen; Parliament President Roberta Metsola	President Luiz Inácio Lula da Silva
Official languages	Languages of the EU	Portuguese
GDP (nominal)	$16.033 trillion ($35,851 per capita)	$1.37 trillion ($6,232.62 per capita)

== Agreements ==
The present relationship is governed by the EC-Brazil Framework Cooperation Agreement (1992), EU-Mercosul Framework Cooperation Agreement (1995) and the Agreement for Scientific and Technological Cooperation (2004). The EU is currently seeking a free trade agreement with Mercosur, the regional trade bloc of which Brazil is a part.

== Trade ==
The EU is Brazil's leading trade partner and represented 18.3% of Brazil's total trade in 2017. In 2007, the EU imported €32.3 billion in Brazilian goods and exported €21.2 billion in goods to Brazil. Brazil's exports to the EU are mainly primary products (primarily agricultural) however a third is made up of manufactured products. The EU's exports to Brazil are mainly manufactured machinery, transport equipment and chemicals. In terms of goods, Brazil has a trade surplus with the EU; however including services it has a deficit. The EU is also a major investor in Brazil with investment capital amounting to €88 billion in 2006 making it the largest single investor in the country.

EU – Brazil trade in 2007
Direction of trade	Goods	Services	Investment flow	Investment stocks
EU to Brazil	€21.2 billion	€5.1 billion	€5.1 billion	€88 billion
Brazil to EU	€32.3 billion	€4.6 billion	€1.1 billion	€10.5 billion

== Cross-border cooperation ==
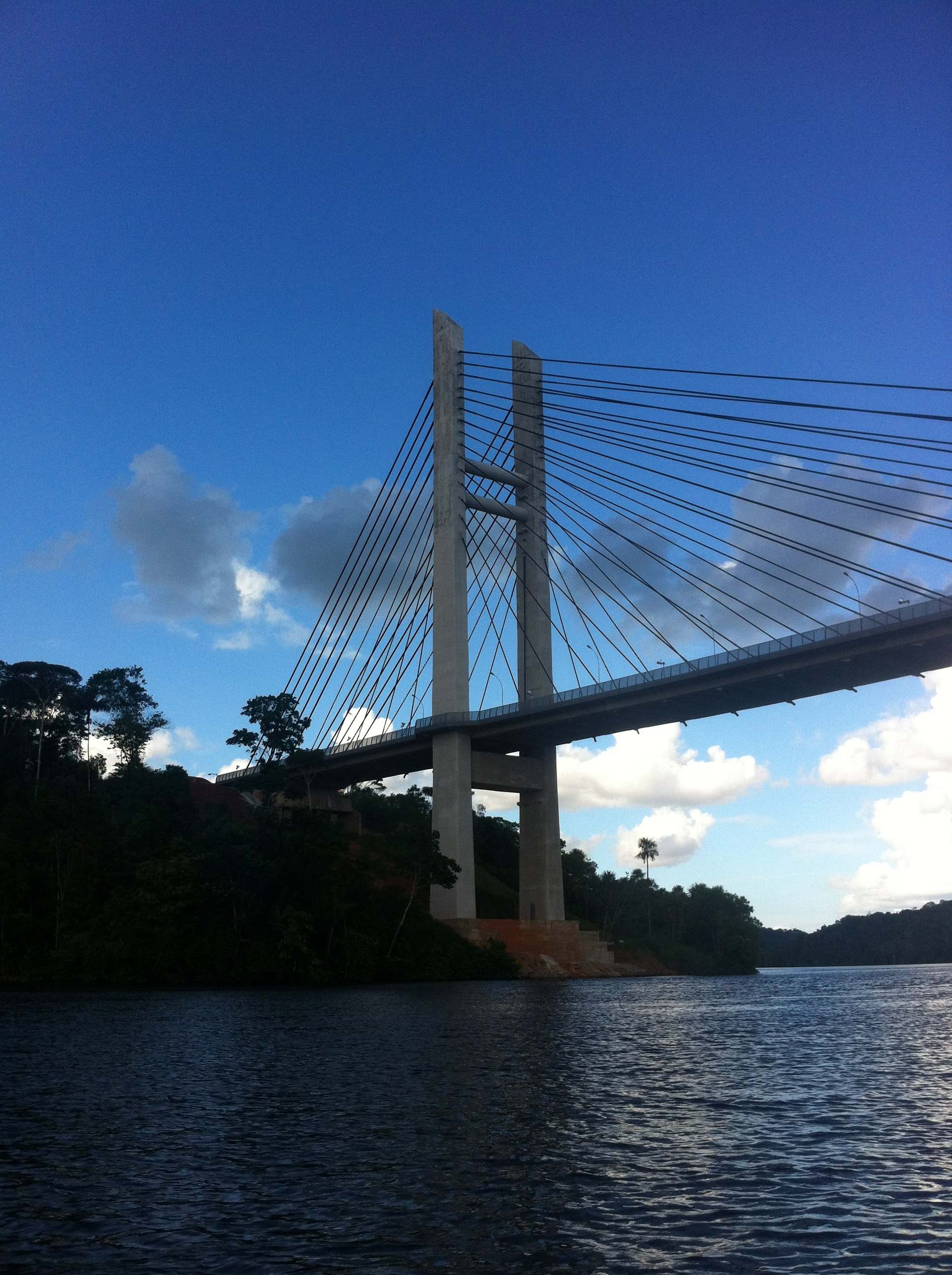
The Oyapock River Bridge

Brazil and the EU share a 673 km border between the state of Amapá and the French overseas department of French Guiana. The cross-border cooperation between the two countries has enjoyed increased vitality. This cooperation makes it possible to better integrate French Guiana into its geographical environment, to respond to the concerns of both parties about the various cross-border risks, to encourage human exchanges and trade and to develop the economy of the Amazon region, respecting the local populations and extraordinary environment. The granting to France, on the initiative of Brazil, of observer status within the Amazon Cooperation Treaty Organization, will strengthen this cooperation. The construction of the Oyapock River Bridge over the Oyapock River, decided during President Lula’s visit to France, will make the Cayenne-Macapá road link possible. The bridge was opened in 2017.

== History ==
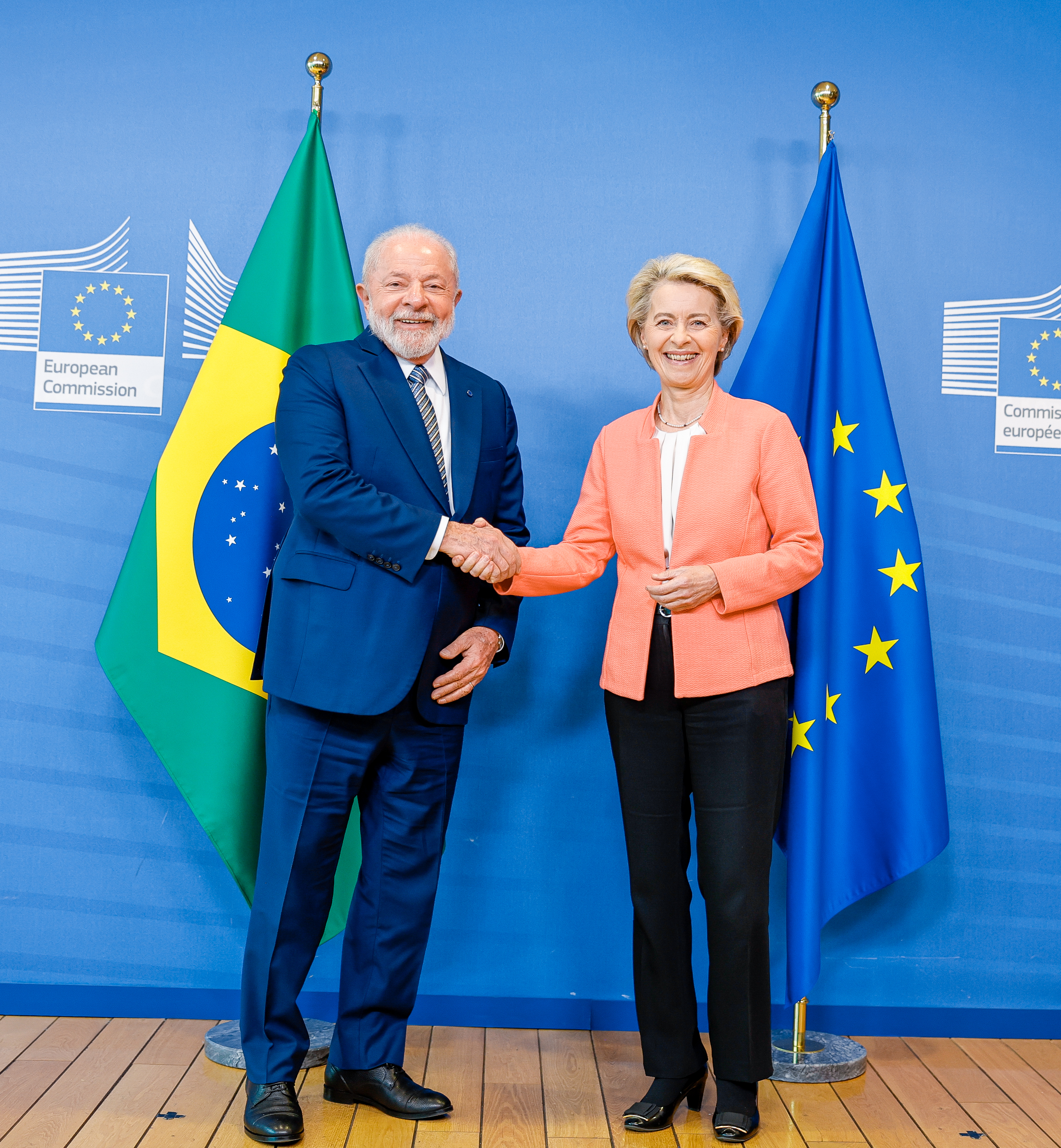
President of Brazil Luiz Inácio Lula da Silva (left) with President of the European Commission Ursula von der Leyen (right)

Since the end of the colonial period, Brazil has to this day retained a heritage of good relations with all European countries. The only novel element in the idea of structuring EU-Brazil relations is therefore the EU itself, which embodies, values and wishes to further develop the systematic and ongoing organization of long-standing cooperation between the two areas. Several initiatives have sought to formalize these close links at all levels, beginning with the Framework Agreement for Cooperation between the European Economic Community and Brazil in 1992.

On July 4, 2007, the European Union, under Portuguese presidency, and Brazil held the 1st EU–Brazil summit. The EU and Brazil exchanged views on a number of bilateral, regional and global issues. They agreed to enhance their longstanding bilateral relationship and in particular to reinforce the political dialogue at the highest political level. At the summit, the EU and Brazil established a comprehensive strategic partnership, based on their close historical, cultural and economic ties.

In 2007, Brazil and the EU established an energy partnership. The agreement aims to develop bilateral cooperation in areas of common interest, most notably in biofuels and other renewable energy sources, low-carbon energy technologies, and the improvement of energy efficiency. It will also help both parties work towards increasing joint international action in the field of energy.

The 2nd EU–Brazil summit was held in Rio de Janeiro on December 22, 2008, chaired by the President of Brazil, Luiz Inácio Lula da Silva, and by the President of the Council of the European Union, Nicolas Sarkozy, the President of the European Commission, José Manuel Durão Barroso, and Javier Solana, High Representative for the Common Foreign and Security Policy. The leaders discussed global issues, regional situations and the strengthening of EU-Brazil relations.

On June 30, 2009, the European Economic and Social Committee and Brazilian Council for Economic and Social Development held the 1st EU-Brazil Civil Society Round Table. The summit discussed the social consequences of the 2008 financial crisis as well as energy resources and climate change.

== Brazil's foreign relations with EU member states ==
- Austria
- Belgium
- Bulgaria
- Croatia
- Cyprus
- Czech Republic
- Denmark
- Estonia
- Finland
- France
- Germany
- Greece
- Hungary
- (Republic of Ireland) Ireland
- Italy
- Latvia
- Lithuania
- Luxembourg
- Malta
- Netherlands
- Poland
- Portugal
- Romania
- Slovakia
- Slovenia
- Spain
- Sweden

== See also ==
- Foreign relations of Brazil
- Foreign relations of the European Union
- Brazilian diaspora
