= Danish immigration to Brazil =

Danish Brazilians
Total population
- 4,814 (Danish citizens as of 2022; not including Brazilians with Danish ancestry)

Regions with significant populations
- South region, Southeast region

Languages
- Danish, Portuguese (Brazilian Portuguese)

Religion
- Christianity

The Danish Brazilians (dinamarqueses brasileiros) are Brazilians of full or partial Danish descent, as well as Danish citizens residing in Brazil. Danish immigration occurred mainly between the late 19th and early 20th centuries, coinciding with broader waves of European migration to South America. Brazil received the second largest number of Danes in Latin America, after Argentina.

== History ==
Danish migration to Brazil intensified after the Second Schleswig War (1864), when Denmark lost territories to Prussia, prompting some Danes to seek opportunities abroad. Between 1864 and the onset of the First World War, it is estimated that around 5,000 Danes entered Brazil, although the movement was largely informal and not always documented by immigration authorities.

== Settlement ==
Most Danish immigrants settled in the South and Southeast regions. In Minas Gerais, Danish settlers contributed to the development of local cheese production in the 19th century, introducing methods similar to those used in Denmark and leading to the creation of a cheese comparable to Danbo.

A smaller Danish colony emerged in the region of São João da Boa Vista and in the city of São Paulo, where individuals of Danish origin became involved in industrial and commercial activities. Among them was businessman Adam von Bülow, founder of the Antarctica company, and later descendants such as Henning Albert Boilesen, a notable industrialist. Danish families also settled in Santa Catarina and Rio Grande do Sul, alongside larger communities of German immigrants.

== Cultural and economic contributions ==
Danish immigrants and their descendants influenced areas such as agriculture, dairy production, and early industrial ventures. The adaptation of Danish cheese-making traditions in Minas Gerais is one of the most distinctive examples of their cultural contribution.

In sports, descendants of Danish immigrants include the Olympic sailing brothers Torben Grael and Lars Grael, who have represented Brazil in several international competitions.

== Notable people ==
- Johan Dalgas Frisch – engineer and ornithologist from São Paulo, son of Danish immigrants.
- Richard Rasmussen – biologist and television presenter with Danish ancestry.

== See also ==
- Brazil–Denmark relations
- European immigration to Brazil
- German Brazilians
- Nordic Brazilians
