= Queijo prato =

Brazilian cheese

- Country of origin: Brazil
- Source of milk: Cows
- Pasteurised: Yes
- Texture: Semi-hard
- Aging time: At least 25 days

Queijo prato (Portuguese pronunciation: [ˈkejʒu ˈpɾatu], literally "plate-shaped cheese"), named after the shape it was originally made in by Danish immigrants, is a Brazilian semi-hard cheese, similar to Danbo. It is one of the most popular Brazilian cheeses.

In the 1920s, Danish immigrants in rural parts of Aiuruoca, Minas Gerais, laid the foundation for the production of queijo prato. They initially attempted to reproduce Danbo but had to make adaptations to suit local conditions; over the years the original recipe was modified: the original Queijo Prato had eyes (similar to some Swiss cheeses), but since its mostly sold in slices, the production methods were changed to remove the eyes in order to ease slicing.

It is characterized by low salt and lactose content, yellow color and mild flavor. Its usually paired with fruits and cold cuts, or used in sandwiches, pizzas, pies, omelettes, pastas, and several other dishes.

== See also ==
- List of cheeses
