= Austrian Brazilians =

Austrian Brazilians Austro-brasileiro
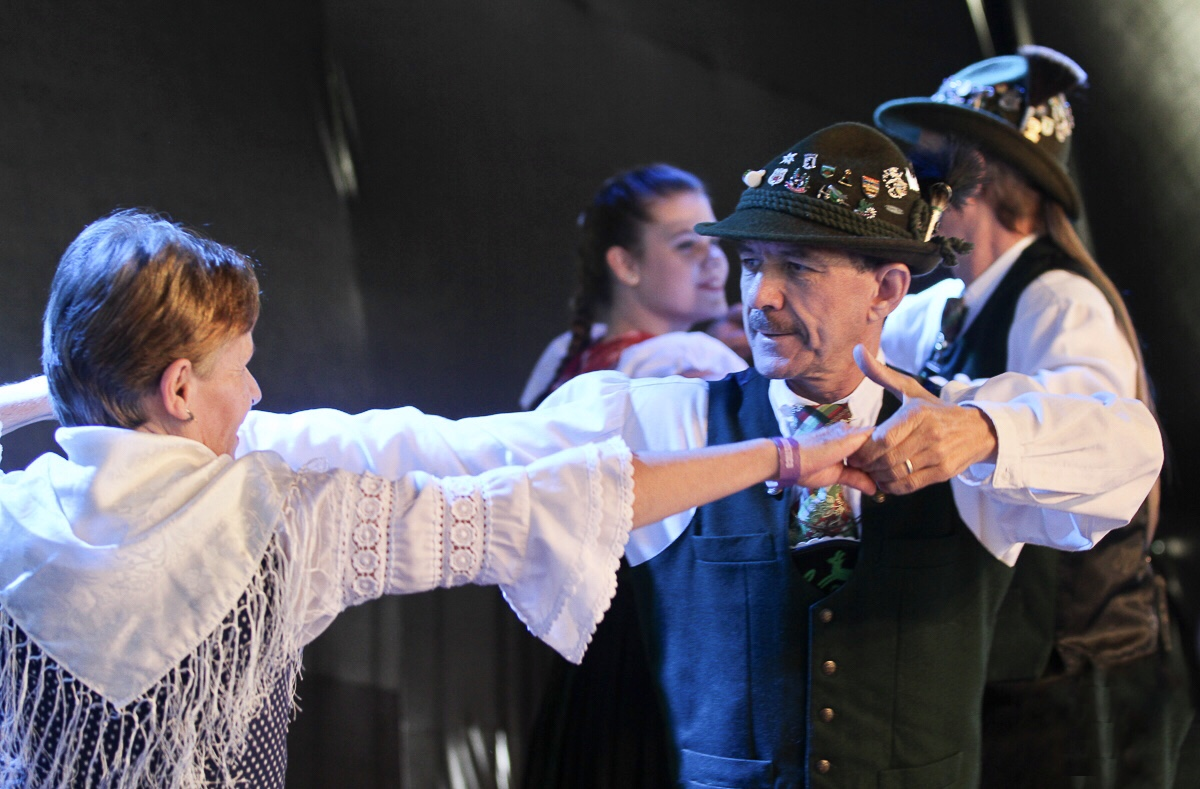
- Austrian descendants in São Paulo.

Total population
- 100,000

Regions with significant populations
- Mainly Santa Catarina, São Paulo and Minas Gerais.

Languages
- Predominantly Portuguese; Austro-Bavarian, German, Yiddish

Religion
- Christianity (Mainly Roman Catholicism), Protestantism, Judaism and others

Related ethnic groups
- Other White Brazilians, especially German Brazilians

Austrian Brazilians (Portuguese: Austro-brasileiro, Austríaco brasileiro) refers to Brazilians of full, partial, or predominantly Austrian ancestry, or Austrian-born people residing in Brazil. Brazil is home to the second largest German-Austrian population outside their respective nations, after the United States. German is the second most spoken language in the country. The author Stefan Zweig who wrote about Brazil, and the Habsburg-Lorraine Maria Leopoldina of Austria, Empress consort of Brazil, are among the most prominent Austrians to settle in Brazil.

== History ==
Some Austrian Jews fled to Brazil to flee Nazism.

== See also ==
- Austria–Brazil relations
- Immigration to Brazil
- White Brazilians
- Austrian people
- German Brazilian
- Swiss Brazilians
- History of the Jews in Brazil
