= Austria–Brazil relations =

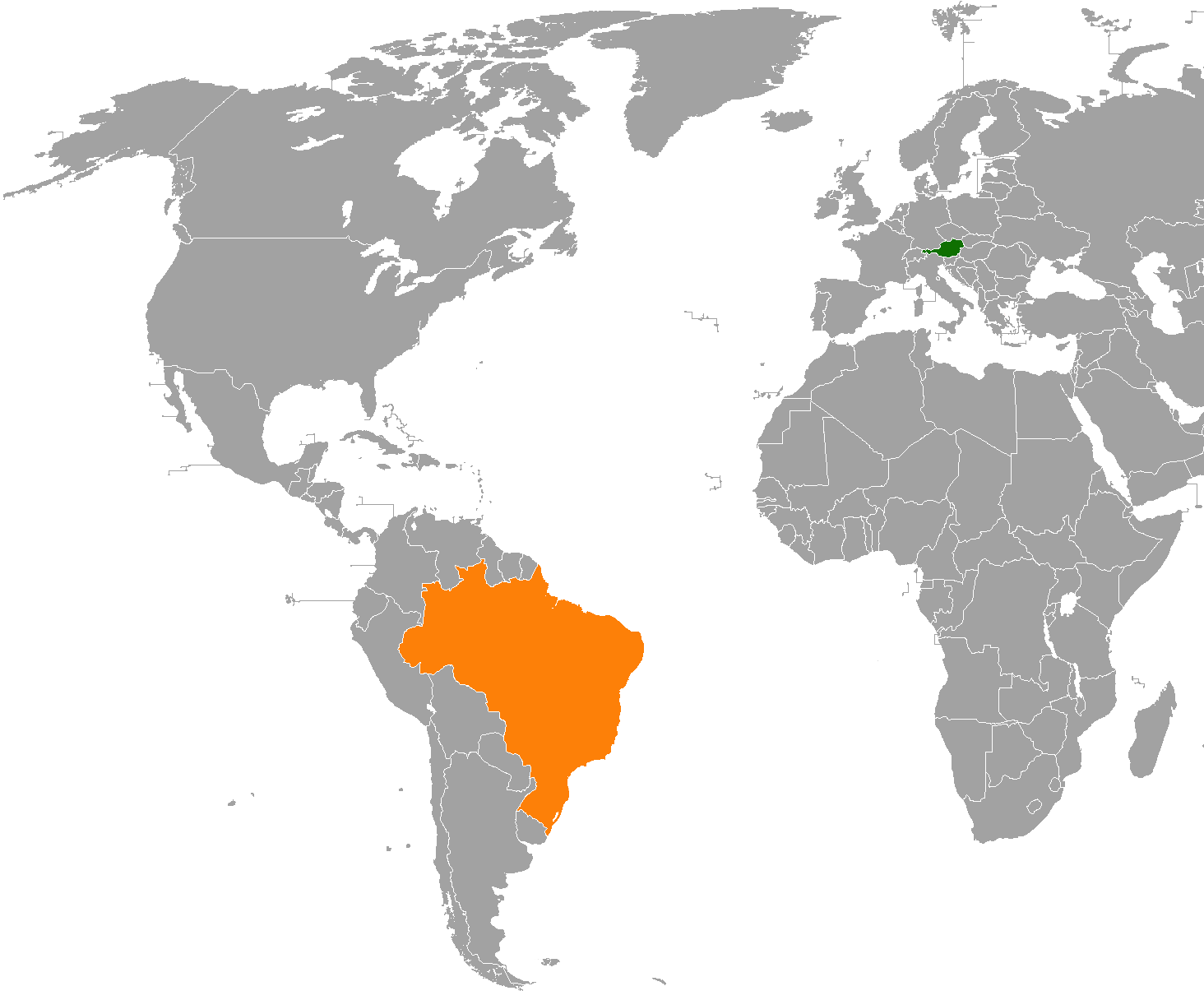
- Austria: Brazil

Diplomatic relations exist between the Republic of Austria and the Federative Republic of Brazil. Both nations are members of the United Nations.

== History ==
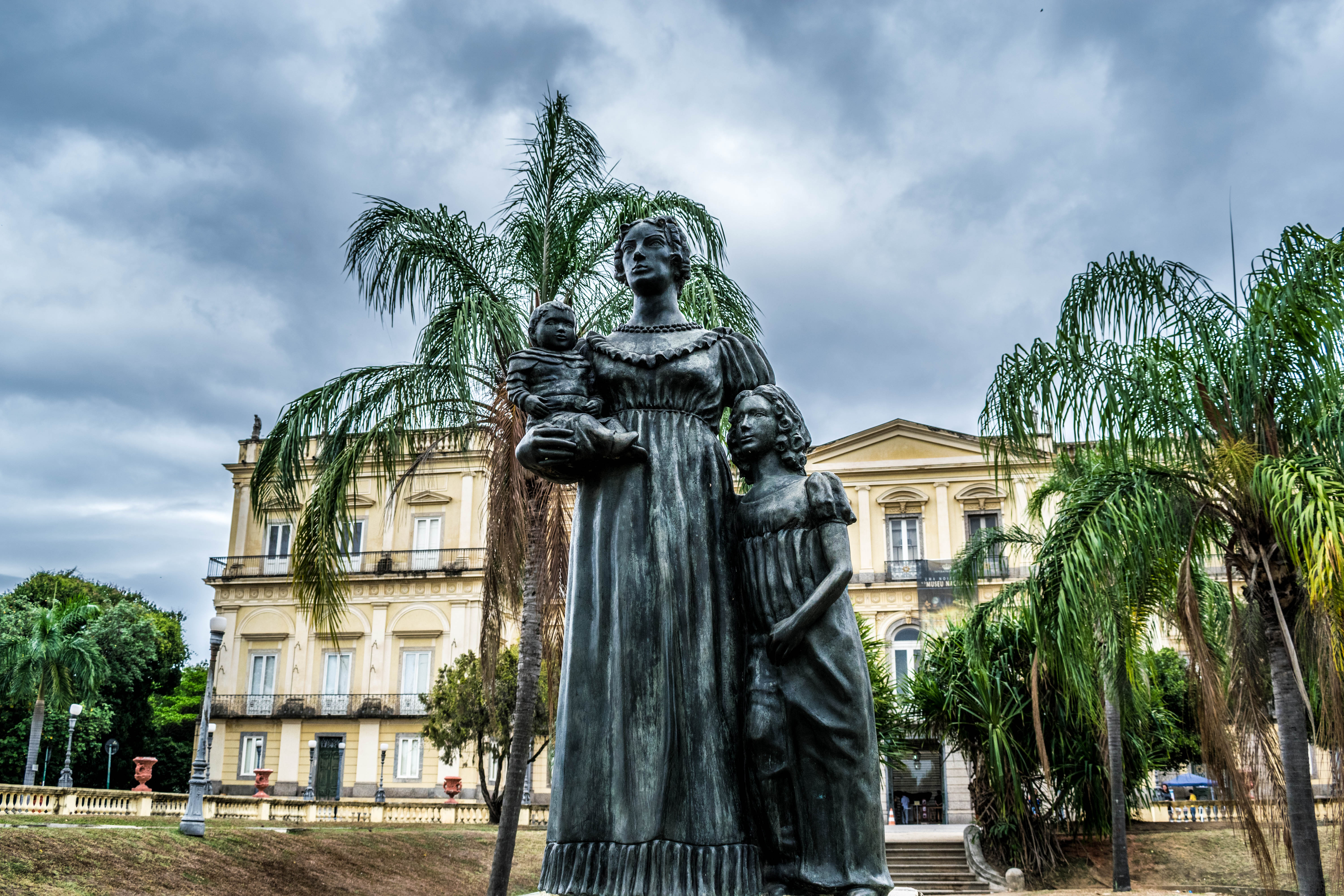
Statue of Maria Leopoldina of Austria in Rio de Janeiro

The first official contact between Austria and Brazil occurred in November 1817 when Austrian Archduchess Maria Leopoldina of Austria arrived to Rio de Janeiro to marry Crown Prince (and future Emperor) Pedro I of Brazil. Maria Leopoldina became Empress of Brazil in 1822 and is also the mother of Emperor Pedro II of Brazil. In 1825, Austria recognized the independence of Brazil from its separation from Portugal. In 1859, the first Austrian immigrants began arriving to Brazil.

In 1871, Emperor Pedro II paid a visit to Austria during his first European tours and met with his cousin Emperor Franz Joseph I of Austria. While in Vienna, Pedro II paid his respects to the tomb of his daughter, Princess Leopoldina of Brazil, who died in Vienna earlier that year. Pedro II would return to Austria for second time in 1877.

In 1891, Austria recognized the Republic of Brazil, two years after the abdication of Emperor Pedro II. In 1925, Austria opened a consulate in Rio de Janeiro. While Austria & Brazil were technically on the enemy sides in WW1, Brazil wasn't really hostile to Austria and only declared war on Germany in October 1917. During World War II, Brazilian Expeditionary Forces fought in Italy against German troops (which also included Austrian soldiers) during the Italian campaign. After the war, Austria and Brazil re-established diplomatic relations.

In December 1952, Brazil presented a preliminary draft resolution at the United Nations General Assembly to restore the full sovereignty of Austria. The preliminary draft was accepted with 48 votes. The initiative did not have immediate direct effects, however, it contributed to that, in a difficult time, the discussion about an Austrian State treaty remained on the international agenda. In 1992, Austrian Chancellor Franz Vranitzky paid a visit to Brazil. In March 1997, on the occasion of the bicentenary of the birth of Maria Leopoldina of Austria, a monument of her was inaugurated in Parque Quinta da Boa Vista, in front of the National Museum of Brazil, in Rio de Janeiro. In 2006, Brazilian President Luiz Inácio Lula da Silva paid a visit to Austria, the first by a Brazilian President. There have been numerous visits between leaders of both nations.

In 2019, there was a community of 10,000 Austrians living in Brazil. In 2015, there was a community of 4,900 Brazilians living in Austria.

== High-level visits ==
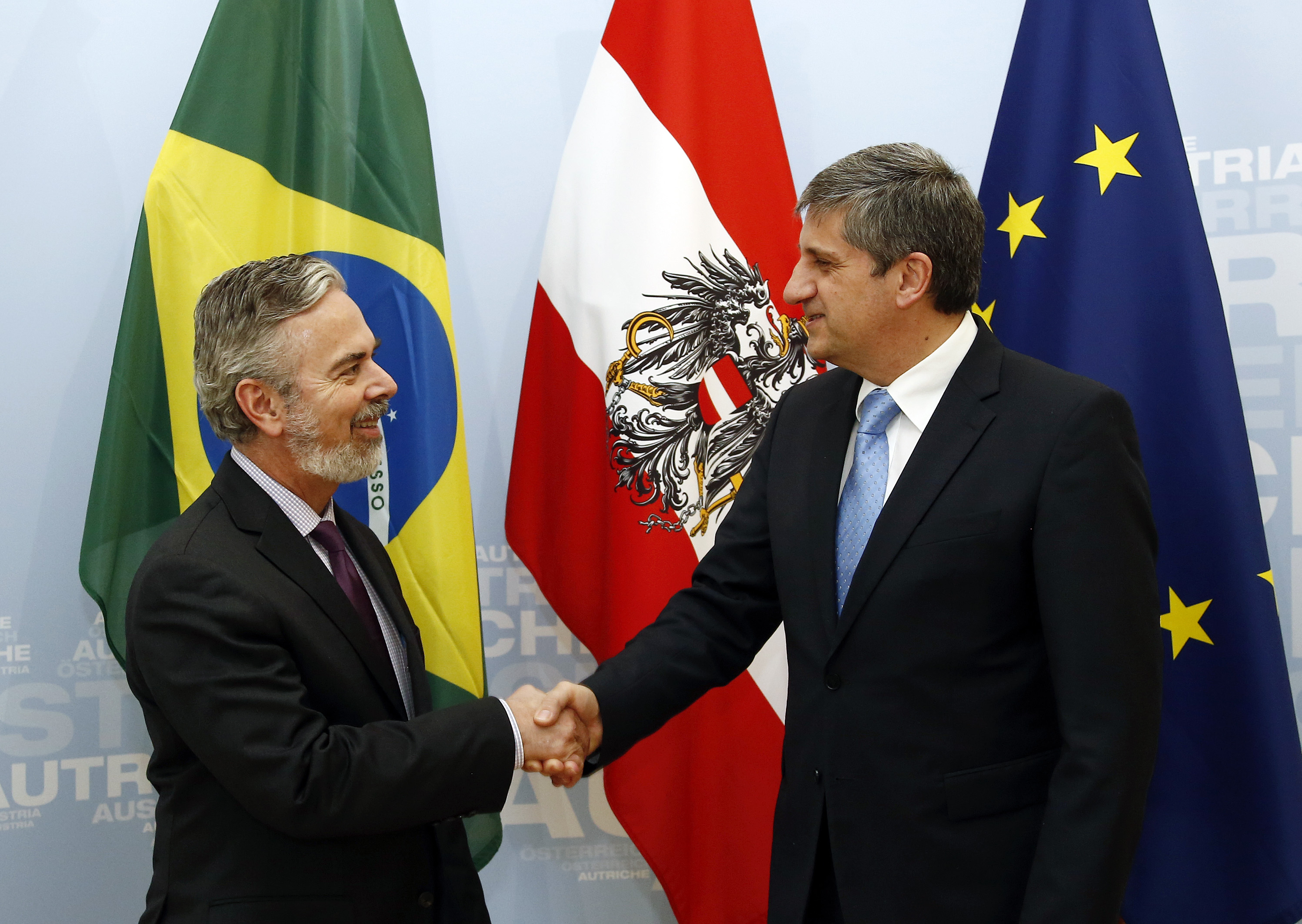
Brazilian Foreign Minister Antonio Patriota meeting with Austrian Vice-Chancellor Michael Spindelegger in Vienna, February 2013.

High-level visits from Austria to Brazil

- Foreign Minister Karl Gruber (1952)
- Vice-Chancellor Bruno Pittermann (1960)
- Foreign Minister Willibald Pahr (1980)
- Foreign Secretary General Thomas Klestil (1991)
- Chancellor Franz Vranitzky (1992)
- Foreign Secretary General Wolfgang Schallenberg (1993)
- Chancellor Viktor Klima (1999)
- President Heinz Fischer (2005)
- Chancellor Alfred Gusenbauer (2008)
- Foreign Minister Michael Spindelegger (2010)
- Foreign Secretary General Johannes Kyrle (2011)

High-level visits from Brazil to Austria

- Emperor Pedro II of Brazil (1871 and 1877)
- Foreign Minister Ramiro Saraiva Guerreiro (1982)
- Foreign Minister Roberto Costa de Abreu Sodré (1989)
- President Luiz Inácio Lula da Silva (2006)
- Foreign Secretary General Ruy Nunes Pinto Nogueira (2012)
- Foreign Minister Antonio Patriota (2013)

== Agreements ==
Both nations have signed several agreements such as an Agreement of Commerce and Navigation (1826); Agreement to avoid double taxation in respect of taxes on income and capital (1976); Agreement on Economic and Industrial Cooperation (1986); Air Services Agreement (1995); Protocol of Intent on Technical Cooperation (2005); Protocol of Intent between the Rio Branco Institute and the Diplomatic Academy of Vienna (2005); Memorandum of Understanding on the Establishment of a Political Consultation Mechanism (2008) and an Agreement on Scientific and Technological Cooperation (2019).

== Trade ==
In 2018, trade between both nations totaled €1.3 billion Euros. Austria's main exports to Brazil include: electronics, pharmaceuticals, paper, rails and chemicals. Brazil's main exports to Austria include: raw materials, aircraft, food products and beverages. Approximately 200 Austrian companies have branches in Brazil, of which more than half work in the State of São Paulo.

== Resident diplomatic missions ==
Of Austria

- Brasília (Embassy)
- São Paulo (Consulate-General)

Of Brazil

- Vienna (Embassy)

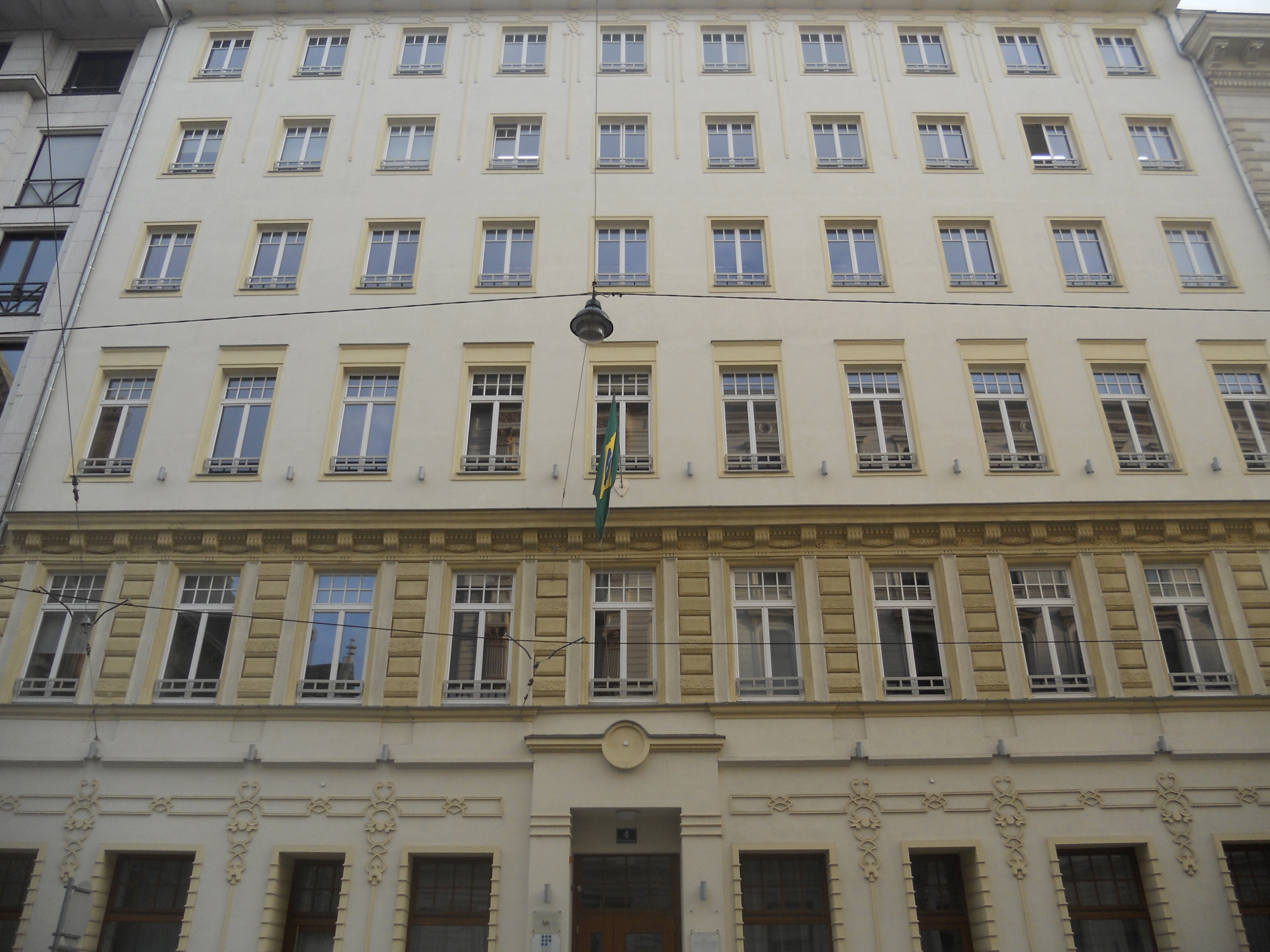
Embassy of Brazil in Vienna

== See also ==
- Foreign relations of Austria
- Foreign relations of Brazil
- Austrian Brazilians
- Brazilians in Austria
- Treze Tílias
- Brazil–EU relations
