= Brazil–Norway relations =

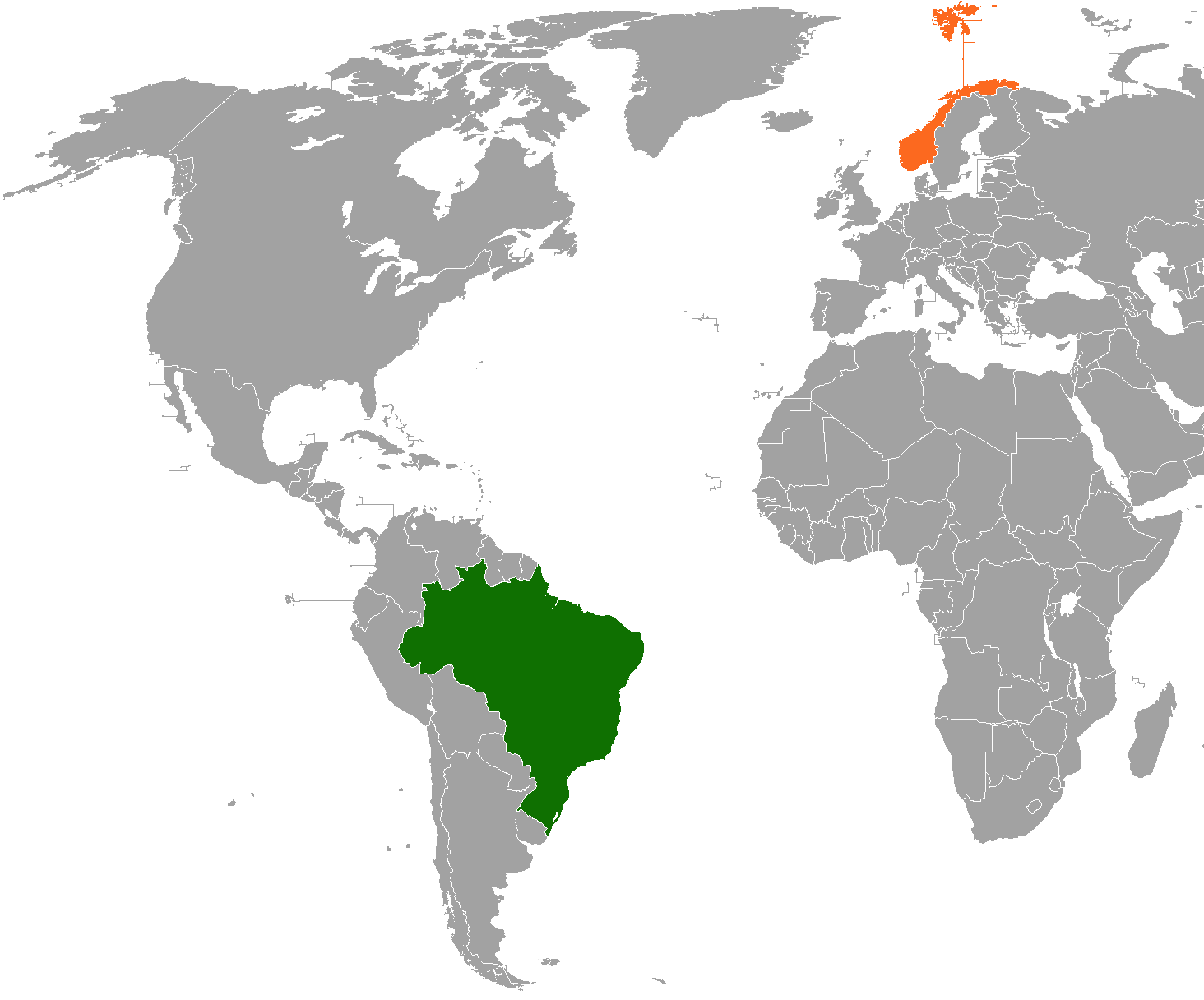
- Brazil: Norway

Brazil–Norway relations are the diplomatic relations between the Federative Republic of Brazil and the Kingdom of Norway. Both nations are members of the United Nations.

== History ==
Beginning in the 19th century, Norwegian migrants began settling in Brazil. In 1851, Norwegian migrants were one of the founding members of the city of Joinville in Santa Catarina State. In 1905, Brazil was one of the first countries to recognize Norway's independence after the Dissolution of the union between Norway and Sweden. Since then, relations between Brazil and Norway have become cordial, based on shared values and guided by mutual respect.

Norway is the one country that has played against Brazil and never lost, 2 times in the World Cup.

In 1967, King Olav V of Norway paid an official visit to Brazil. In 1991, President Fernando Collor de Mello became the first Brazilian head-of-state to visit Norway. Since the initial visits, there have been numerous visits and reunions between leaders of both nations. In recent years, contacts between governments, companies and individuals from both countries have intensified, giving dynamism to the bilateral relationship. Brazil is one of the largest markets for the Norwegian shipping and supply industries, and Norway and Brazil cooperate closely on maritime issues.

During the 2019 Amazon rainforest wildfires, Norway suspended payments to the Brazilian government's Amazon Fund (a mechanism created to protect the Brazilian Amazon rainforest) after a surge in deforestation. Norway has been the fund's biggest donor, and has given approximately US$1.2 billion over the past decade. The Norwegian Government voiced concerns about the rate of deforestation since President Jair Bolsonaro took power in Brazil.

== High-level visits ==
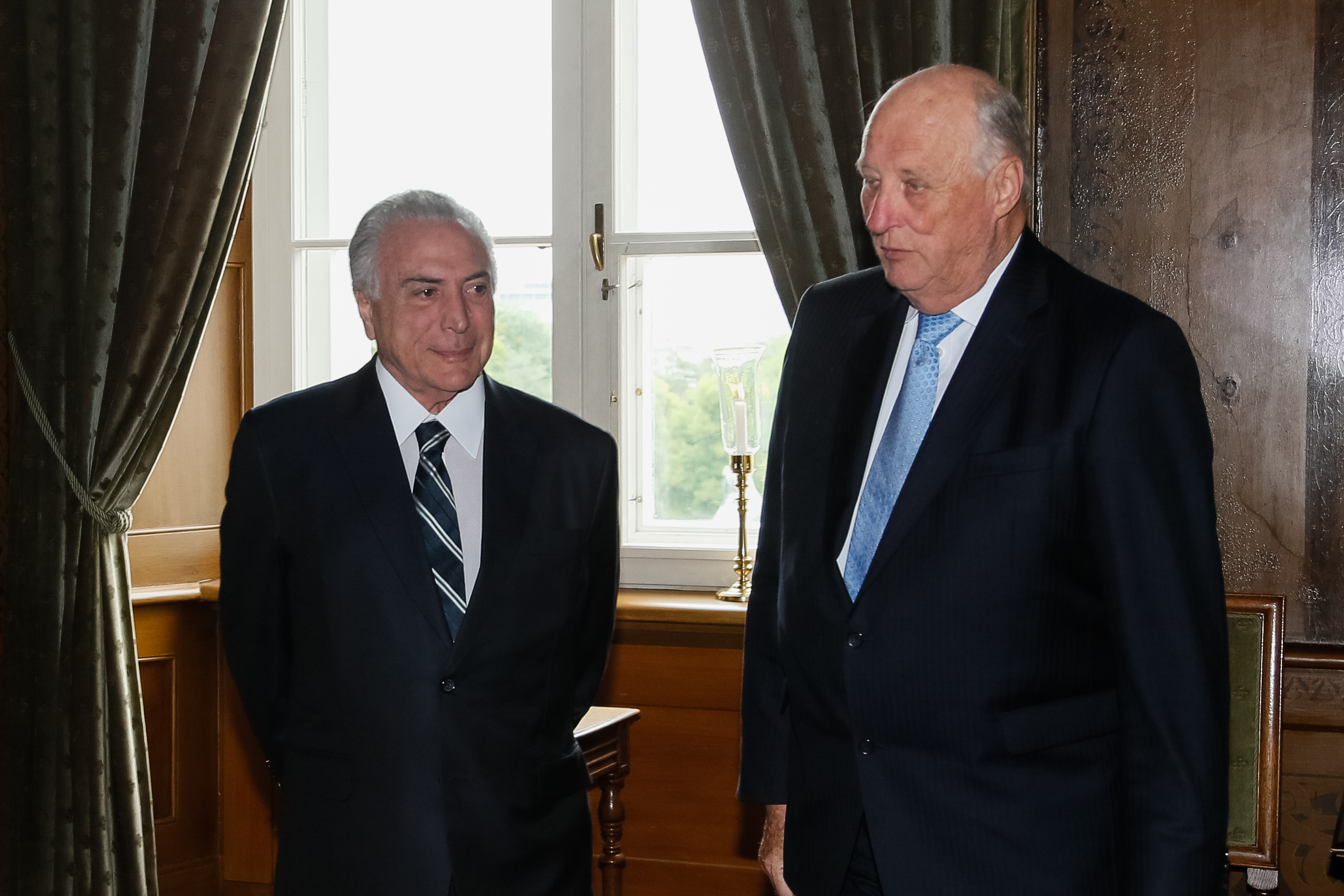
Brazilian President Michel Temer and King Harald V of Norway in Oslo; 2017.

High-level visits from Brazil to Norway

- President Fernando Collor de Mello (1991)
- Vice President Marco Maciel (2002)
- President Luiz Inácio Lula da Silva (2007)
- Foreign Minister Antonio Patriota (2013)
- President Michel Temer (2017)

High-level visits from Norway to Brazil

- King Olav V of Norway (1967)
- Prime Minister Gro Harlem Brundtland (1992)
- Prime Minister Kjell Magne Bondevik (1998, 2003)
- King Harald V of Norway (2003)
- Prime Minister Jens Stoltenberg (2008, 2012)
- Foreign Minister Jonas Gahr Støre (2011)
- Foreign Minister Børge Brende (2014)
- Crown Prince Haakon (2015)

== Bilateral agreements ==
Both nations have signed a few agreements such an Agreement on Trade and Economic, Industrial and Technical Cooperation (1978); Agreement on the Avoidance of Double Taxation (1980) and a Memorandum of Understanding on Technical, Hygienic and Sanitary provisions governing bilateral trade in Fishery and Aquaculture products and byproducts (2003).

== Resident diplomatic missions ==
Of Brazil

- Oslo (Embassy)

Of Norway

- Brasília (Embassy)
- Rio de Janeiro (Consulate-General)

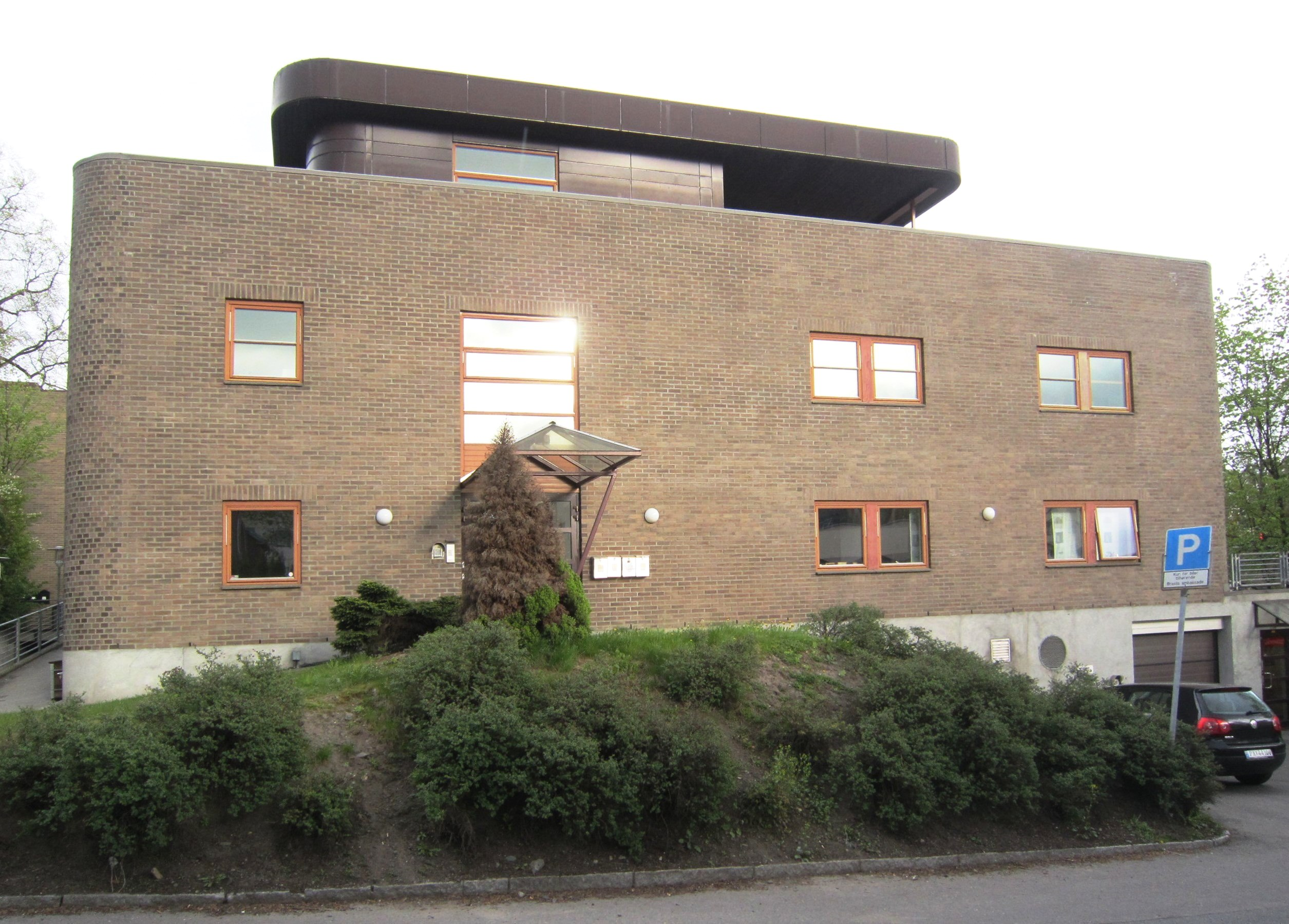
Embassy of Brazil in Oslo

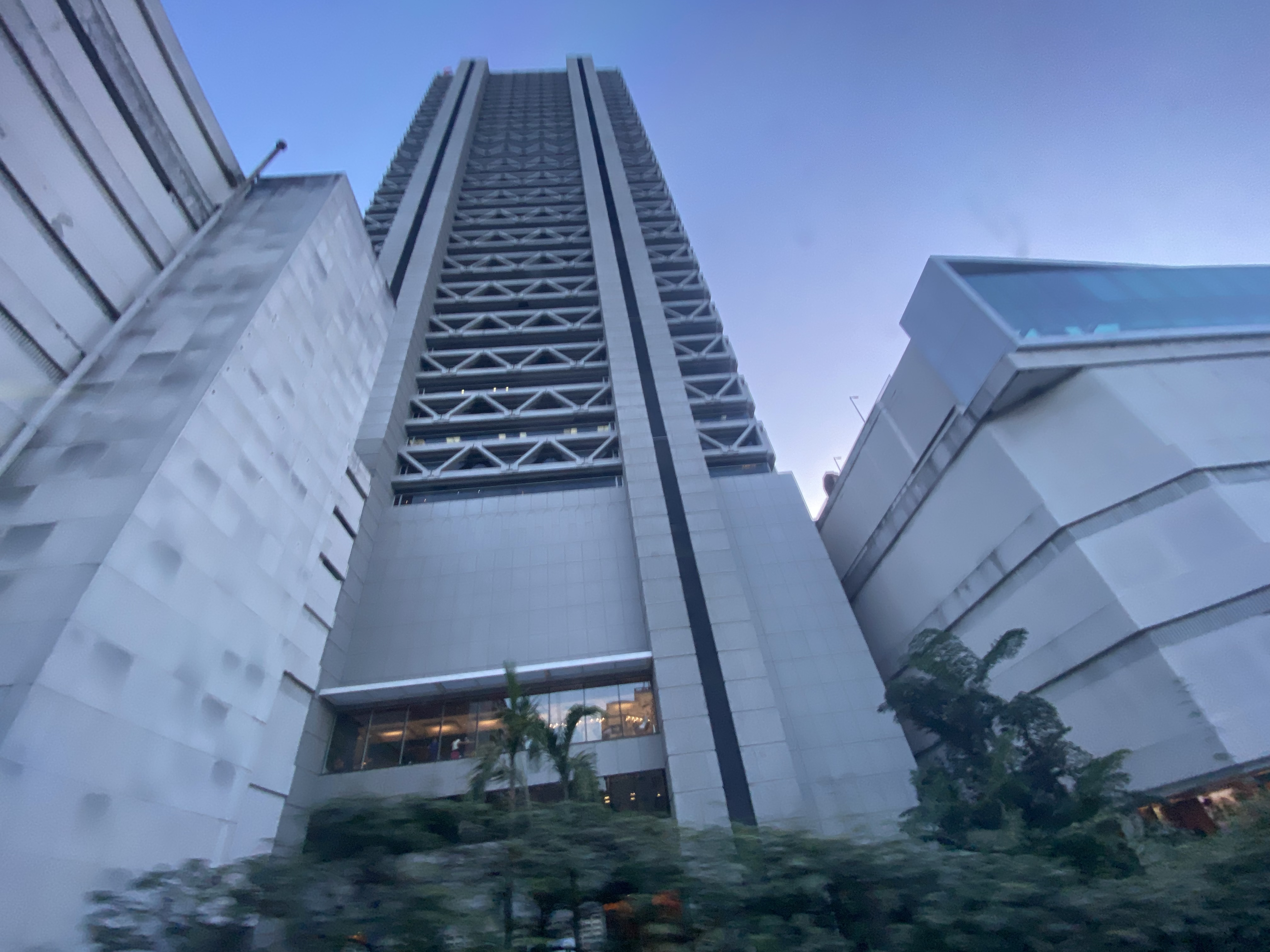
Torre Rio Sul hosting the Consulate-General of Norway in Rio de Janeiro

== See also ==
- Norwegians
- Scandinavian Brazilians
