= 1st EU–Brazil summit =

2007 international summit

The first summit meeting between the European Union (EU) and Brazil took place in Lisbon on 4 July 2007. At the summit, Brazil was granted special partnership status with the EU.

A second EU–Brazil summit was held in Rio de Janeiro on December 22, 2008.

== Leaders at the summit ==
- Portugal and European Union
  - Prime Minister of Portugal and President-in-office of the Council of the European Union José Sócrates
- Brazil
  - President of Brazil Luiz Inácio Lula da Silva
- European Union
  - President of the European Commission José Manuel Barroso

=== Participants at the dinner ===
- Portugal
  - Prime Minister José Sócrates
- Portugal
  - President Aníbal Cavaco Silva
- Brazil
  - President Luiz Inácio Lula da Silva
- European Union
  - President of the European Commission José Manuel Barroso
- France
  - President Nicolas Sarkozy
- Spain
  - Prime Minister José Luis Rodríguez Zapatero
- Italy
  - Prime Minister Romano Prodi
- Slovenia
  - Prime Minister Janez Janša

== Location ==
This summit took place in Lisbon, at the Pavilhão Atlântico. The dinner was offered by the Portuguese President Aníbal Cavaco Silva, at Belém Cultural Center.

== Discussions ==
The summit aimed to establish closer relations between the European Union and Brazil. Portugal formally invited its former colony, Brazil, to be a strategic partner of the EU, along with India, Russia and China, meaning that all the BRIC countries now had special partnership status.

Issues concerned with a proposed trade agreement between the EU and the Mercosur group of South American countries including Brazil were also discussed.

Associated with the summit, the oil and energy corporations Galp Energia of Portugal and Petrobras of Brazil signed an agreement on production of vegetable oils in Brazil.

== See also ==
- Brazil–European Union relations
