= Aiuruoca =

Town and municipality in the state of Minas Gerais, Brazil

Coordinates: 21°58′S 44°36′W

- Municipality
- Municipality of Aiuruoca
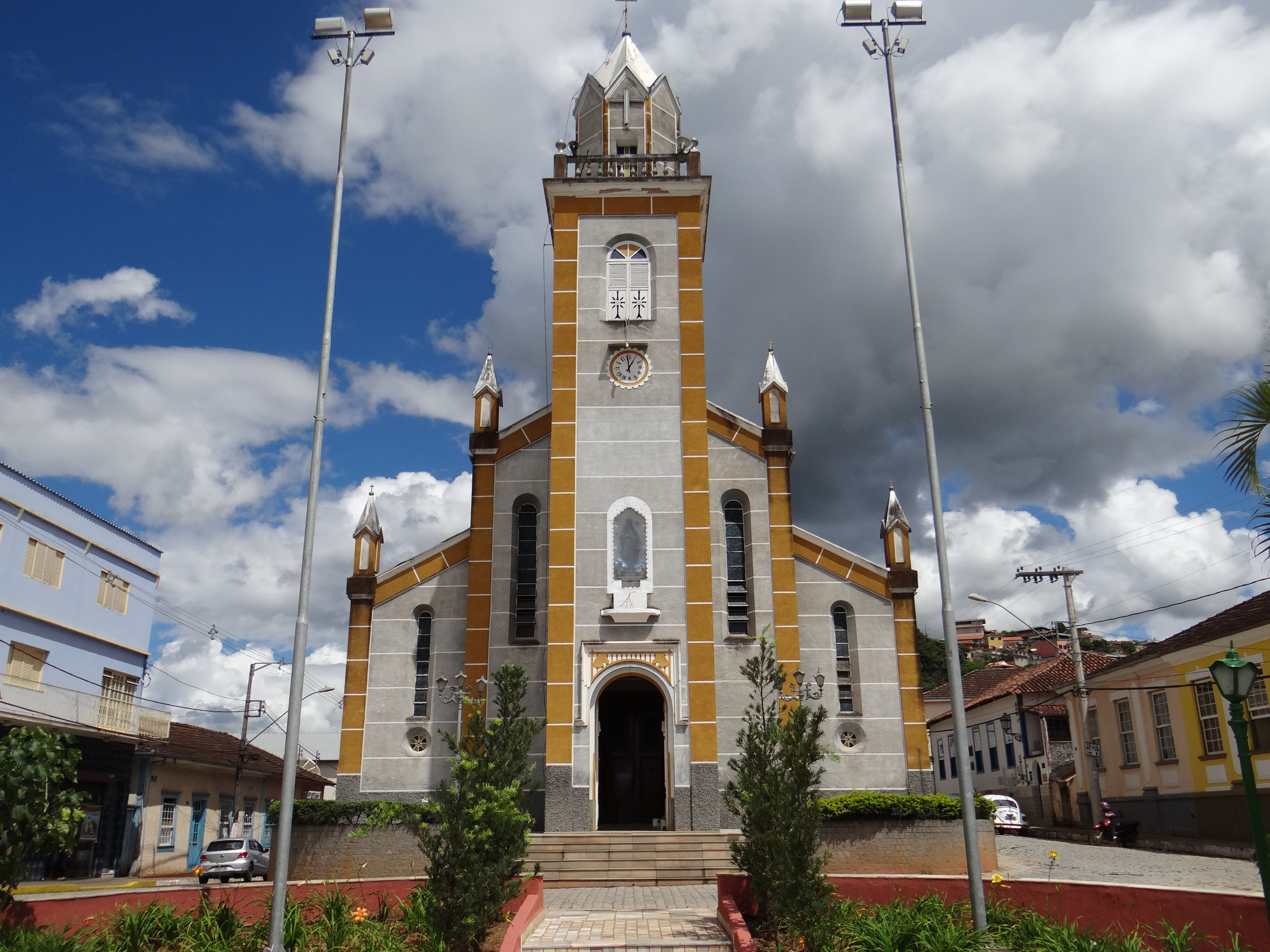

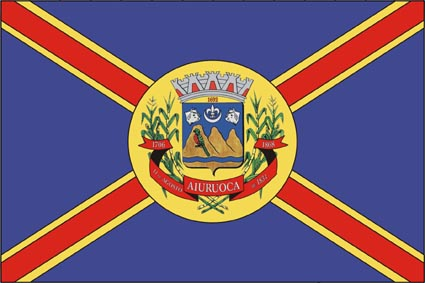
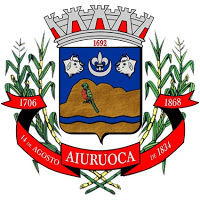
- Flag Coat of arms

- Location in Minas Gerais
- Country: Brazil
- State: Minas Gerais
- Region: Southeast
- Intermediate Region: Pouso Alegre
- Immediate Region: Caxambu-Baependi
- Founded: 1706

Government
  - Mayor: Erlisson Vitor Lopes (PSD)

Area
  - Total: 649.680 km^{2} (250.843 sq mi)

Population (2021)
  - Total: 5,949
  - Density: 9.157/km^{2} (23.72/sq mi)
- Demonym: aiuruocano
- Time zone: UTC−3 (BRT)
- Postal Code: 37450-000 to 37451-999
- HDI (2010): 0.668 – medium
- Website: aiuruoca.mg.gov.br

Aiuruoca is a city in the Brazilian state of Minas Gerais. In 2020 its population was estimated to be 5,976.

Aiuruoca was founded in 1706.

In the 1920s, Danish immigrants in rural parts of Aiuruoca laid the foundation for the production of the Brazilian cheese queijo prato.

The municipality contains 15.76% of the 22,917 hectares (56,630 acres) Serra do Papagaio State Park, created in 1998.
