= Nordic Brazilians =

Nordic people in Brazil

Total population
- 52,000 (Danes) 3,190 (Finns) 1,046 (Icelanders) 10,618 (Norwegians) 23,048 (Swedes) 89,902 (Scandinavians) in Brazil (2020)

Regions with significant populations
- Rio de Janeiro, Natal, Curitiba, São Paulo, Ceará

Languages
- Portuguese, Scandinavian languages, Finnish

Religion
- Protestantism (especially Lutheranism), Catholicism

Related ethnic groups
- Other Brazilians, Danes, Finns, Norwegians, Swedes, Icelanders, Faroe Islanders

Nordic Brazilians refers to Brazilians of full or partial Nordic ancestry, or Nordic-born people residing in Brazil.

The Nordic settlement in Brazil began in the mid to late 19th century and was predominant when around 3,640 Nordic peoples arrived in Brazil, mainly from Sweden. Many Nordic people came to Brazil for economic reasons and to start a new life.

In recent years, a few Norwegians and Swedes have migrated to the littoral zone of the State of Rio Grande do Norte (mainly Natal) and Ceará, attracted by the beaches and the tropical climate.

== History ==
Daniel Solander became the first Swedish person to ever visit Brazil when he came to the country in 1768.

Mass emigration from Norway started circa 1865–1866, after the civil war was over. Several ship-owners saw the opportunity to earn good money by transporting migrants to the New World. United States, Canada and Brazil received many Norwegians.

Examples of this immigration are the Karlson House (Casa Sueca) in Guarani das Missões, the Svenska Kulturhuset in the district of Linha Jansen (Farroupilha, RS), the Mission of Örebro in Venancio Aires, RS. Swedish cultural groups include the Ovenska Danser ballet of Ijuí, RS and the Ballet Patrícia Johnson of Bento Gonçalves, RS.

In April 2010, the City of Nova Roma, RS celebrated the 120th anniversary of the Swedish immigration to the city. Earlier, in 1991, the city of Ijui, RS celebrated the immigration of the Scandinavians to their city (mainly Swedes) with the opening of a Swedish Cultural Center in the city.

There was also significant immigration of Swedish and Danish citizens to São João da Boa Vista, in the state of São Paulo.

In the 1920s, Danish immigrants in rural parts of Aiuruoca laid the foundation for the modern Brazilian cheese production.

== Religion and culture ==
The Scandinavian Church in Brazil is a part of The Swedish Church Abroad (SKUT) – which belongs to the Church of Sweden. They offer services for Scandinavians or persons with Scandinavian related interests. They have churches in Rio de Janeiro and São Paulo. Also, over time, many of the Scandinavians have converted to Catholicism, or more recently, other forms of Protestantism.

== Notable Nordic Brazilians ==
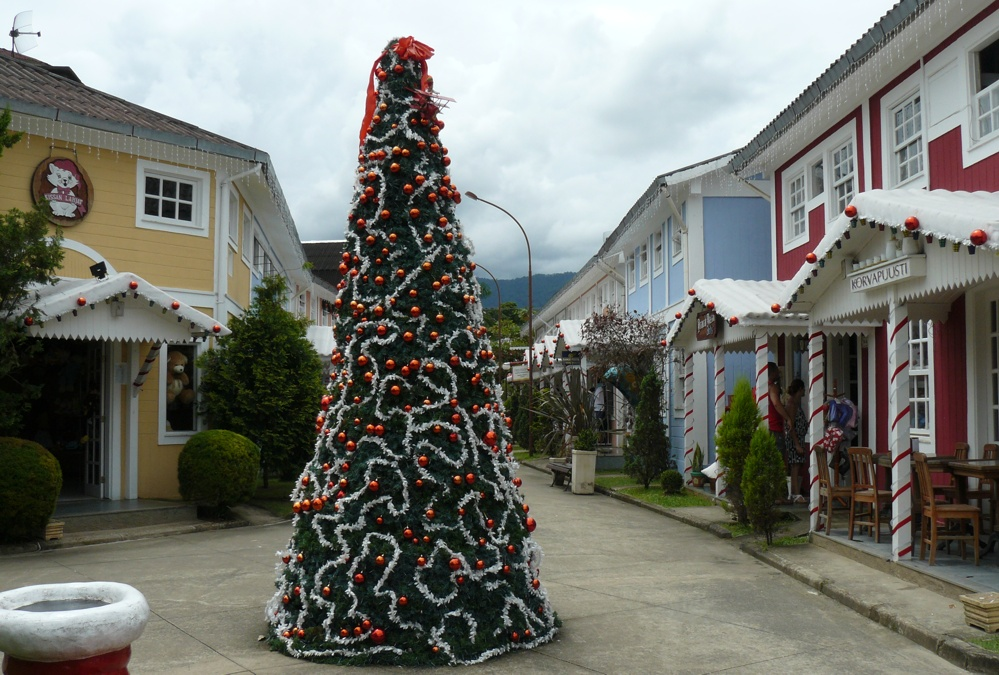
Itatiaia had Finnish colonization.

- Robert Scheidt, professional sailor
- Marcos S. Olsen, admiral of the Brazilian Navy

=== Danish ===
- Peter Wilhelm Lund, palaeontologist and zoologist
- Rinaldo de Lamare, pediatric physician
- Torben Grael, professional sailor
- Lars Grael, politician and former professional sailor
- Erik Bagger, goldsmith

=== Norwegian ===
- Erling Lorentzen, industrialist
- Princess Ragnhild of Norway
- Jonathan Haagensen, actor
- Phellipe Haagensen, actor
- Lucas Pinheiro Braathen, professional alpine skier
- Marcos Olsen, former sports shooter

=== Swedish ===
- Bob Burnquist, professional skateboarder
- Augusto Bruno Nielson and Eugênio Nielson, founders of the "Nielson Bus" bodies in Brazil (Busscar)
- Erik Jansson, religious leader
- Amyr Klink, explorer and sailor
- Lars Sigurd Björkström, professional sailor
- Manuel Bergström Lourenço Filho, educator
- Peter Dolving, musician and songwriter

== See also ==
- Brazil–Denmark relations
- Brazil–Finland relations
- Brazil–Norway relations
- Brazil–Sweden relations
- Immigration to Brazil
- Danish immigration to Brazil
- Danish diaspora
- Finnish diaspora
- Icelandic diaspora
- Norwegian diaspora
- Swedish diaspora
- White Brazilians
