= Danbo =

Danish semi-soft cheese

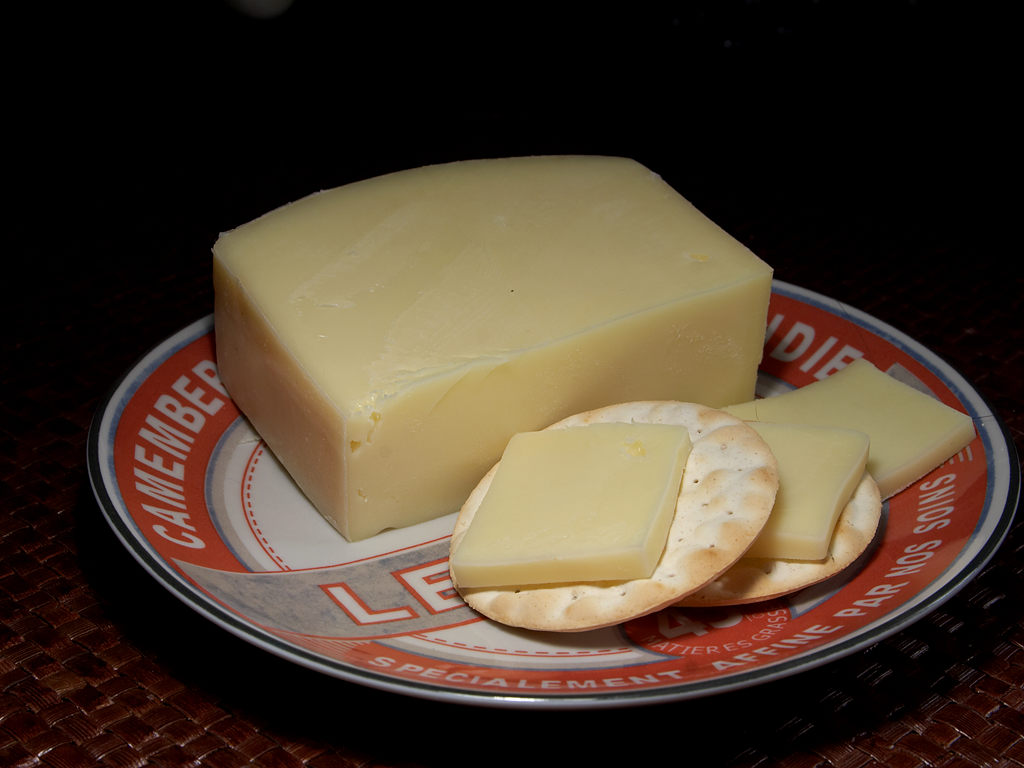
- Country of origin: Denmark
- Source of milk: Cows
- Texture: Semi-soft
- Fat content: 15–45%
- Dimensions: rectangular
- Weight: 6–9 kg
- Aging time: 1.5–5 months

Danbo is a semi-soft, aged cow's milk cheese from Denmark. It was awarded PGI status under European Union law in 2017.

The cheese is typically aged between 12 and 52 weeks in rectangular blocks of 6 or 9 kg (13 or 20 lb), coated with a bacterial culture. The culture is washed off at the end of the aging cycle, and the cheese is packaged for retail sales.

== Types ==
Danbo is generally categorized for sale according to aging time, with typical variants including mild, medium aged, aged and extra aged cheeses. These are sold under various trade and brand names, including the mild Lillebror, the extra aged Gamle Ole, and Riberhus by Arla Foods. "Lillebror" (translated from Danish meaning "little brother") is extremely mild and considered a cheese for children and those sensitive to a matured cheese taste. Gamle Ole (translated from Danish meaning "Old Ole", a man's name) is matured for a long time giving it a strong or sharp flavor, which can be considered pungent. "Gamle Ole" is traditionally paired with some rings of raw onion and a slice of meat aspic on a slice of bread for an open face sandwich.

Caraway seeds (kommen) are added to the cheese in a traditional variant.

== History ==
In the first decades of the 20th century, Danish immigrants, established in the south part of Minas Gerais State in Brazil, discovered a new kind of cheese, after making the traditional Danbo Cheese with Brazilian milk. This cheese is called queijo prato.

== See also ==
- List of cheeses
