= Brazil–Sweden relations =

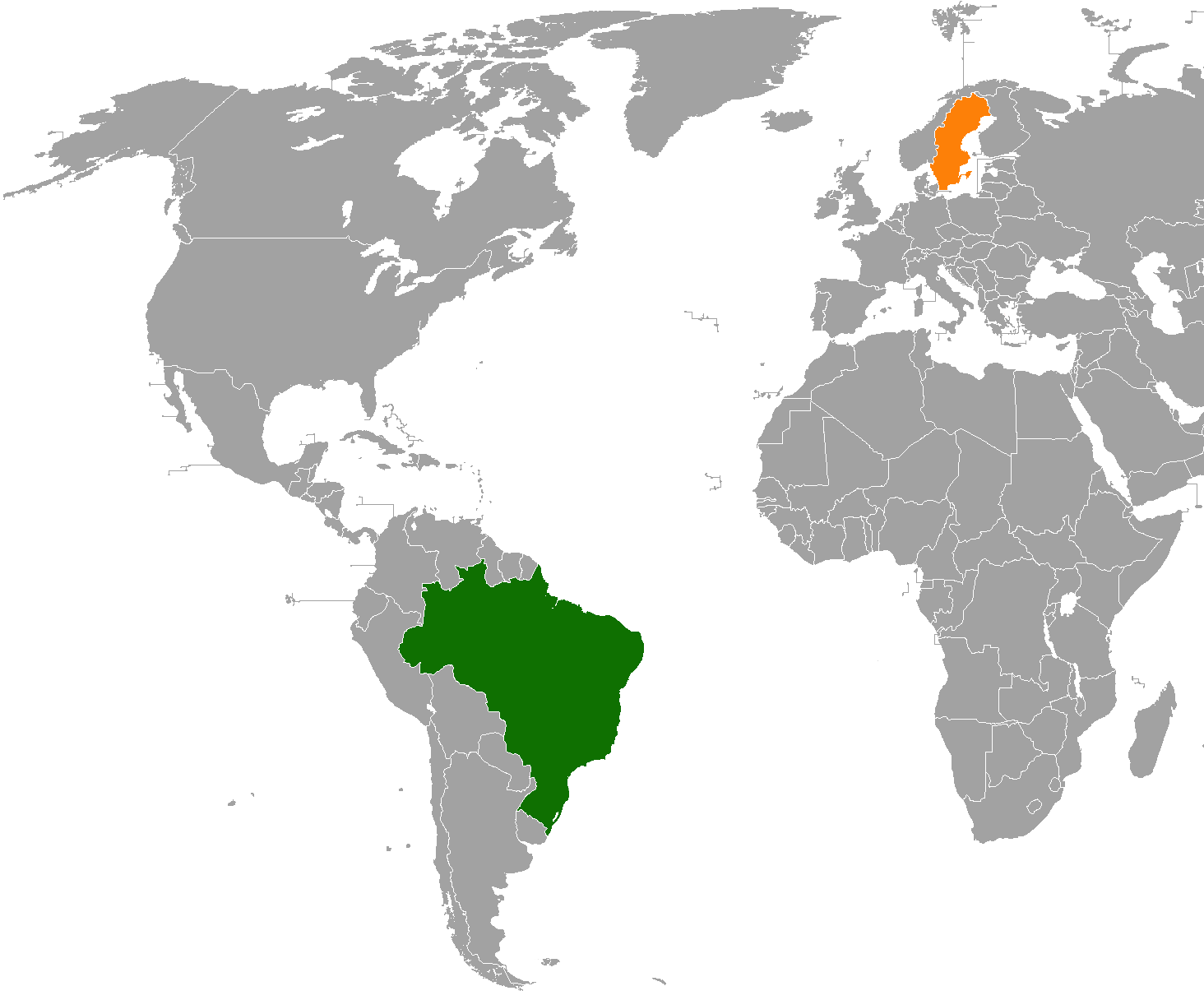
- Brazil: Sweden

Brazil–Sweden relations are the diplomatic relations between Brazil and Sweden. Both nations are members of the United Nations.

== History ==
In 1826, Brazil and Sweden established diplomatic relations. In 1876, during his second tour of Europe, Emperor Pedro II of Brazil paid a visit to Sweden to visit with his cousin King Oscar II of Sweden. In 1890, the first Swedish migrants arrived to Brazil. In 1891, the Swedish multinational company Ericsson installed the first telephone in Brazil at the home of Emperor Pedro II in Rio de Janeiro.

In 1984, King Carl XVI Gustaf of Sweden and Queen Silvia of Sweden paid their first official visits to Brazil. Queen Silvia is of Brazilian descent on her mother's side. In 1991, President Fernando Collor de Mello became the first Brazilian head-of-state to visit Sweden. Since the initial visits, there would be numerous visits and reunions between leaders of both nations and from the Swedish royal family including the visits by King Carl XVI Gustaf to Brazil in 2010, 2012 and again in 2017. In 2011, Prime Minister Fredrik Reinfeldt became the first Swedish head-of-government to visit Brazil.

In 1953, the Swedish-Brazilian Chamber of Commerce opened in São Paulo. Currently, there are more than 220 Swedish companies operating in Brazil. Technical-military cooperation is an important aspect of the bilateral relationship, having gained new dynamism with the decision of the Brazilian Government to acquire, under the FX-2 Program, Swedish Saab Gripen NG fighters for the Brazilian Air Force.

The Brazil-Sweden Center for Research and Innovation (CISB), based in São Bernardo do Campo and opened in 2011; aims to contribute to the development of cutting-edge technological sectors in both countries through the identification, development and support of high-tech research projects in different areas of knowledge. Its main areas of activity are aerospace, defense and sustainable cities, with emphasis on public safety, urban sanitation and solid waste treatment.

== High-level visits ==
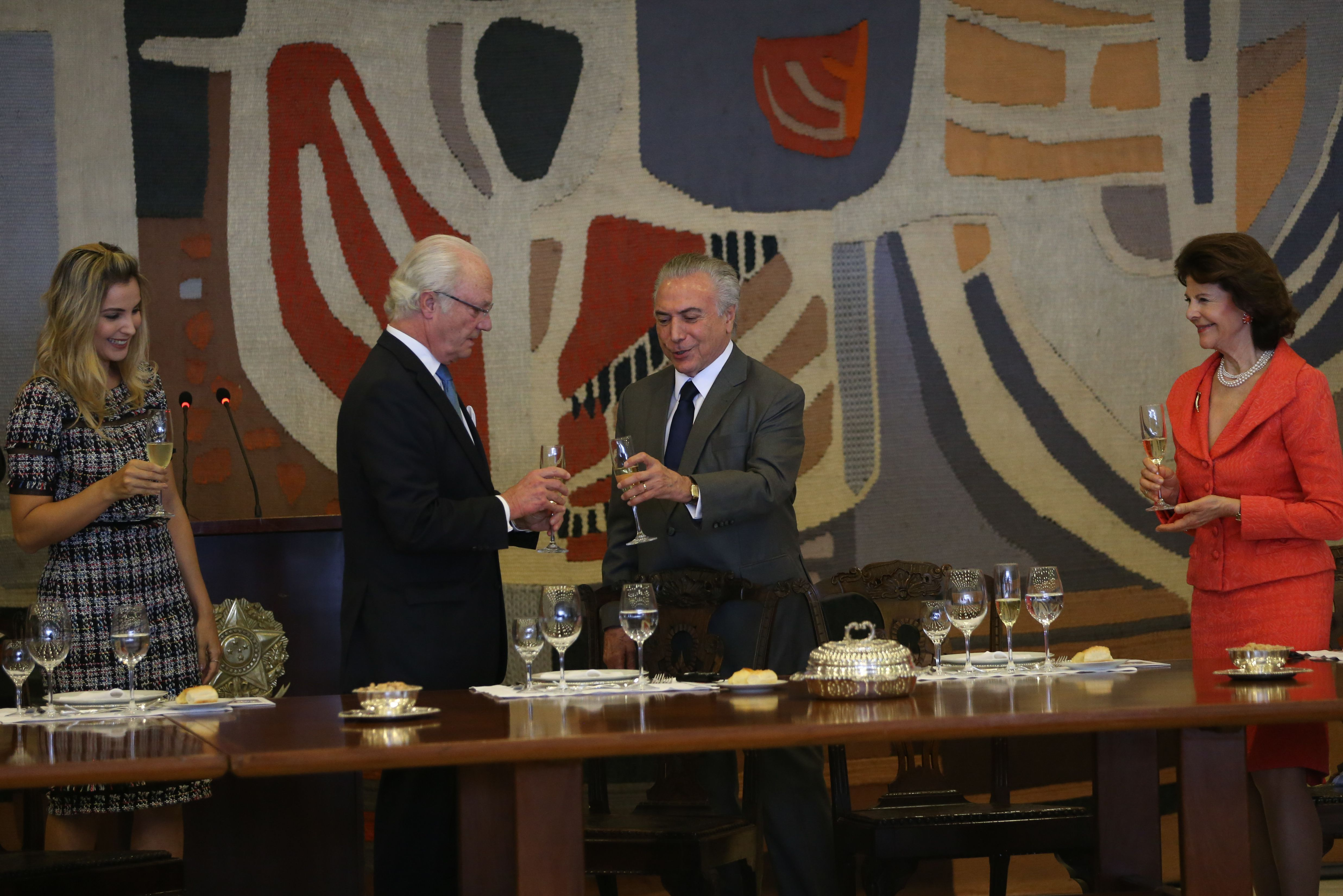
Brazilian President Michel Temer hosting King Carl XVI Gustaf of Sweden and Queen Silvia of Sweden in Brasília; 2017.

High-level visits from Brazil to Sweden

- Emperor Pedro II of Brazil (1876)
- President Fernando Collor de Mello (1991)
- President Fernando Henrique Cardoso (2002)
- President Luiz Inácio Lula da Silva (2007, 2009)
- Vice President Michel Temer (2012)
- Foreign Minister Antonio Patriota (2012)
- President Dilma Rousseff (2015)

High-level visits from Sweden to Brazil

- King Carl XVI Gustaf of Sweden (1984, 2010, 2012, 2017)
- Queen Silvia of Sweden (1984, 2008, 2010, 2011, 2017)
- Crown Princess Victoria (2002)
- Foreign Minister Carl Bildt (2010)
- Prime Minister Fredrik Reinfeldt (2011, 2012)
- Prime Minister Stefan Löfven (2015)

== Bilateral agreements ==
Both nations have signed a few agreements such an Agreement to Avoid Double Taxation in Matters of Income Taxes (1975); Agreement on Economic, Industrial and Technological Cooperation (1984); Memorandum of Understanding on Cooperation in the field of Bioenergy, including Biofuels (2007); Agreement of Cooperation in High Industrial and Innovative Technology (2009) and a Defense Agreement (2014).

== Resident diplomatic missions ==
- Brazil has an embassy in Stockholm.
- Sweden has an embassy in Brasília.
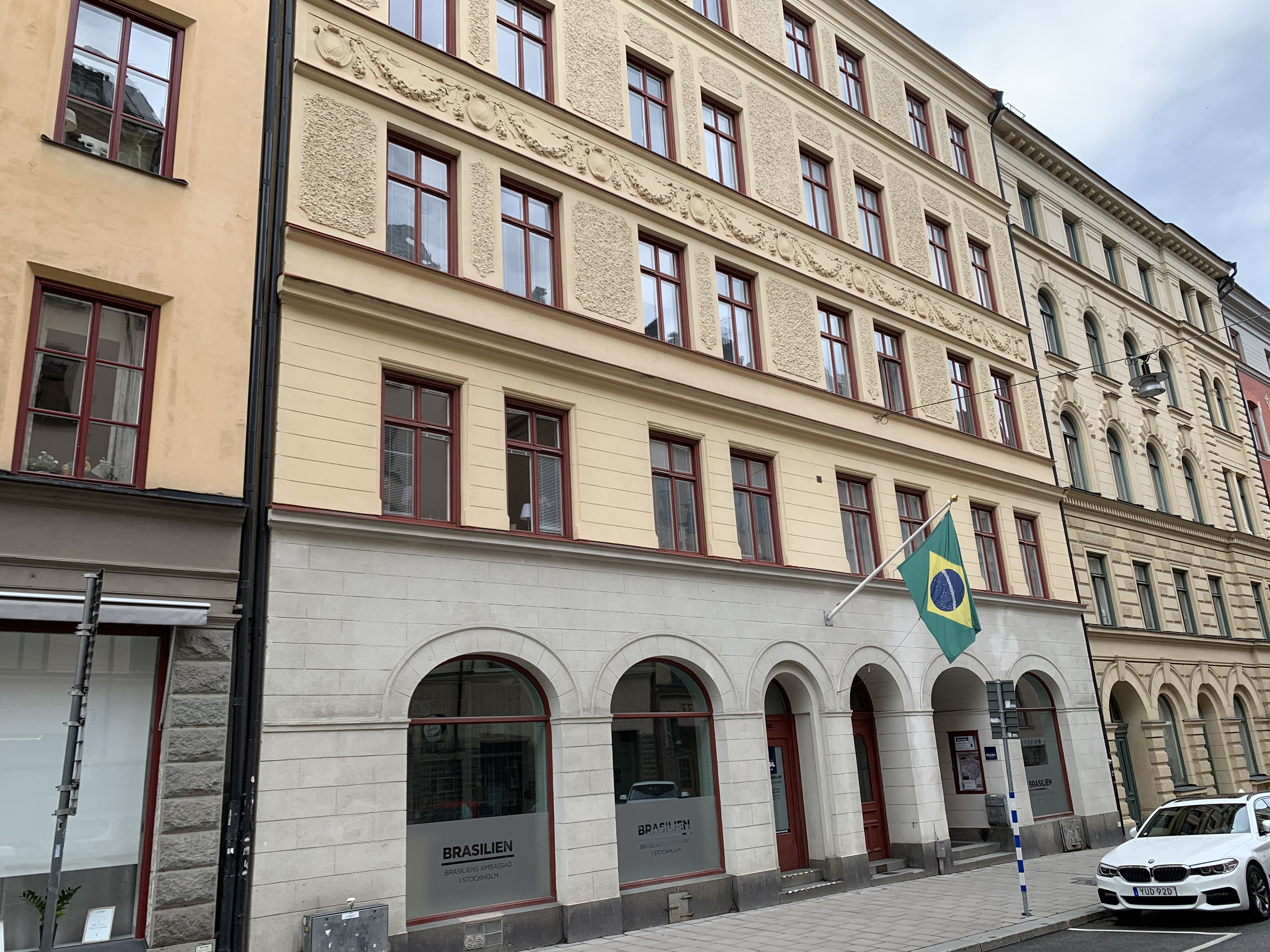
Embassy of Brazil in Stockholm

== See also ==
- Foreign relations of Brazil
- Foreign relations of Sweden
- Scandinavian Brazilians
