= Brazil–Netherlands relations =

- Brazil: Netherlands

Diplomatic mission
- Embassy of Brazil, The Hague: Embassy of the Netherlands, Brasília

Brazil and the Netherlands maintain bilateral relations. Brazil has an embassy in The Hague and a consulate in Amsterdam, and the Netherlands is represented by an embassy in Brasília and consulates in Belém, Belo Horizonte, Curitiba, Fortaleza, Manaus, Natal, Porto Alegre, Recife, Salvador, Rio de Janeiro, Santos, São Paulo and Vila Velha.

== History ==
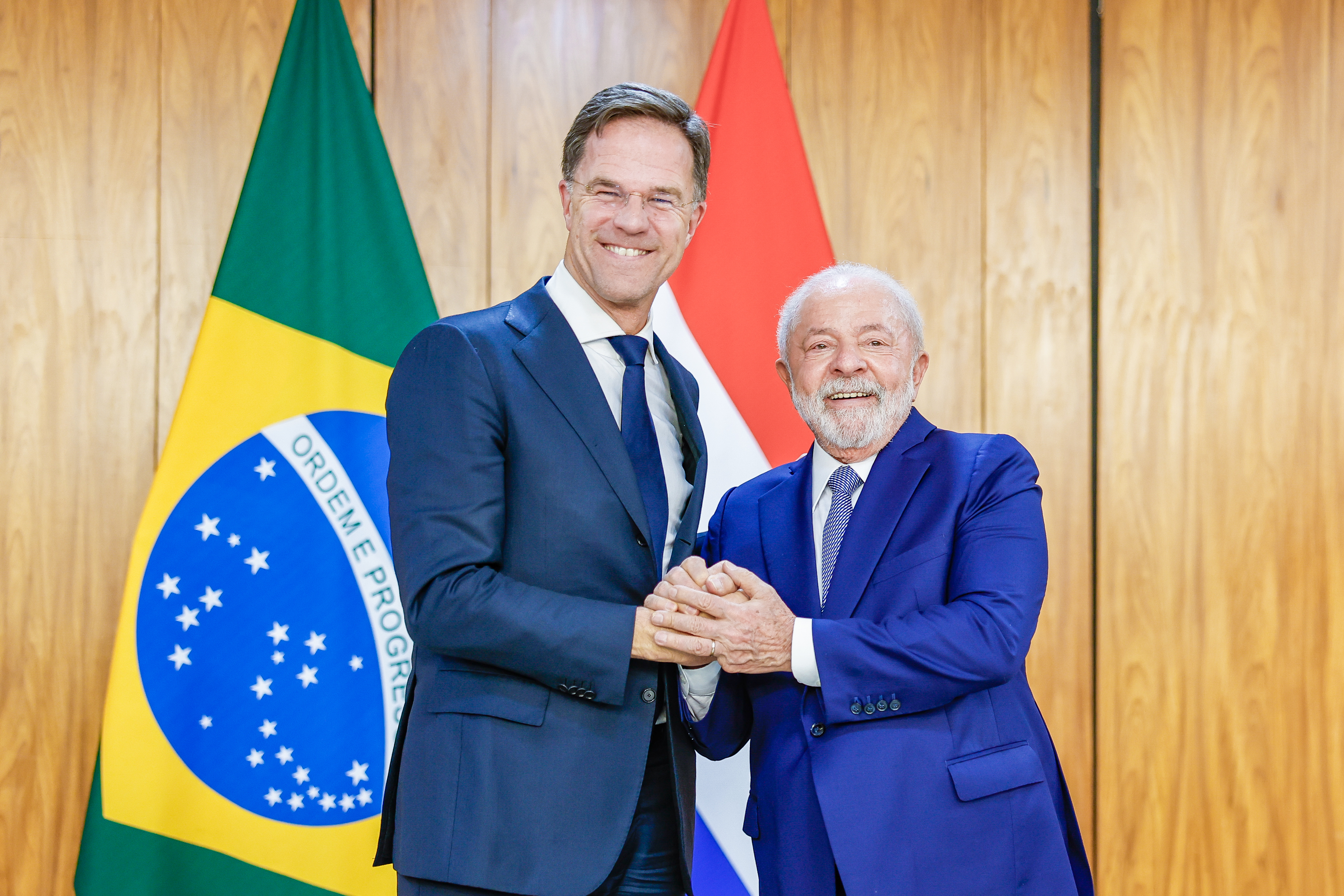
Dutch Prime Minister Mark Rutte with Brazilian President Luiz Inácio Lula da Silva in Brasília, 9 May 2023

Brazil and the Netherlands share a historical and economic relationship that goes back to the 16th century, when the Dutch financed the establishment of the sugar industry in Northeast Brazil In exchange for their investments, the Dutch received the right to refine and distribute Brazilian sugar in Europe. They distributed it, mainly in France and England.

=== Dutch Brazil ===
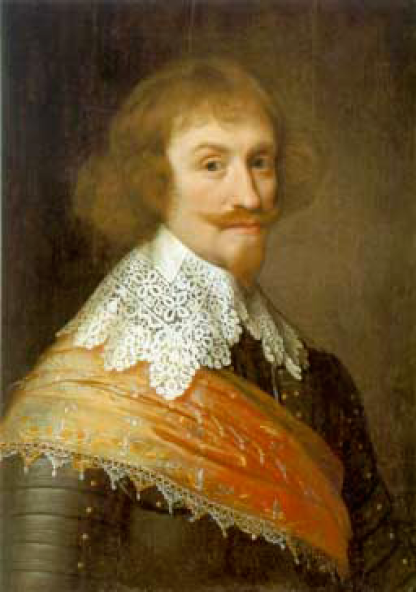
Count Maurice of Nassau, Governor-General of Dutch Brazil

The historical, cultural, and economic relationship between the two countries has as its initial milestone the Dutch occupation of the Brazilian Northeast in the 17th century Once the conquered territory in the region was consolidated, Count Maurice of Nassau was appointed governor-general of Dutch Brazil by the Dutch West India Company. When Count Maurice of Nassau arrived in Brazil, he brought with him an entourage consisting of artists and scientists, which included the painters Frans Post and Albert Eckhout who first depicted the Brazilian landscape and its inhabitants and the physician and naturopath Willem Piso and botanist Georg Marggraf who described the flora, fauna and culture of Brazil in the scientific work Historia Naturalis Brasiliae.

During the administration of Count Maurice of Nassau, bridges, dikes, a botanical garden, and the first astronomical observatory in the Americas were built in Recife. The freedom of religion instituted by him in the colony also attracted Dutch Jews, who founded in the current city of Recife the first Jewish temple in the Americas, the Kahal Zur Israel Synagogue.

=== Dutch immigration in Brazil ===
In the mid-1850s, a group of Dutch immigrants emigrated to Brazil and settled in the state of Espírito Santo, where they established the Holanda and Holandinha colonies.

A group of Dutch immigrants settled in the Campos Gerais region of Paraná and founded the Carambeí Colony in early April 1911. Because of the centennial of Dutch immigration in the Campos Gerais do Paraná, the Brazilian government instituted 2011 as the Year of the Netherlands in Brazil.

In mid-1948, another group of Dutch immigrants settled in the interior of São Paulo, where they founded the Holambra colony, currently an emancipated municipality.

== Bilateral agreements ==
The diplomatic ties between the two countries date back to 1828, when the Empire of Brazil and the United Kingdom of the Netherlands signed a Treaty of Friendship, Navigation, and Commerce.

In 1990, the governments of Brazil and the Netherlands signed a treaty to avoid double taxation in both countries.

In 2011, Brazil and the Netherlands signed a military cooperation agreement, which includes joint military training in peace operations. The following year, the two countries signed an agreement related to logistics and on intermodal transport management.

== Economic relations ==
The Netherlands was from the beginning of the 2000s until the end of the 2010s the largest direct investor in Brazil. In 2020, Brazil became the third largest exporter of goods to the Netherlands.

The European country is the largest importer of soybeans in the European Union, and distributes two thirds to Germany, Belgium and Denmark. The Netherlands imports 60% of Brazilian soybeans, which enter the country through the ports of Amsterdam and Rotterdam.

== Resident diplomatic missions ==
Of Brazil

- The Hague (Embassy)
- Amsterdam (Consulate-General)

Of the Netherlands

- Brasília (Embassy)
- Rio de Janeiro (Consulate-General)
- São Paulo (Consulate-General)

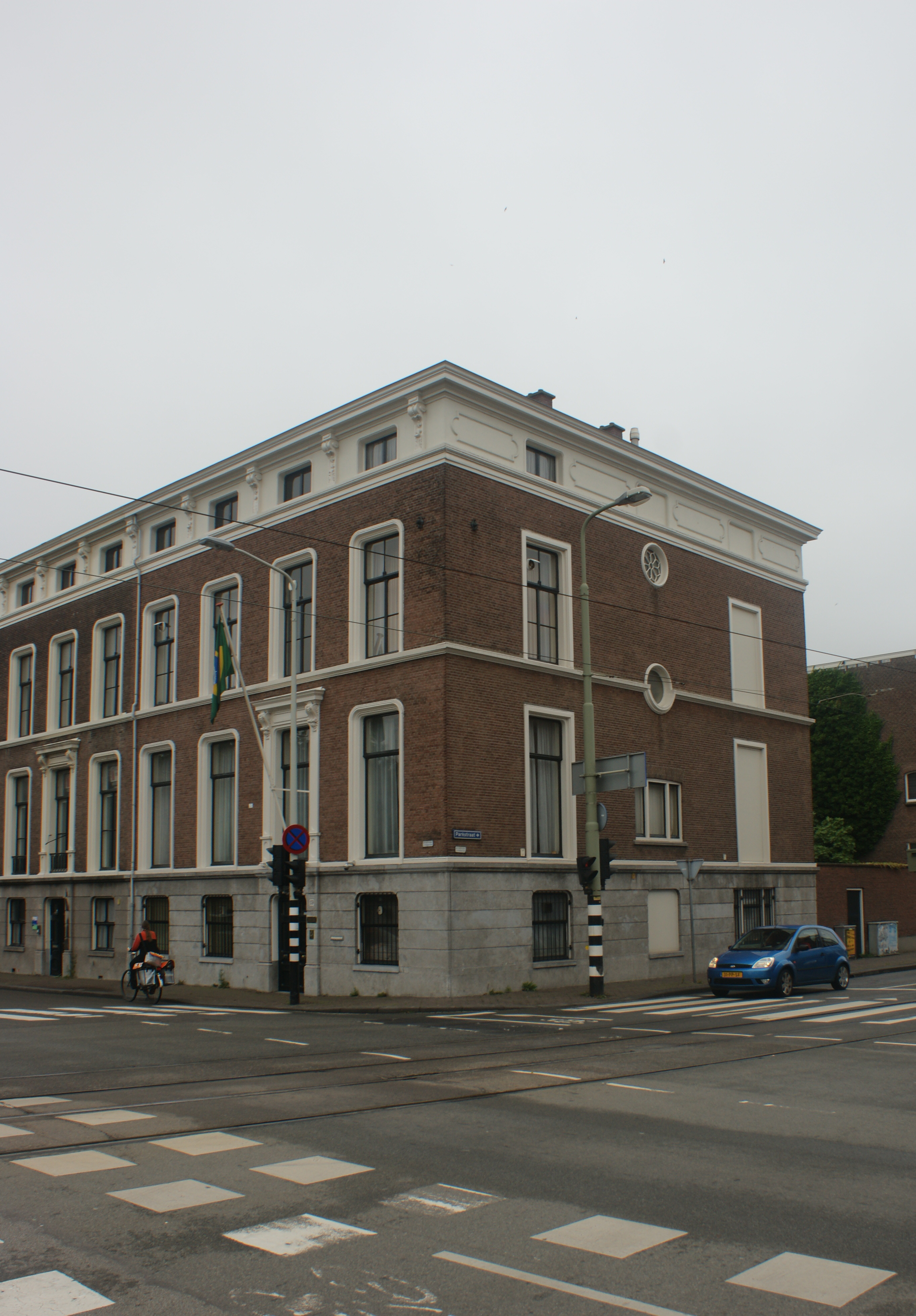
Embassy of Brazil in The Hague

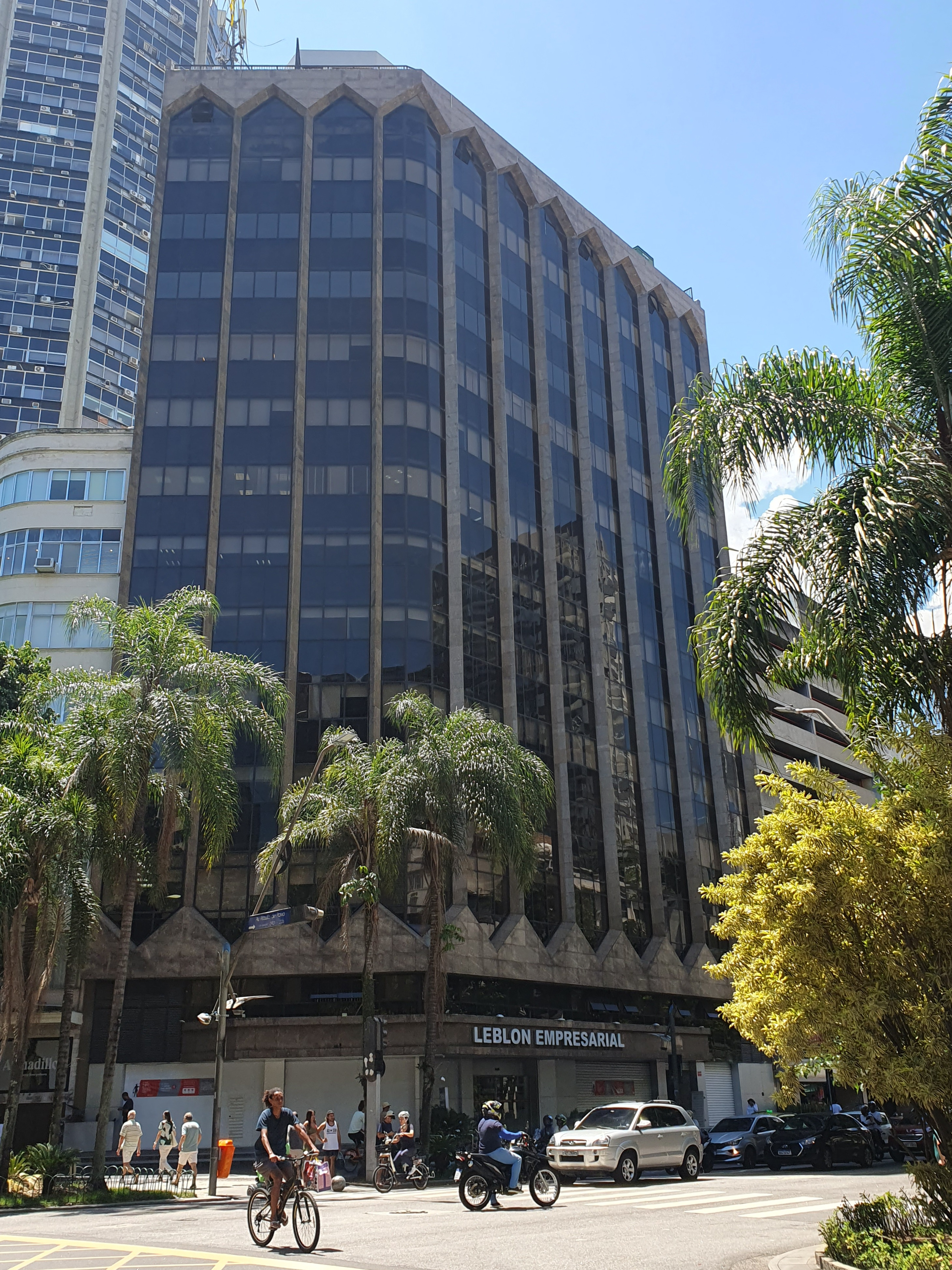
Building hosting the Consulate-General of the Netherlands in Rio de Janeiro

== See also ==
- Foreign relations of Brazil
- Foreign relations of the Netherlands
- Dutch Brazilians
- Brazilians in the Netherlands
