= Brazil–Denmark relations =

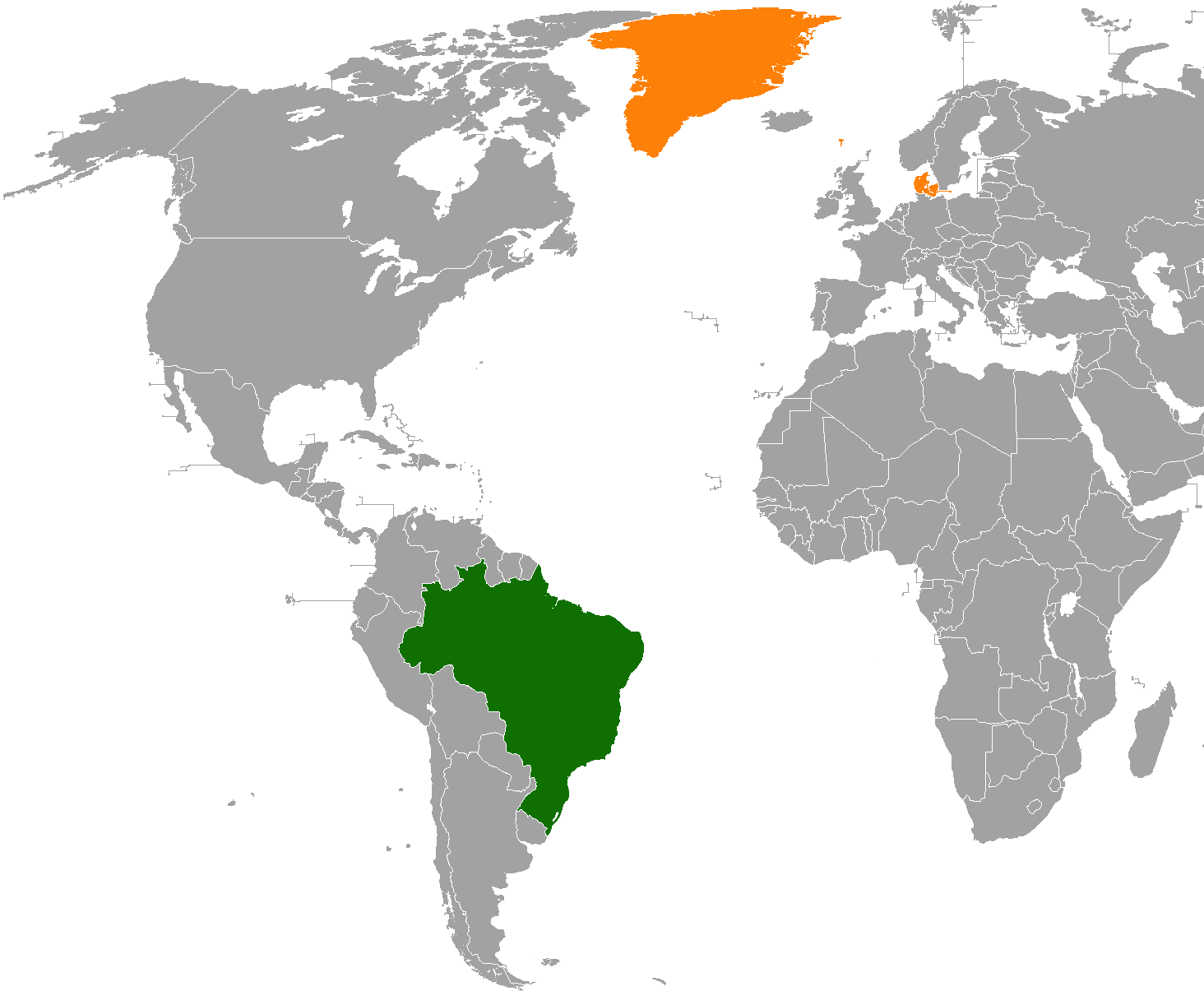
- Brazil: Denmark

Brazil–Denmark relations are the diplomatic relations between the Federative Republic of Brazil and the Kingdom of Denmark. Both nations are members of the United Nations.

== History ==
Diplomatic relations between Brazil and Denmark were established in 1828, after a Treaty of Commerce and Navigation was signed. In 1829, Brazil opened a diplomatic legation in Copenhagen. In 1876, during his second tour of Europe, Emperor Pedro II of Brazil paid a visit to Denmark and met with King Christian IX of Denmark.

In 1999, Queen Margrethe II of Denmark paid an official visit to Brazil. In April 2007, Prime Minister Anders Fogh Rasmussen became the first Danish head-of-government to visit Brazil. In September 2007, President Luiz Inácio Lula da Silva became the first Brazilian head-of-state to visit Denmark. There would be numerous visits and reunions between leaders of both nations.

The relations between Brazil and Denmark are cordial, with convergences and affinities between the values and positions of both countries. Both nations advocate the peaceful settlement of disputes and value the role of international organizations as forums for international cooperation. During the Rio+20 Conference in June 2012, President Dilma Rousseff met with Prime Minister Helle Thorning-Schmidt. In addition to multilateral issues, both leaders addressed the deepening of technological, scientific and educational cooperation. Prime Minister Thorning-Schmidt stressed the Danish interest in Brazil's involvement in the "Global Green Growth Forum - 3GF", aimed at partnerships within the "green economy".

== High-level visits ==
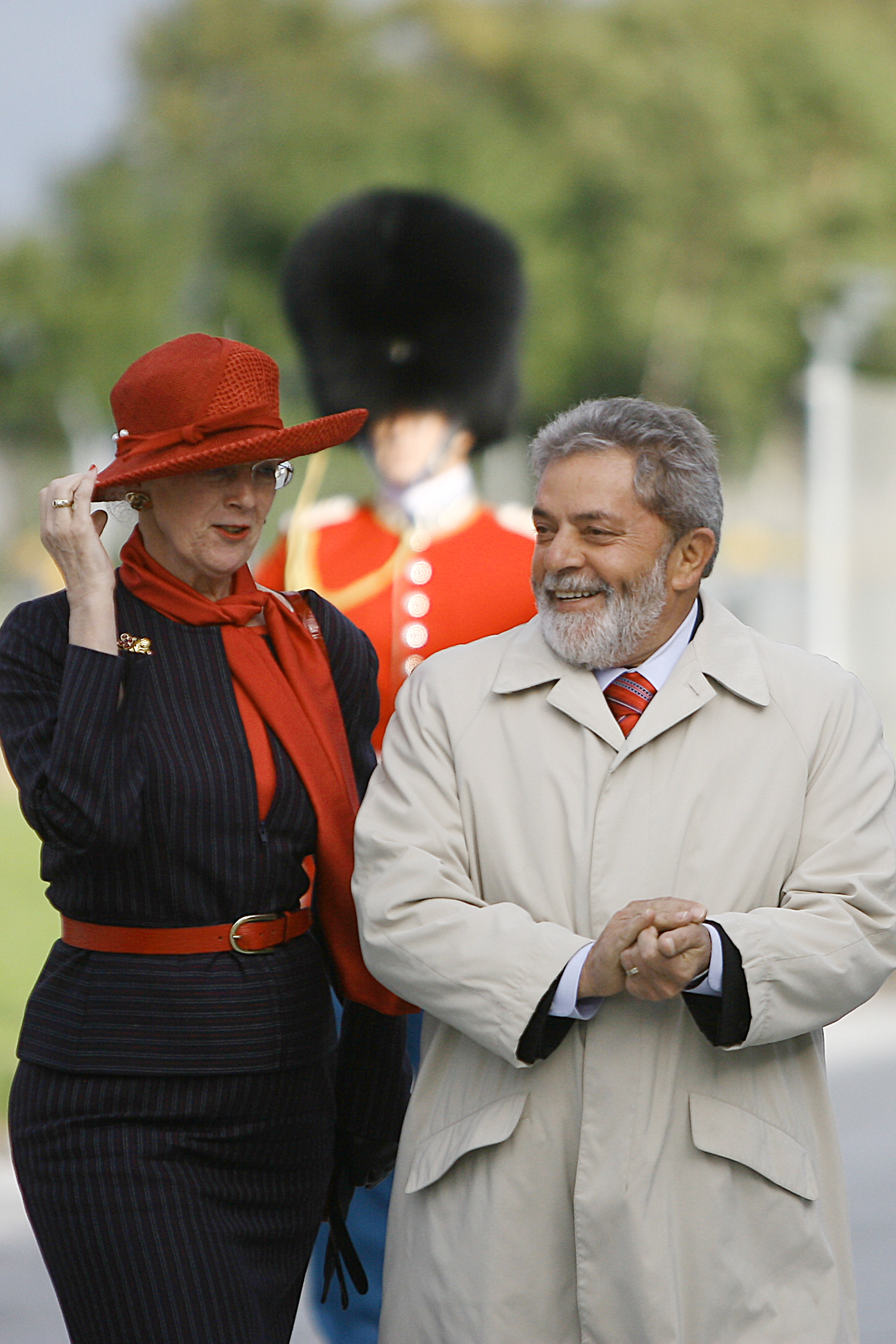
Queen Margrethe II of Denmark and Brazilian President Luiz Inácio Lula da Silva in Copenhagen; 2007.

High-level visits from Brazil to Denmark

- Emperor Pedro II of Brazil (1876)
- Vice President Marco Maciel (2002)
- President Luiz Inácio Lula da Silva (2007, 2009)

High-level visits from Denmark to Brazil

- Queen Margrethe II of Denmark (1999)
- Prime Minister Anders Fogh Rasmussen (2007)
- Prince Joachim of Denmark (2010)
- Crown Prince Frederik (2012)
- Prime Minister Helle Thorning-Schmidt (2012)
- Foreign Minister Kristian Jensen (2016)
- Queen Mary of Denmark (2024, 2025)

== Bilateral agreements ==
Both nations have signed a few agreements such a Treaty of Commerce and Navigation (1828); Agreement on Technical Cooperation (1966); Agreement for Air Transport (1969); Agreement to Avoid Double Taxation and Prevent Tax Evasion in Matters of Income Tax (1974); Agreement on Economic and Industrial Cooperation (1979); Agreement on Scientific and Technological Cooperation (1986); Memorandum of Understanding on Cooperation in the area of Climate Change and Development and Execution of projects under the Clean Development Mechanism of the Kyoto Protocol (2007); Memorandum of Understanding between the Brazilian Ministry of Science, Technology, Innovation and Communication and the Danish Ministry of Higher Education and Science for cooperation in the areas of higher education, science, technology and innovation (2011).

== Resident diplomatic missions ==
Of Brazil

- Copenhagen (Embassy)

Of Denmark

- Brasília (Embassy)
- São Paulo (Consulate-General)

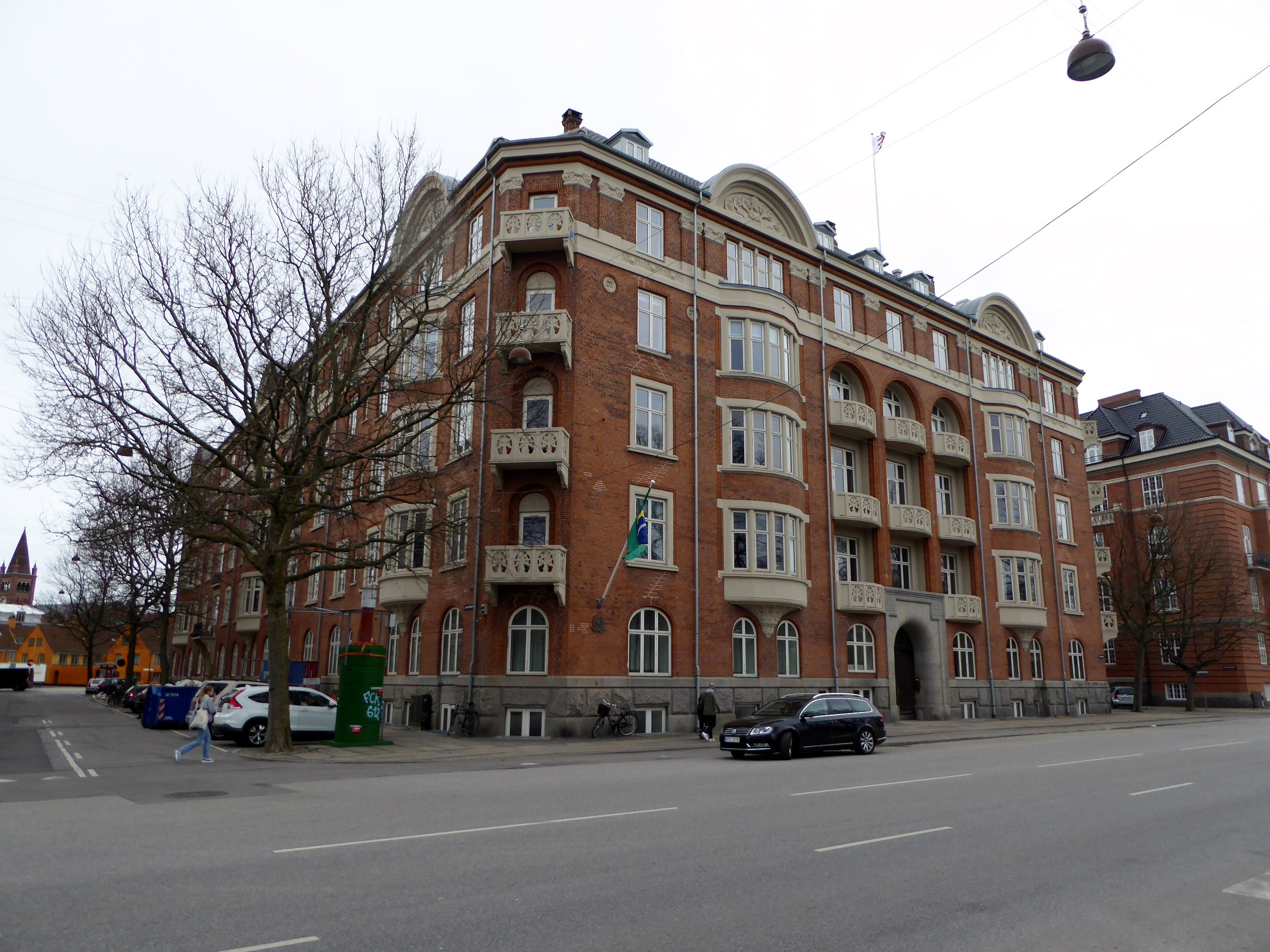
Embassy of Brazil in Copenhagen

== See also ==
- Scandinavian Brazilians
