= Bolivians in Brazil =

Bolivians in Brazil Boliviano Brasileiros Bolivianos en Brasil
Total population
- 350,000

Regions with significant populations
- São Paulo, Belo Horizonte

Languages
- Spanish, Portuguese, minority Aymara and Quechua

Religion
- Mostly Roman Catholicism and Folk religions.

Related ethnic groups
- Bolivians other Brazilian, Spanish, Hispanic and Hispanophone people

Bolivians in Brazil are individuals of full, partial, or predominantly Bolivian ancestry, or a Bolivian-born person residing in Brazil. Bolivian migration to Brazil began in the 1950s and increased significantly from the 1980s onward, driven by economic instability in Bolivia and labor demand in Brazil's textile industry. In the 21st century, migration flows have continued to grow, with estimates placing the Bolivian population in Brazil at around 350,000, primarily concentrated in São Paulo. Internal migration has led to the formation of Bolivian communities in other regions, such as Belo Horizonte. Bolivians in Brazil often live in multilingual households and face challenges related to documentation, labor exploitation, discrimination, and access to public services.

== History ==
Bolivian migration to Brazil began in the 1950s, initially consisting of young, middle-class individuals pursuing education. Migration intensified in the 1980s due to economic difficulties in Bolivia and the growth of Brazil's textile industry. By the 1990s, Bolivians became one of the most prominent Latin American immigrant groups in Brazil. In the 21st century, their numbers increased significantly, with the National Migratory Registry System (SISMIGRA) recording 137,115 Bolivians between 2000 and 2021, peaking in 2009. This growth was facilitated by the implementation of the Mercosur Residence Agreement (Decree No. 6.975/2009), which eased residency requirements for citizens of member states. The governments of Bolivia and Brazil have begun to develop an agreement to regularize the situation of several thousand undocumented Bolivian immigrants in Brazil.

== Geographic distribution ==
According to 2018 estimates from the General Consulate of Bolivia, approximately 350,000 Bolivians reside in Brazil, with their presence being most significant in the city of São Paulo. Between 2000 and 2019, approximately 74.75% of registered Bolivians in Brazil resided in the city. However, recent years have seen internal migration to other regions, notably the Metropolitan Region of Belo Horizonte in Minas Gerais. This shift is attributed to labor market changes, perceived improvements in quality of life, and attempts to escape xenoracism and exploitative labor conditions in São Paulo.

The majority of Bolivian immigrants in Brazil are adults aged 20–30, though the proportion of children has grown in recent years. The gender distribution has become balanced, with women accounting for over half of registrations as of May 2021. Most originate from urban centers such as La Paz, Sucre, Oruro, Cochabamba, and El Alto, though many come from rural Andean regions, reflecting patterns of internal migration followed by cross-border migration.

Among Bolivian immigrants, approximately 70% are married and 74% have children, with a significant portion having at least one Brazilian-born child. Educational attainment is relatively high, with about two-thirds having completed secondary education, though this does not always translate to better employment opportunities in Brazil due to language barriers and limited job options. A 2012 study estimated that approximately 60,000 Bolivians had legal residency status in the city of São Paulo, out of a total Bolivian population of around 200,000, suggesting that roughly 140,000 were living in the country without legal documentation. Ethnographic reports have found that Bolivians in Corumbá are regularly subject to racial discrimination.

Bolivians in Brazil often live in multilingual environments. Spanish serves as the primary language in most social and professional contexts within the community, while Portuguese is used for interactions with the broader Brazilian society. Aymara and Quechua are commonly spoken among families and close social groups, especially among those from indigenous regions. Although linguistic similarities between Spanish and Portuguese can facilitate communication, language barriers remain a challenge, particularly in healthcare settings.

== See also ==
- Bolivia–Brazil relations
- Bolivian diaspora
- Immigration to Brazil
- Brazilian Bolivians
