= Brazil v Germany =

Brazil v Germany may refer to:

- 2002 FIFA World Cup Final
- Brazil v Germany (2014 FIFA World Cup)
- Brazil–Germany relations
