= Brazilians =

People of Brazil

Brasileiros

Total population
- c. 203 million (2022 census)

Regions with significant populations
- Brazilian diaspora: c. 4.9 million (2023)
- United States: 2,085,000
- Portugal: 513,000
- Paraguay: 263,200
- United Kingdom: 230,000
- Japan: 210,471
- Germany: 170,400
- Spain: 161,944
- Italy: 159,000
- Canada: 143,500
- Argentina: 101,502
- France: 95,000
- French Guiana: 92,493
- Ireland: 80,000
- Netherlands: 80,000
- Bolivia: 75,700
- Switzerland: 64,000
- Belgium: 50,000
- Australia: 48,180
- Mexico: 32,784
- Uruguay: 31,050
- Suriname: 30,000
- Angola: 25,000

Languages
- Brazilian Portuguese (Majority), Indigenous Languages, Brazilian Sign Language(LIBRAS), other Languages of Brazil

Brazilians (Portuguese: brasileiros, pronounced [bɾaziˈle(j)ɾus]) are citizens and people associated with Brazil. This connection can be historic, cultural or legal. For most Brazilians several (or all) of these connections exist and are all sources of their Brazilian identity, sharing a common culture, language and in many cases history and/or ancestry. Brazil is a multiethnic society, which means that it is home to people of many ethnic origins.

Being Brazilian is a civic and cultural phenomenon, rather than an ethnic one. As a result, the degree to which Brazilian citizens identify with their ancestral roots varies significantly depending on the individual, the region of the country, and the specific ethnic origins in question. Most often, however, the idea of ethnicity as it is understood in the anglophone world is not popular in the country.

After the colonization of Brazil by Portugal, most of the 16th century, the word "Brazilian" was given to the Portuguese merchants of the Brazilwood tree, designating exclusively the name of such profession, since the inhabitants of the land were, in most of them, indigenous, or Portuguese born in Portugal or in the territory now called Brazil.

However, long before the independence of Brazil, in 1822, both in Brazil and in Portugal, it was already common to assign the Brazilian gentilic to a person, usually of clear Portuguese descent, resident or whose family resided in the State of Brazil (1530–1815), belonging to the Portuguese Empire. During the lifetime of the United Kingdom of Portugal, Brazil and the Algarves (1815–1822), however, there was confusion about the nomenclature.

== Definition ==
According to the Constitution of Brazil, a Brazilian citizen is:

- Anyone born in Brazil, even if to foreign born parents. However, if the foreign parents were at the service of a foreign State (such as foreign diplomats), the child is not Brazilian;
- Anyone born abroad to a Brazilian father or a Brazilian mother, with registration of birth in a Brazilian Embassy or Consulate. Also, a person born abroad to a Brazilian father or a Brazilian mother who was not registered but who, after turning 18 years old, went to live in Brazil;
- A foreigner living in Brazil who applied for and was accepted as a Brazilian citizen.

According to the Constitution, all people who hold Brazilian citizenship are equal, regardless of race, ethnicity, gender or religion.

A foreigner can apply for Brazilian citizenship after living for four uninterrupted years in Brazil and being able to speak the Portuguese language. A native person from an official Portuguese language country (Portugal, Angola, Mozambique, Cape Verde, São Tomé and Príncipe, Guinea Bissau, Equatorial Guinea, and East Timor) can request the Brazilian nationality after only 1 uninterrupted year living in Brazil. A foreign born person who holds Brazilian citizenship has exactly the same rights and duties of the Brazilian citizen by birth, but cannot occupy some special public positions such as the Presidency of the Republic, Vice-presidency of the Republic, Minister (Secretary) of Defense, Presidency (Speaker) of the Senate, Presidency (Speaker) of the House of Representatives, Officer of the Armed Forces, and Diplomat.

In 2021, the population in Brazil is 214 million people. The number is updated live by the Brazilian Institute of Geography and Statistics (IBGE – Census).

== Ethnicities ==
Brazil's census categories are not based on genetics, but on self-identified social and culturally constructed race classifications. It uses five categories for race and color: Branca (White), Preta (Black), Amarela (Yellow, referring to East Asians), Parda (Brown, for mixed-race people), and Indígena (Indigenous), which date to the colonial period. Studies have shown that many Brazilians change their racial self-identification over time.

In the 2010 census, 47.51% of Brazilians classified themselves as White, 43.42% as Brown, 7.52% as Black, 1.10% as Yellow, 0.43% as Indigenous and 0.02% did not answer. The racial composition of Brazil varies significantly by region, with higher percentages of White Brazilians in the South and Southeast, and higher percentages of Brown and Indigenous populations in the North and Northeast.

Brazilians are mostly descendants of Portuguese settlers, post-colonial immigrant groups, enslaved Africans, and Brazil's indigenous peoples. The main historic waves of immigration to Brazil have occurred from the 1820s well into the 1970s, most of the settlers were Portuguese, Italians, Germans, and Spaniards, with significant minorities of Japanese, Poles, Ukrainians, and Levantine Arabs.

=== Ancestry of Brazilians ===
The first inhabitants of what would become Brazil were people whose ancestry can be traced back to Asian populations that crossed the Bering Strait, passing from Siberia to the Americas. There are indications of the presence of indigenous peoples in the current Brazilian territory dating from 16,000 BC in Lagoa Santa, from 14,200 BC in Rio Claro and from 12,770 BC in Ibicuí (Rio Grande do Sul). Estimates of the number of Native Americans that were living in present-day Brazil in 1500 vary between 1 and 5 million. They were divided into two major language families: Macro-Jê and Macro-Tupi. With the arrival of the Portuguese in present-day Brazil, in 1500, a significant part of the indigenous population perished, mainly due to contamination by Eurasian diseases to which the Indians had no biological immunity, such as smallpox, measles, yellow fever or flu. In most cases, these contaminations were involuntary; however, there are also reports of intentional infection. Despite this, millions of Brazilians have indigenous ancestry. In Brazilian history, the practice of "cunhadismo" was very common; it was an ancient indigenous practice of incorporating strangers into their community, through the delivery of indigenous girls as wives. In this context, many Portuguese settlers had relationships with indigenous women, whose descendants make up a large part of the current Brazilian population.

The European ancestry of Brazilians is mainly Portuguese. (Note: "In Brazil the predominant European sub-component matches mostly the Portugal/West-Spain reference group while in Mexico, Colombia, Peru, and Chile mostly Central/South-Spanish ancestry is inferred (Figures 1C and 2B). This differentiation matches the colonial history, Portuguese migration having concentrated in Eastern South America while the Spanish settled mainly in Central America and Western South America".) Between 1500 and 1822, Brazil was a Portuguese colony and the number of Portuguese who emigrated to Brazil, during this period, is estimated at between 500,000 and 700,000. According to the IBGE, 100,000 Portuguese emigrated to Brazil in the first two centuries of colonization. Historians James Horn and Philip D. Morgan estimate this number to be much higher at 250,000. At that time, Brazil was the largest producer of sugar in the world (specifically the northeastern captaincies of Pernambuco and Bahia), and this economic growth attracted many Portuguese immigrants. However, it was in the 18th century that the greatest number of Portuguese arrived in colonial Brazil. According to the IBGE, 600,000 Portuguese emigrated to Brazil, between 1701 and 1760. James Horn and Philip D. Morgan pointed to smaller numbers: 250,000 between 1700 and 1760 and 105,000 between 1760 and 1820. Celso Furtado estimated, for the entire 18th century, that between 300,000 and 500,000 Portuguese arrived in Brazil. Maria Luiza Marcilio pointed to an intermediate number: 400,000. Considering that Portugal only had 2 million inhabitants in 1700, it was a mass emigration. The reason for this mass emigration lies in the discovery of gold in Minas Gerais, which led to a period of economic prosperity not only in the Minas Gerais region, but also on the Brazilian coast.

As a result of the Atlantic slave trade, from the mid-16th century until 1855, approximately 5 million African slaves were brought to Brazil. 40% of all slaves brought to the Americas landed in Brazil. The African ancestors of Brazilians were brought mainly from West-Central Africa. Of the total, 3,396,910 were brought from this area. The region used to be known as Congo Angola, roughly corresponding to the territories of present-day Angola, Republic of Congo, Democratic Republic of Congo and Gabon. The second most important region was the Bight of Benin, from which 877,033 Africans came. This region corresponds to present-day southeastern Ghana, Togo, Benin, and southwestern Nigeria.

Slave labor was the driving force behind the growth of the sugar economy in Brazil, and sugar was the colony's main export product, from 1600 to 1650. Gold and diamond deposits were discovered in Brazil from 1690 onwards, which generated an increase in the importation of slaves, to supply labor in mining. The demand for slaves did not suffer from the decline of the mining industry in the second half of the 18th century. Livestock and food production proliferated along with population growth, both heavily dependent on slave labor. The rise of coffee economy after the 1830s further expanded the Atlantic slave trade to Brazil.

When Brazil was a Portuguese colony, the number of Africans who entered Brazil was much greater than that of Europeans. According to Historians James Horn and Philip D. Morgan, between 1500 and 1820, 605,000 Portuguese emigrated to Brazil, against 3.2 million Africans brought, a number 5 times greater. However, this does not mean that over time the population of African origin remained greater than that of Portuguese origin in the same proportion, given the differences in birth rate. In Brazil, the mortality rate was much higher among slaves than among the free; the infant mortality of the children of slaves was very high, due to malnutrition and unhealthy conditions. During most of Brazil's history, the rate of natural increase of the slave population was negative, that is, there were more deaths than births.

Many Brazilians are also descendants of immigrants who arrived in the last two centuries. Brazil received more than 5 million immigrants after its independence from Portugal in 1822, most of whom arrived between 1880 and 1920. Latin Europeans accounted for 80% of arrivals (1.8 million Portuguese, 1.3 million Italians and 700,000 Spaniards). The other 20% came mainly from Germany, Eastern Europe, Japan and the Middle East. In the Brazilian 1920 census, more than 90% of foreigners were concentrated in the states of the Southeast and South regions and more than 70% were in just two regions: São Paulo and Rio de Janeiro. A large part of this immigration was encouraged by the Brazilian government and was linked to the production of coffee. At the end of the 19th century, Brazil was the largest coffee producer in the world and a significant part of the financial health of the Brazilian government depended on coffee exports. After the abolition of slavery in the 1880s and fearing a shortage of workers in coffee cultivation, the state of São Paulo began to subsidize immigration for European workers. The Brazilian government paid for ship's passage for entire immigrant families to work on coffee plantations during a period of about five years, after which they were free to work elsewhere.

Another model of immigration encouraged by the Brazilian government was aimed at agricultural colonization, mainly in the South of the country, where access to small rural properties for European immigrants was facilitated, mainly as a way of filling demographic voids and overcoming the constant threats of food shortages in Brazil.

However, many of these immigrants arrived spontaneously, without any help from the Brazilian government, and were attracted by the increase in urban dynamism, mainly in the Southeast region, largely linked to the surplus of wealth produced by the coffee activity, giving rise to an incipient process of industrialization and expansion of trade and the service sector.

From 1500 to 1972, of all people who entered Brazil, 58% came from Europe, 40% from Africa and 2% from Asia. Most Brazilians have a mixed race ancestry. Genetic studies have shown that Brazilians, whether classified as "brown", "white" or "black", usually have all three ancestries (European, African and indigenous), varying only in degree.

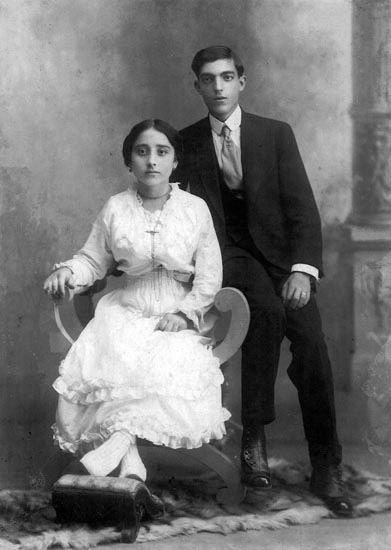
Portuguese immigrant couple in São José do Rio Preto (1887).

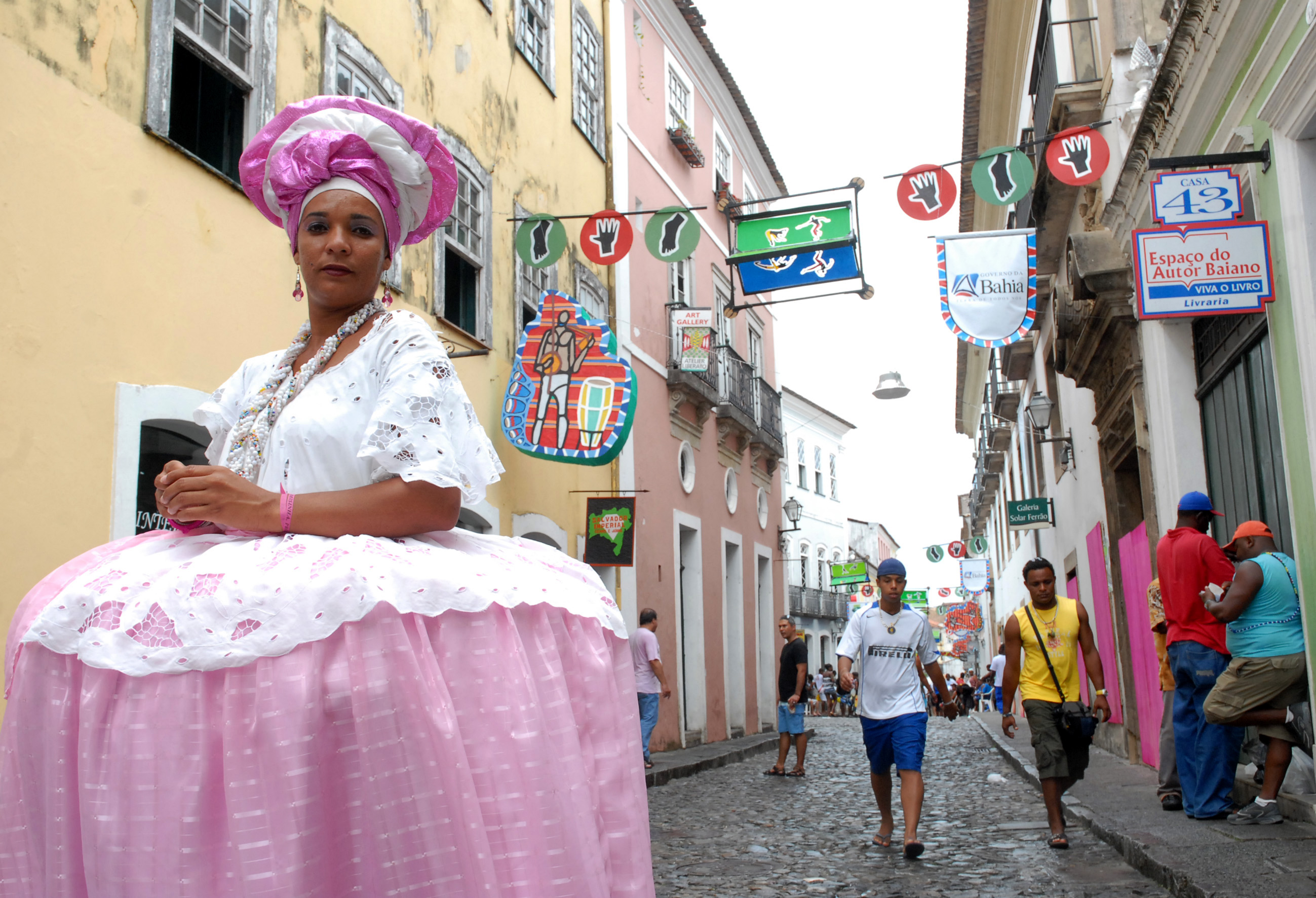
Typical dress of women from Bahia

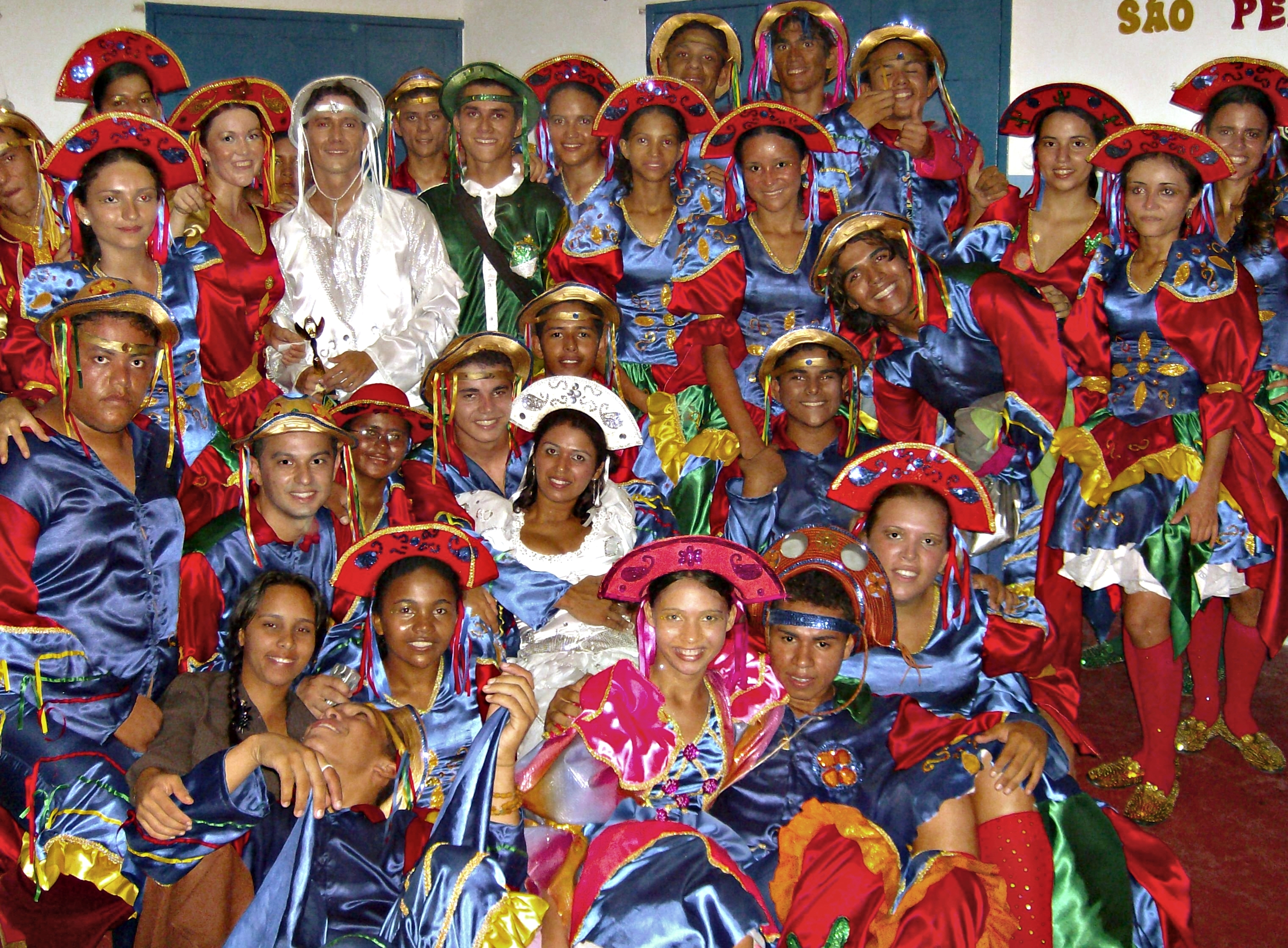
Brazilians from Belém, Paraíba, with typical clothes.

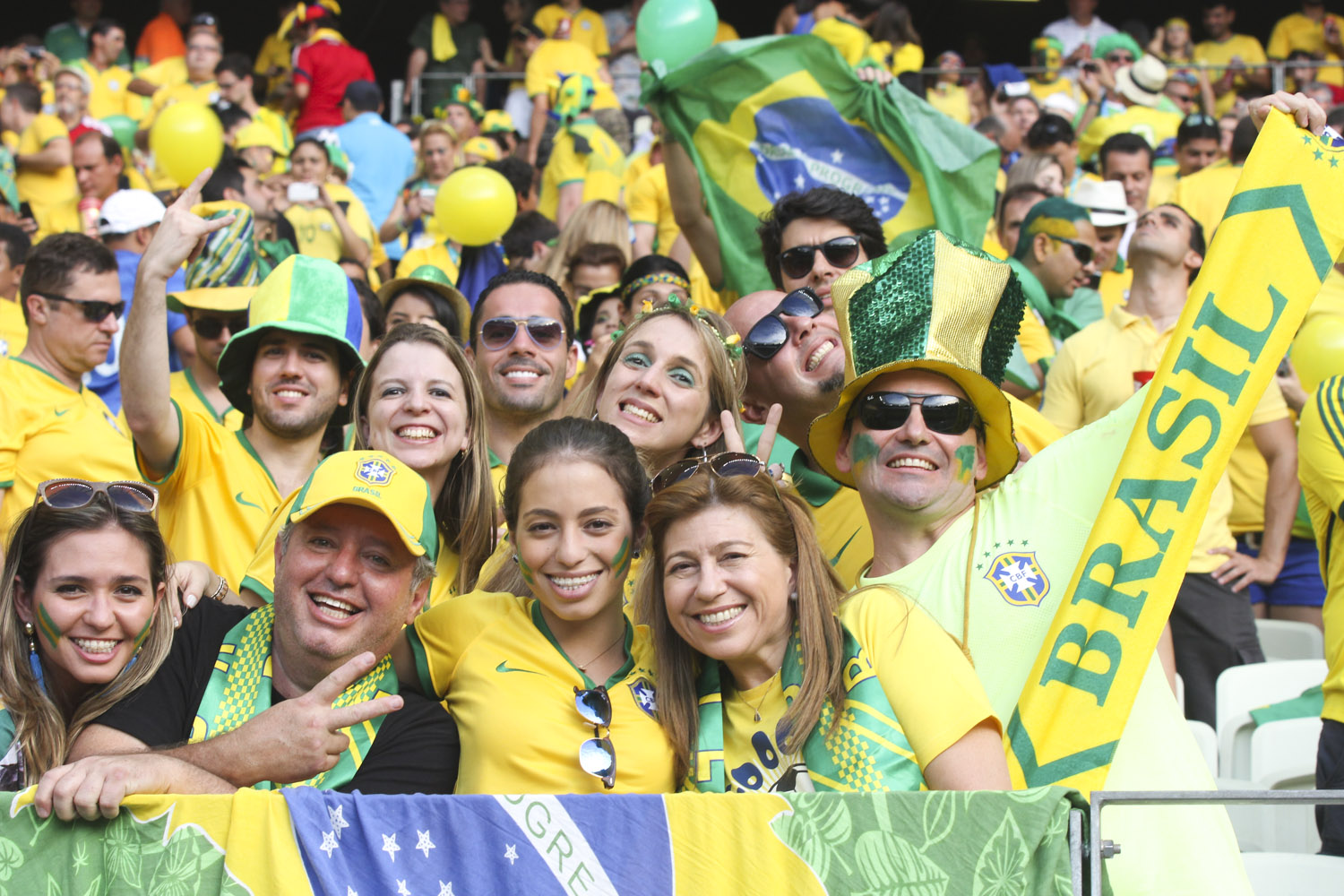
A group of Brazilians during the FIFA World Cup 2014.

=== Present foreign-born population ===
From 2011 to 2019, 1,085,673 immigrants came to Brazil, mostly from Venezuela (142,250), Paraguay (97,316), Bolivia (57,765), Haiti (54,182), and Colombia (32,562).

According to the 2022 census, Brazil was home to over 1 million foreign-born people, representing 0.5% of the total Brazilian population of 203 million. This showed an increase of 592,000 or 70.3% over the 2010 census. This was the highest number born abroad since 1980, when the census counted 1.1 million foreigners. By region:

- Latin America and the Caribbean (646,015)
- Europe (203,284)
- Asia (100,373)
- Africa (33,393)
- North America (24,811)
- Oceania (1,281).

Refugees

In 2021, there were 60,011 people recognized as refugees in Brazil.

Between 2011 and 2020, recognitions of refugee status in Brazil by the National Committee for Refugees (Conare) were mostly to Venezuelans (46,412 recognitions), Syrians (3,594) and Congolese (1,050).

== See also ==
- Lists of Brazilians
- Brazilian diaspora
- Immigration to Brazil
- Demographics of Brazil
- Pardo Brazilians
- European immigration to Brazil
- White Brazilians
- Portuguese Brazilians
- Italian Brazilians
- Spanish Brazilians
- German Brazilians
- Polish Brazilians
- Arab Brazilians
- History of the Jews in Brazil
- Native Brazilians
- Afro-Brazilians
- Asian Brazilians
- Japanese Brazilians
- Romani people in Brazil
- Brazilian Americans
- Lusitanics
- Brazilians in Japan
- Brazilians in Portugal
