= Brazil–Germany relations =

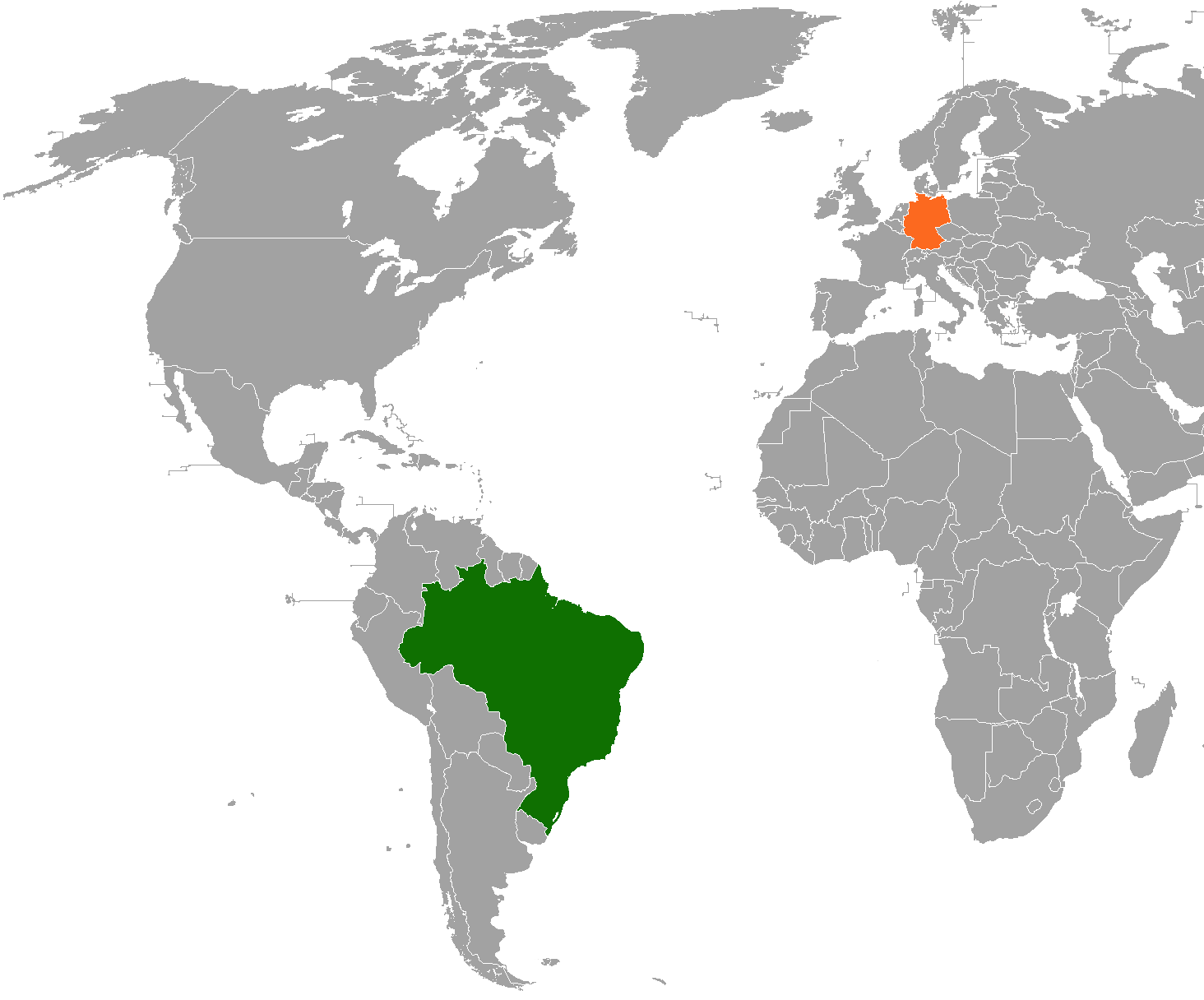

- Brazil: Germany

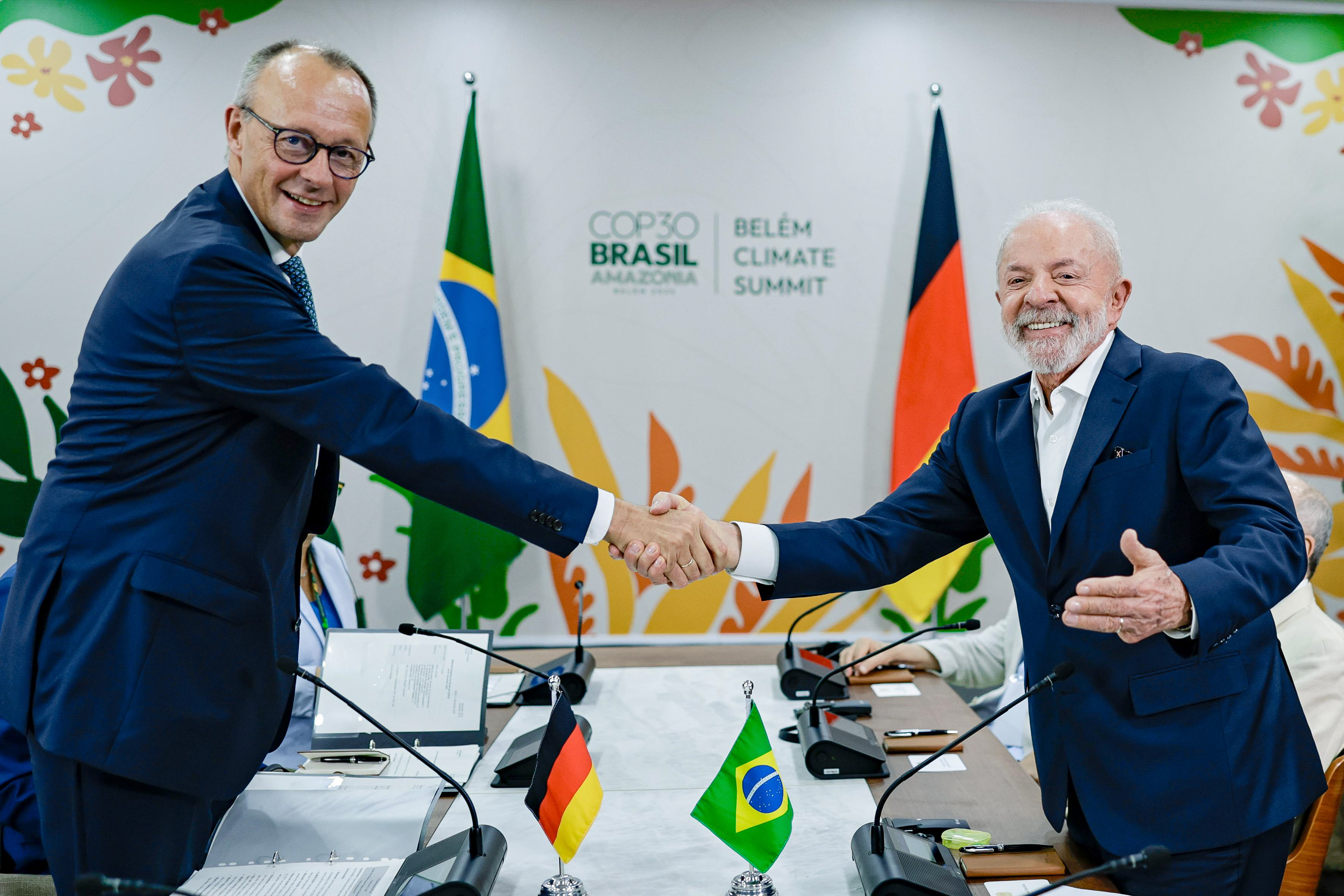
German Chancellor Friedrich Merz and Brazilian President Luiz Inácio Lula da Silva in Belém, Brazil, 7 November 2025

Brazil–Germany relations are the current and historical relations between the Federative Republic of Brazil and the Federal Republic of Germany. Both nations enjoy friendly relations, the importance of which centers on the history of German migration to Brazil. There are approximately 7 to 12 million Brazilians of German descent. Both nations are members of the G20 and the United Nations.

== History ==
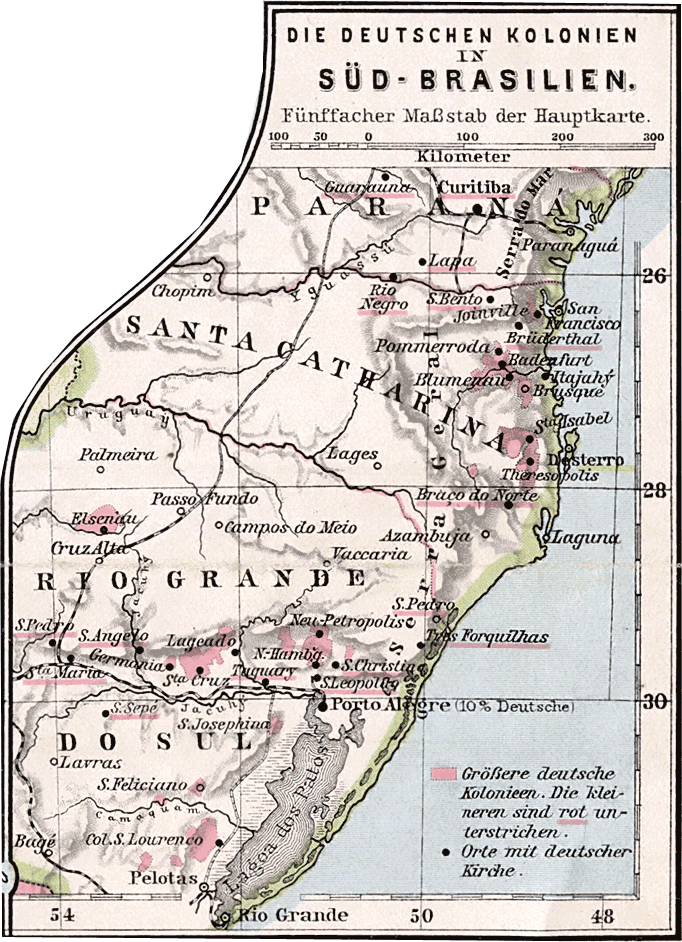
German communities (pink) in Southern Brazil in 1905

In 1822, soon after the declaration of Brazil's independence from Portugal, Brazilian Major Jorge Antonio Schäffer was sent to the various German courts to recruit colonists and soldiers to immigrate to Brazil. In 1824, the first German migrants began arriving to Brazil and settled in Rio Grande do Sul. In 1825, Prussia and the Hanseatic League recognized Brazil's independence. Soon afterwards, Brazil opened a consulate in Hamburg in 1826.

Brazil and Germany established diplomatic relations in 1871, shortly after German Unification and the creation of the German Empire. That same year, Emperor Pedro II of Brazil included Germany in his first voyage to Europe. He would visit Germany two separate occasions more as Emperor in 1876 and lastly in 1887.

In April 1917 during World War I, Brazil broke diplomatic relations with Germany after the sinking of the Brazilian steamship Paraná by a German submarine. In October 1917, Brazil declared war on the Central Powers after three more Brazilian steamships were hit by German submarines. During the war, Brazil's navy mainly patrolled the Atlantic Ocean and the Brazilian army sent a small military mission to the Western Front.

In August 1942, Brazil declared war on Germany and Italy and entered World War II. Brazilian and German soldiers fought each other during the Italian campaign. Diplomatic relations were resumed between Brazil and West Germany in 1951. That same year, Brazil opened an embassy in Bonn and West Germany opened an embassy in Rio de Janeiro.

In 1964, West German President Heinrich Lübke became the first German head-of-state to pay a visit to Brazil. In 1979, West German Chancellor Helmut Schmidt became the first German head-of-government to visit Brazil. In 1978, Brazilian President Ernesto Geisel paid an official visit to West Germany, the first by a Brazilian President. On 3 October 1990, West Germany and East Germany reunified to a single Germany. In 1991, German Chancellor Helmut Kohl became the first head-of-government to visit Brazil. In 1995, Brazilian President Fernando Henrique Cardoso paid an official visit to Germany. There would be numerous visits between leaders of both nations.

The bilateral relationship between both nations is solid and dense, marked by the convergence of perceptions, values and interests. The German diaspora in Brazil are well integrated in the Brazilian society and maintain strong economic, historical and cultural ties with Germany. The Brazilian community in Germany is distributed throughout the country and consists mainly of Brazilians married to German nationals; employees of German companies with branches in Brazil; Brazilians with dual nationality; and students attending local universities. According to data from the Brazilian consular system, there is approximately 102,000 Brazilians living in Germany.

== High-level visits ==
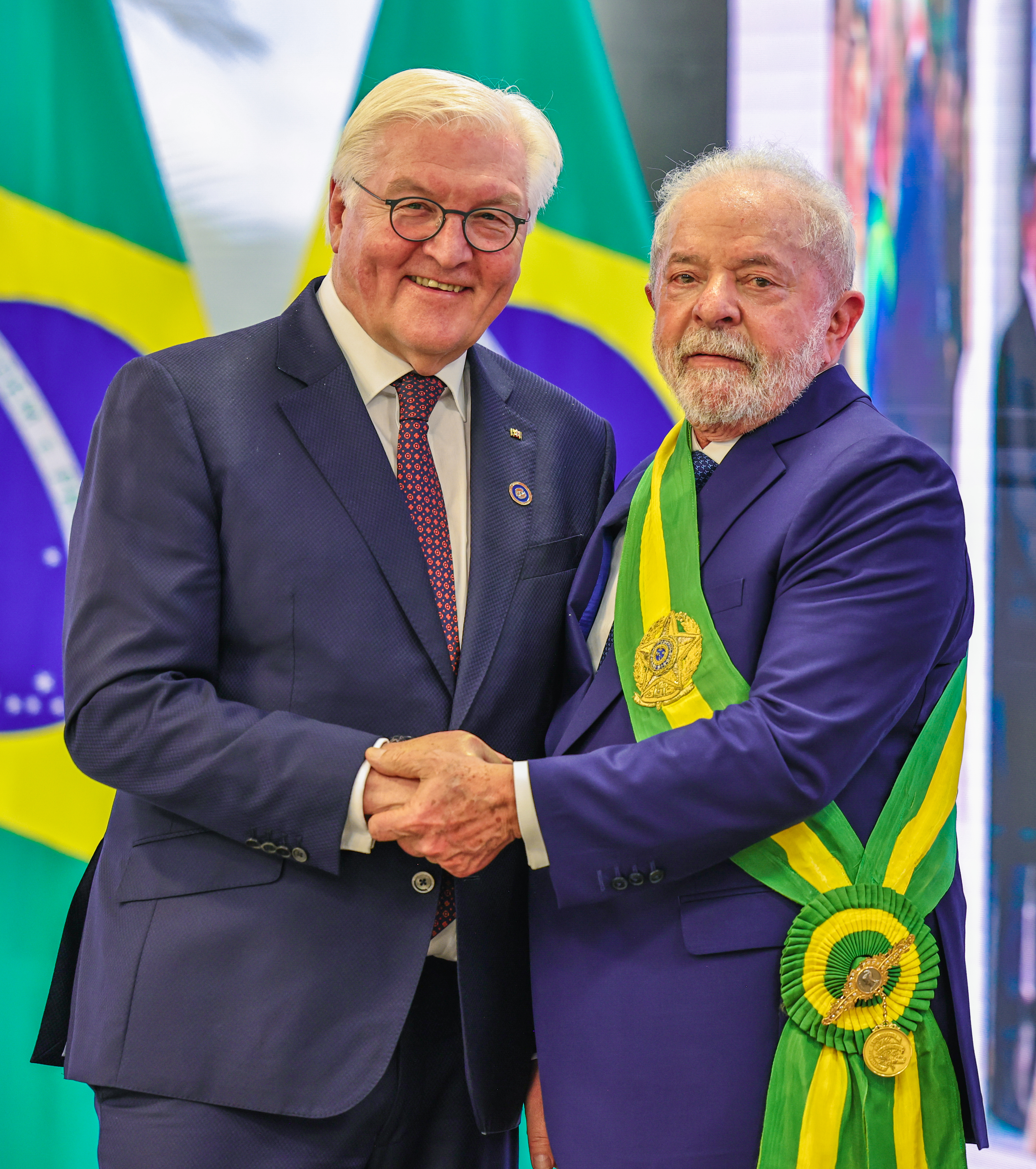
Brazilian President Luiz Inácio Lula da Silva along with German President Frank-Walter Steinmeier during his visit to Brasília in January 2023.

High-level visits from Brazil to Germany

- Emperor Pedro II of Brazil (1871, 1876, 1887)
- President Ernesto Geisel (1978)
- President João Figueiredo (1981)
- President Fernando Henrique Cardoso (1995, 1999)
- President Luiz Inácio Lula da Silva (2003, 2007, 2009, 2023, 2026)
- President Dilma Rousseff (2012)
- Vice President Michel Temer (2012, 2013)

High-level visits from Germany to Brazil

- West German President Heinrich Lübke (1964)
- West German Chancellor Helmut Schmidt (1979)
- Chancellor Helmut Kohl (1991, 1996)
- President Roman Herzog (1995)
- Chancellor Gerhard Schröder (2002)
- President Horst Köhler (2007)
- Chancellor Angela Merkel (2008, 2014, 2015)
- President Christian Wulff (2011)
- President Joachim Gauck (2013)
- President Frank-Walter Steinmeier (2023)

== Bilateral agreements ==
Both nations have signed several bilateral agreements such as a Trade and Navigation Treaty between the Empire of Brazil and the Kingdom of Prussia and between the Empire of Brazil and the Hanseatic cities of Lübeck, Bremen and Hamburg (1827); Cultural Agreement (1969); Space Research Agreement (1973); Agreement for the Joint Commission for Economic Cooperation (COMISTA) (1974); Agreement on Agricultural Cooperation (1974); Agreement of Cooperation for the Peaceful uses of Nuclear Energy (1975); Agreement on the Avoidance of Double Taxation (1975); Basic Technical Cooperation Agreement (1996); Agreement of Cooperation in Scientific Research and Technological Development (1996); Agreements on Financial Cooperation for the Execution of Projects and for the Preservation of Tropical Forests (2002); Agreement on the statute of Cultural Institutions (2005); Agreement on Cinematographic Coproduction (2005); Public Security Partnership and Cooperation Agreement (2008); and an Agreement of Cooperation in the Energy Sector with a Focus on Renewable Energies and Energy Efficiency (2008).

== Resident diplomatic missions ==
Of Brazil

- Berlin (Embassy)
- Frankfurt (Consulate-General)
- Munich (Consulate-General)

Of Germany

- Brasília (Embassy)
- Porto Alegre (Consulate-General)
- Recife (Consulate-General)
- Rio de Janeiro (Consulate-General)
- São Paulo (Consulate-General)

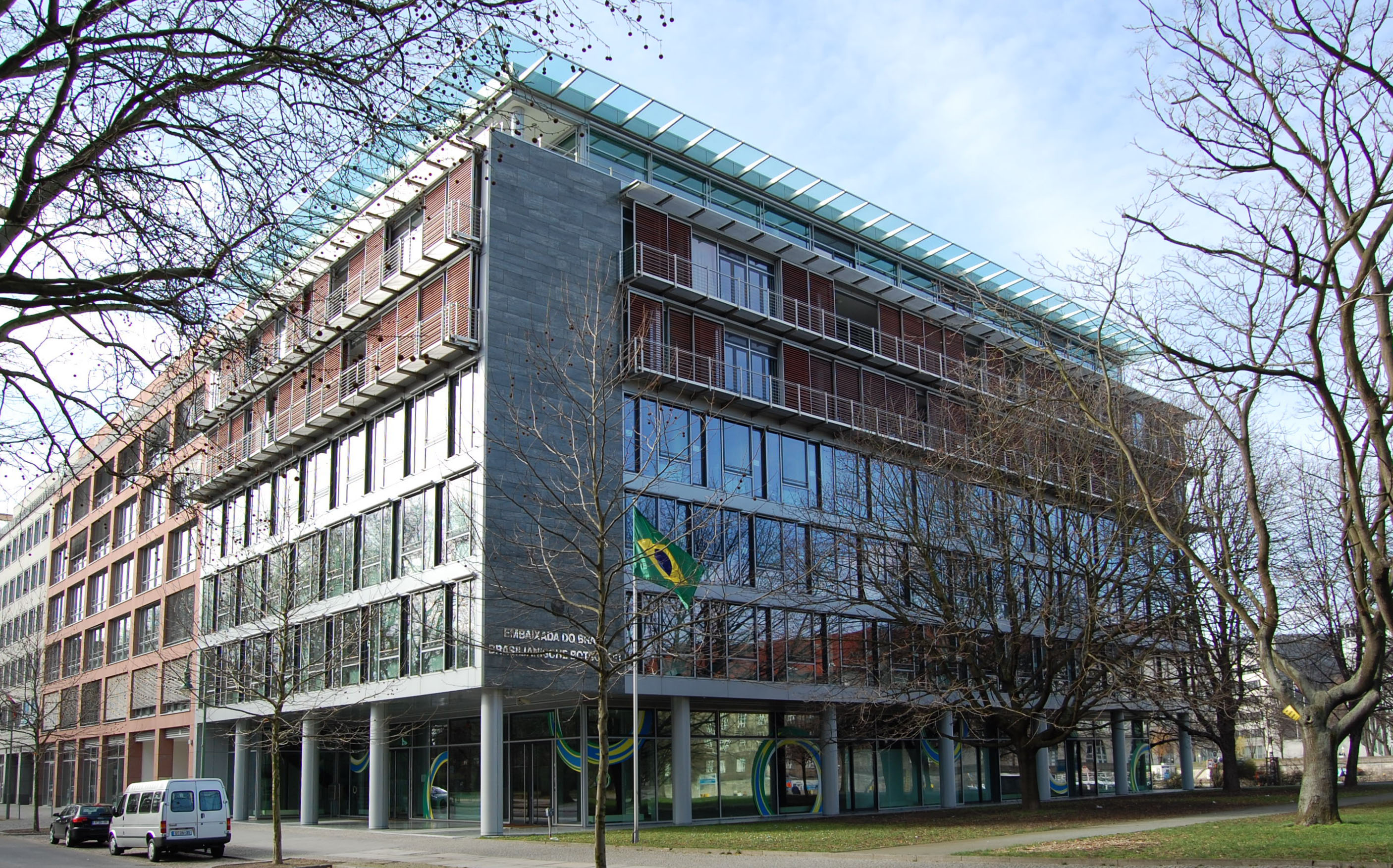
Embassy of Brazil in Berlin

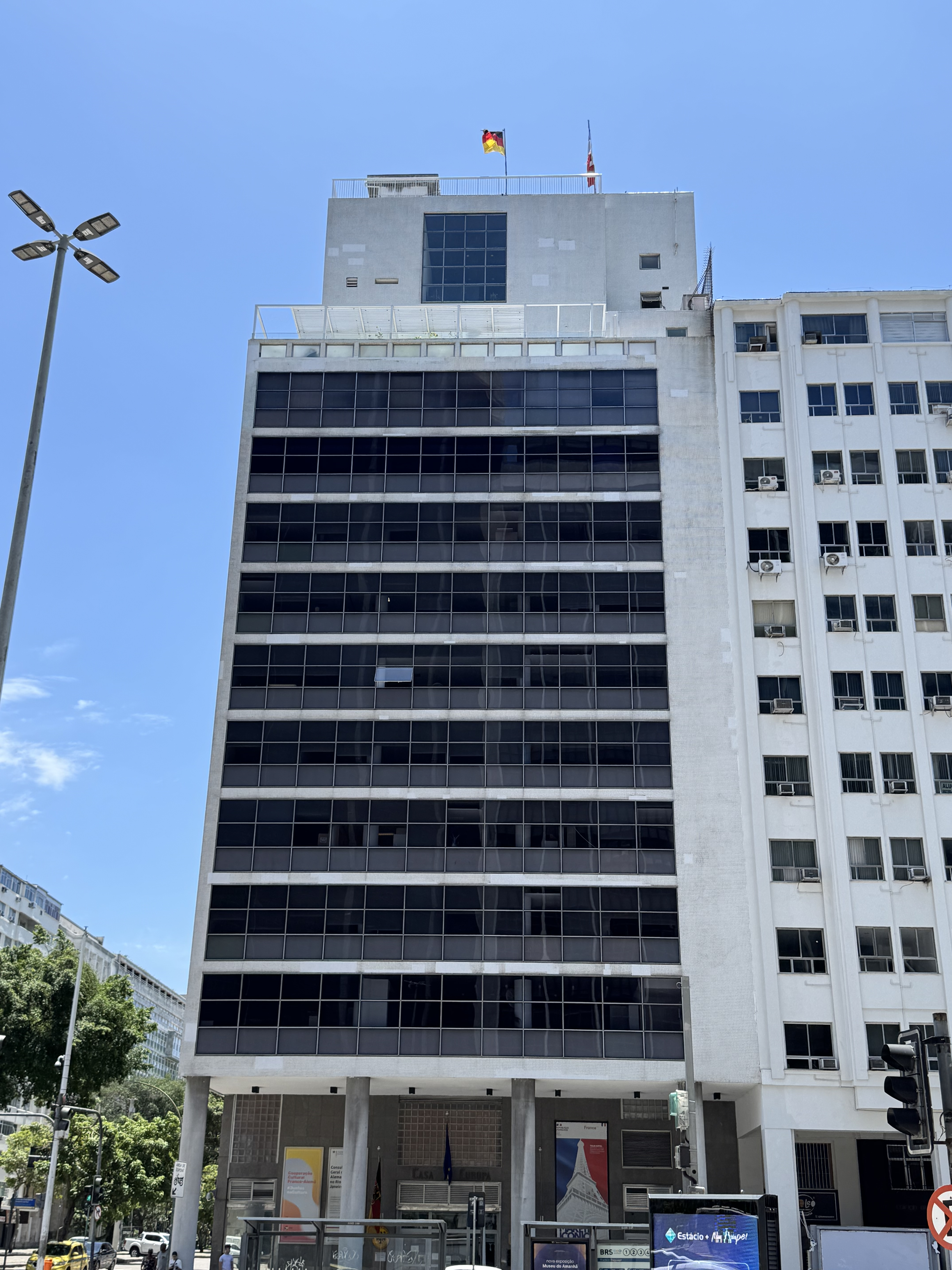
Consulate-General of Germany in Rio de Janeiro

== See also ==
- Brazilians in Germany
- Embassy of Germany, Brasília
- German Brazilians
- Nazism in Brazil
- 2002 FIFA World Cup final
- Brazil v Germany (2014 FIFA World Cup)
