= Brazilian Argentines =

Brasileiros argentinos (Portuguese) Brasileño-argentinos (Spanish)
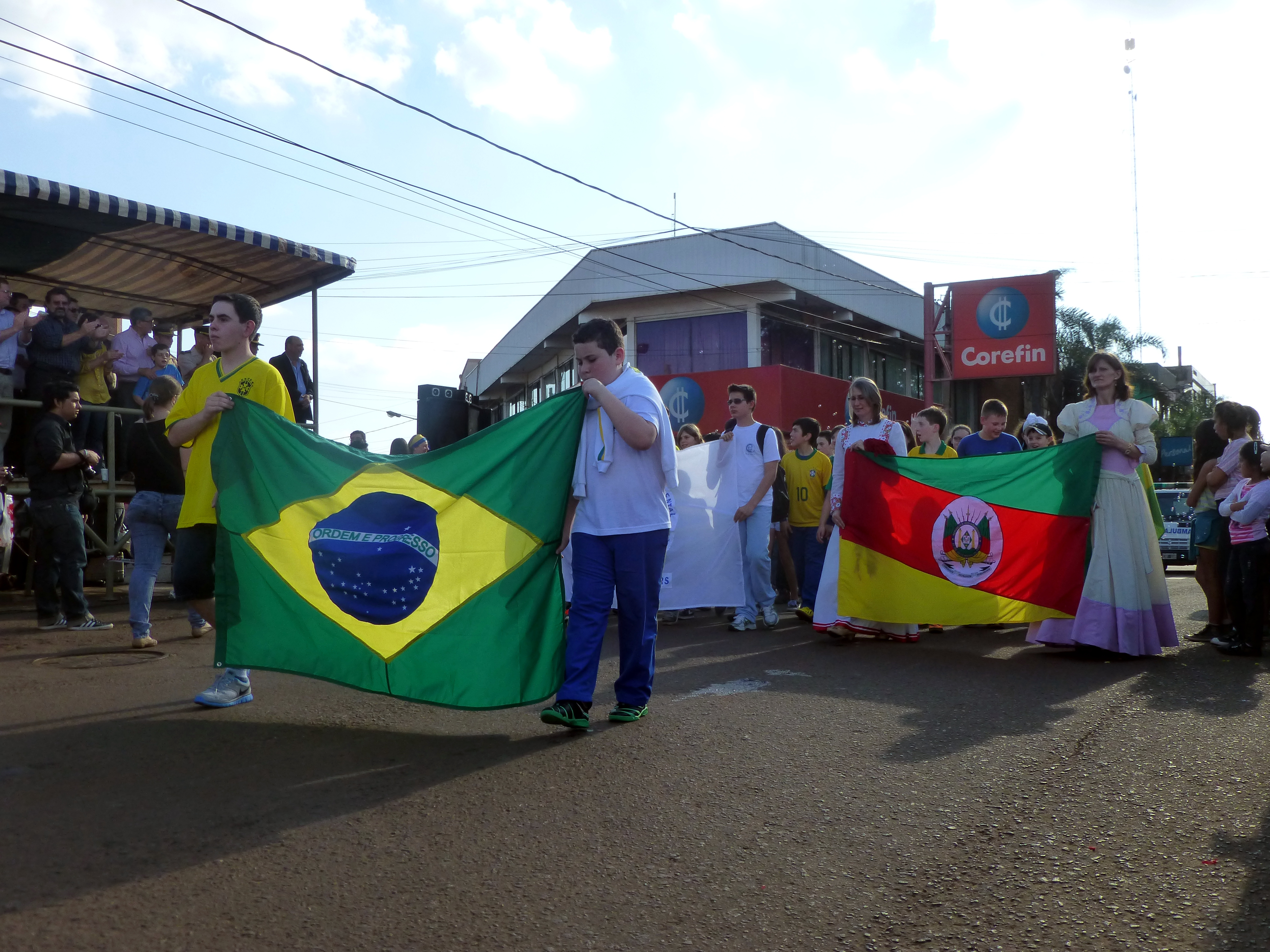
- Members of the Brazilian community during the National Festivity of Immigrants in Oberá, Misiones.

Total population
- 49,943 (by birth, 2022); 76,323 (estimate, 2024); 0.17% of the Argentine population

Regions with significant populations
- Predominantly the Greater Buenos Aires, Misiones Province and Rosario

Languages
- Portuguese; Spanish

Religion
- Roman Catholicism • Evangelicalism • Judaism

Related ethnic groups
- Brasiguayos; Brazilian Uruguayans

Brazilian Argentines (Spanish: brasileño-argentinos) are Argentine citizens of partial or full Brazilian descent, or Brazilian citizens who have migrated to and settled in Argentina.

== Overview ==
Both Argentina and Brazil have historically been countries of immigration, sharing cultural traits and experiences that shaped their national histories. However, this did not translate into a large exchange of citizens between the two countries. According to Brazilian estimates, Argentina has been a relatively minor destination for Brazilian emigrants, well below the Brazilian communities in the United States, Japan and Paraguay, and closer in size to those in Belgium and Canada.

Brazilian immigration to Argentina has historically been intermittent and fluctuating, especially after 1960, with a long-term tendency to decline. By 1914, Brazilians represented 18% of foreigners from neighbouring countries and 0.5% of Argentina's total population; by 1991, these shares had fallen to 4% and 0.1%, respectively. Since at least 1991, however, the Brazilian population in Argentina has grown gradually. Census data recorded 33,966 Brazilians in 1991, 34,712 in 2001 and 41,330 in 2010, an increase of 21.68% over nineteen years. In 2009, Brazil's Ministry of Foreign Affairs estimated the Brazilian community in Argentina at around 49,500 residents.

In recent years, many young Brazilians have moved to Argentina to pursue university studies, particularly medicine, attracted by the lower cost of higher education. However, reports have also noted difficulties related to the cost of living, language barriers and low graduation rates among some Brazilian students in the country.

== History ==
The earliest traces of Brazilian immigration to Argentina date back to the colonial period, when enslaved people from Brazil reached the Río de la Plata region, often fleeing in search of legal conditions that could grant them freedom. Similar geographic and social conditions in the region helped Brazilian migrants adapt quickly.

After independence, relations between the two countries were marked by conflicts and disputes over the status quo in the Southern Cone, limiting migration. Following the end of the Argentine Civil Wars and the consolidation of institutional stability and modernization in Argentina, the country became an attractive destination for immigrants, including Brazilians.

During the 20th century, political and economic instability in both countries prevented a sustained migratory exchange, and many Brazilians preferred to migrate to Europe or North America, particularly the United States. The situation changed after 1991, when the creation of Mercosur encouraged a new process of regional integration. New labour opportunities contributed to a renewed Brazilian migratory flow, including technicians, managers, executives and professionals transferred by companies establishing operations in Argentina.

Brazilian cultural presence in Argentina has also included Afro-Brazilian religions. The first Afro-Brazilian religious temple in Buenos Aires began operating in 1966. By the late 1970s, more than twenty temples practising Umbanda and, to a lesser extent, African-derived religions had been registered with the National Registry of Non-Catholic Religions; their number continued to grow in the following decades.

== Geographic distribution ==
Most Brazilian immigrants in Argentina live in Misiones, Corrientes, the Autonomous City of Buenos Aires, Buenos Aires Province and Santa Fe Province.

In Oberá, Misiones Province, Brazilian residents and their descendants founded the Colectividad Brasileña de Oberá in 1983. The association was formed mainly by families from Rio Grande do Sul, many of whom worked in agriculture. The Brazilian community is represented at the Parque de las Naciones in Oberá, where its house reproduces a colonial residence from northern Brazil during the period of the Empire of Brazil, inspired by the Atlantic coast of Bahia, a region strongly influenced by Portuguese architecture.

== Notable Brazilian Argentines ==
- Antonio Botta (1896–1969), playwright and screenwriter
- Catriel Cabellos (born 2004), footballer
- Margarita Corona (1911–1983), actress
- José Pablo Feinmann (1943–2021), writer and playwright
- Patricia Maldonado (born 1956), writer
- Maruja Montes (1930–1993), actress
- Ryduan Palermo (born 1996), footballer
- Pampita (Carolina Ardohaín Dos Santos, born 1978), model and actress
- Adriana Prieto (1949–1974), actress
- Felipe Rodríguez-Gentile (born 2006), footballer
- Ailín Salas (born 1993), actress
- Wilson Severino (born 1980), footballer
- Aarón Wergifker (1914–1994), footballer

== See also ==
- Argentine Brazilians
- Argentina–Brazil relations
- Argentina–Brazil border
- Immigration to Argentina
