= Brazilian Bolivians =

Brazilians in Bolivia Bolivianos Brasileiros Bolivianos Brasileños
Total population
- 40,000

Regions with significant populations
- La Paz · Cochabamba · Pando · Santa Cruz

Languages
- Brazilian Portuguese · Bolivian Spanish

Religion
- Roman Catholicism

Related ethnic groups
- Brazilian diaspora

Brazilians in Bolivia consists of Bolivian people of Brazilian descent as well as immigrants and expatriates from Brazil. As of 2020, an estimated 40,000 Brazilians live in Bolivia.

== History ==
In the late 1980s, farmers from Brazil became attracted to Bolivia's undeveloped flat land, which has fertile soil, plentiful water and a tropical climate, which is perfect for crops such as soy, corn, sunflowers, rice and, wheat. Many of them settled in the Bolivian department of Pando, which is just across the border from the Brazilian Amazon states of Acre and Rondônia. There are also Brazilian farmers in the Bolivian department of Santa Cruz who owned farmlands there as well.

Many Brazilian students have been coming to Bolivia to study medicine. There are about 3,000 Brazilian students in the country, most of them enrolled in a medical course. The first Brazilian students arrived in Bolivia in the 1980s. They were attracted by the medical courses with low costs and without the requirement for college.

== Discrimination ==
Thousands of Brazilians who live on Bolivian territory near the border with Brazil are suffering the threat of banishment because Bolivian President Evo Morales, under the claim of guaranteeing his country sovereignty, wants to settle 4,000 peasant families from La Paz and Cochabamba, onto 200,000 hectares located in the bordering region.

In 2009, the Bolivian government had banished about 4,000 Brazilian rural workers, rubber tappers and farmers from the Pando department. The first people who have been expelled from the Pando department were poor Brazilian settlers' families. Some settlers have been forced to leave their homes and land, whereas others have been threatened to set fire to their possessions before handing them over to the Bolivians.

There is also discrimination against Brazilian students by the authorities and the population of Bolivia with claims of bias, demands for HIV tests and charging excessive fees and paperwork. Representatives of the Bolivian government said the presence of young Brazilians significantly affected the culture of the cities where they stayed mainly Cochabamba and Santa Cruz de la Sierra. For many Bolivians, Brazilians promote more parties and have a bohemian behavior.

== Notable people ==
- Sandro Coelho - Brazilian football midfielder
- Edivaldo Hermoza - Brazilian-born Bolivian footballer
- Marcelo Martins Moreno - Bolivian footballer
- Olivia Pinheiro - Bolivian beauty pageant titleholder and model
- Regis de Souza - Brazilian footballer

== See also ==
- Bolivia–Brazil relations
- Brazilian diaspora
- Immigration to Bolivia
- Bolivians in Brazil
- Republic of Acre
