= Bolivia–Brazil relations =

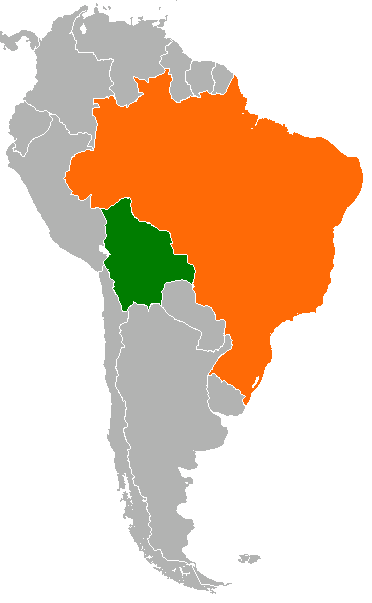
- Bolivia: Brazil

Bolivia–Brazil relations are the bilateral relations between Bolivia and Brazil. Both countries are members of the Latin American Integration Association, Organization of American States and United Nations.

== Resident diplomatic missions ==
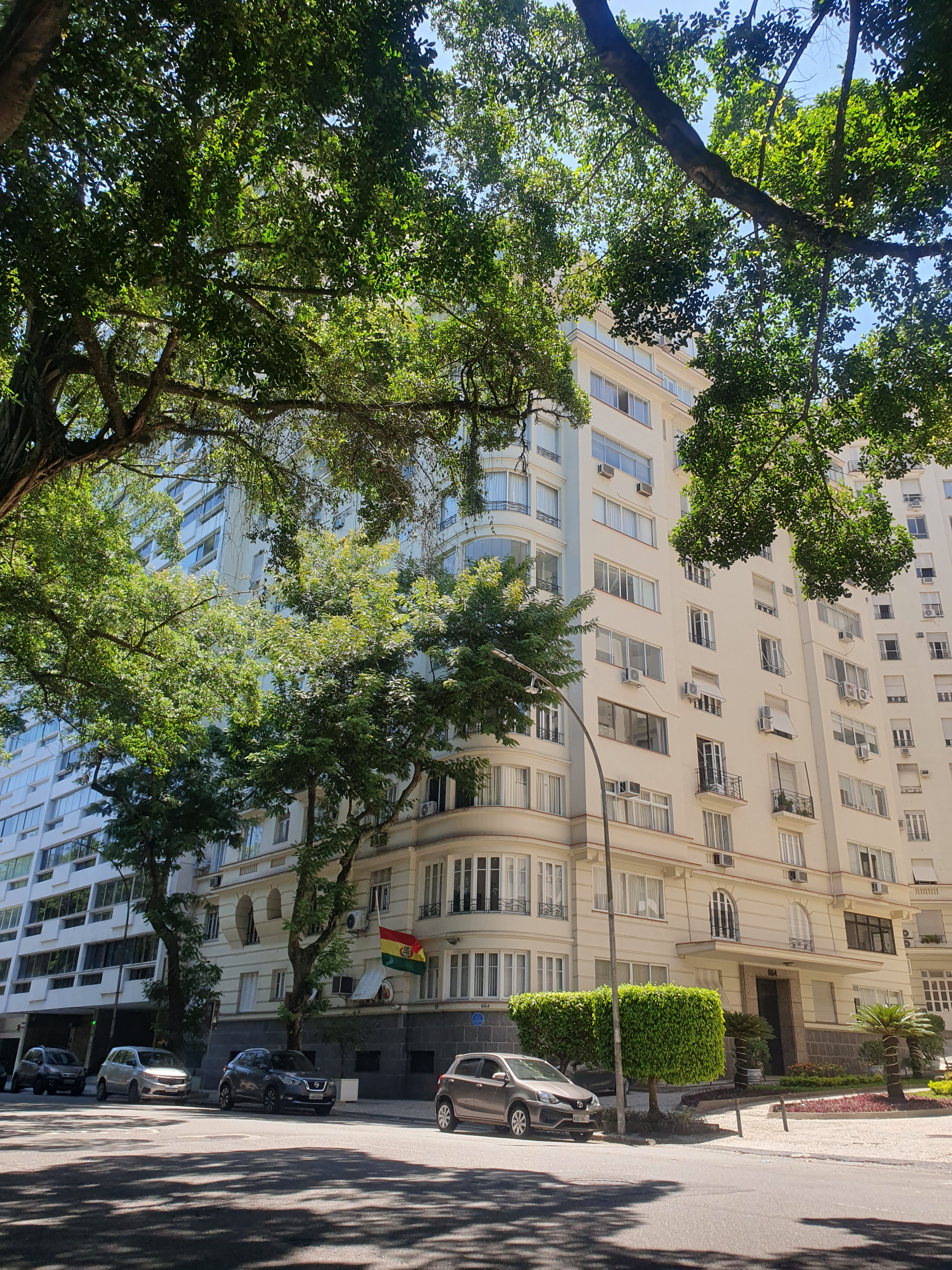
Building hosting the Consulate-General of Bolivia in Rio de Janeiro

Of Bolivia

- Brasília (Embassy)
- Rio de Janeiro (Consulate-General)
- São Paulo (Consulate-General)
- Cáceres (Consulate)
- Corumbá (Consulate)
- Epitaciolândia (Consulate)
- Guajará-Mirim (Consulate)

Of Brazil

- La Paz (Embassy)
- Cochabamba (Consulate-General)
- Santa Cruz de la Sierra (Consulate-General)
- Cobija (Consulate)
- Guayaramerín (Consulate)
- Puerto Quijarro (Consulate)

== See also ==
- Acre War
- Bolivia–Brazil border
- Foreign relations of Bolivia
- Foreign relations of Brazil
- Treaty of Ayacucho
- Treaty of Petrópolis
