= 1975 Brazil–West Germany nuclear agreement =

Nuclear Treaty

Agreement of Cooperation in the Peaceful Use of Nuclear Energy
- Signed: June 27, 1975
- Location: Bonn, West Germany
- Signatories: Azeredo da Silveira; Hans-Dietrich Genscher
- Parties: Brazil; West Germany

The 1975 Brazil–West Germany nuclear agreement is a treaty between Brazil and West Germany signed on June 27, 1975.

== Negotiations ==
The first round of negotiations were conducted trilaterally between Brazil, West Germany, and France.

In April 1975, the United States sent a four-person delegation to the negotiations to lobby for safeguards to prevent Brazil using the technology or plutonium to make nuclear weapons.

The agreement was signed by foreign ministers Azeredo da Silveira and Hans-Dietrich Genscher on June 27, 1975, in Bonn, West Germany.

== Reactions ==
During a visit to West Germany in 1977, Vice President of the United States Walter Mondale lobbied the West German government to withdraw from the deal.

=== Brazil ===
The Brazilian Physical Society issued a statement that disagreed with the premise that Brazil required a nuclear program of that magnitude, given its vast hydroelectric capacity.
