= Brazilians in Germany =

Ethnic group in Germany

- Distribution of Brazilian citizens in Germany (2021)

Total population
- 144,120 (2020)

Regions with significant populations
- Berlin · Coburg · Munich • Frankfurt

Languages
- Portuguese; German

Religion
- Roman Catholicism · Lutheranism · Judaism

Related ethnic groups
- Brazilian diaspora

Brazilians in Germany (Portuguese: Brasileiros na Alemanha) consist mainly of immigrants and expatriates from Brazil as well as their locally born descendants. Many of them consist of German Brazilian returnees. According to Brazil's foreign relations department, there are about 144,120 Brazilians living in Germany.

== Migration history ==
A wave of Brazilian immigrants coming to Germany began in the early 1990s with the potent combination of a crashing Brazilian economy, rampant corruption and cheaper air fares.

Many German Brazilians migrated to Germany to search for their own roots. The Martius-Staden Institute in Panamby, São Paulo is the first stop for Brazilians researching their German ancestors. The institute's archive has an extensive index of family names of German origin. In addition, many of Brazil's LGBT community chose to migrate to Germany due to the country's liberal attitude toward gays and many Brazilian artists consider working in Germany more prestigious than in Brazil.

== Culture ==
Elements of Brazilian culture can be seen in many of Germany's major cities. Small shops have begun to carry Brazilian specialties like manioc flour and guaraná soda. The caipirinha, Brazil's national drink, is now Germany's national cocktail and Germany has become the top importer of cachaça. Samba and capoeira are also flourishing in Germany. Brazilian-Portuguese language church services can also be found in most major cities.

There are numerous organizations, and societies have formed in Germany. These include the Forum Brasil in Berlin, the German-Brazilian Cultural Society in Coburg and the Casa do Brasil in Munich.

== See also ==
- Brazil–Germany relations
- German Brazilian
