= Corumbá =

- Municipality
- Municipality of Corumbá
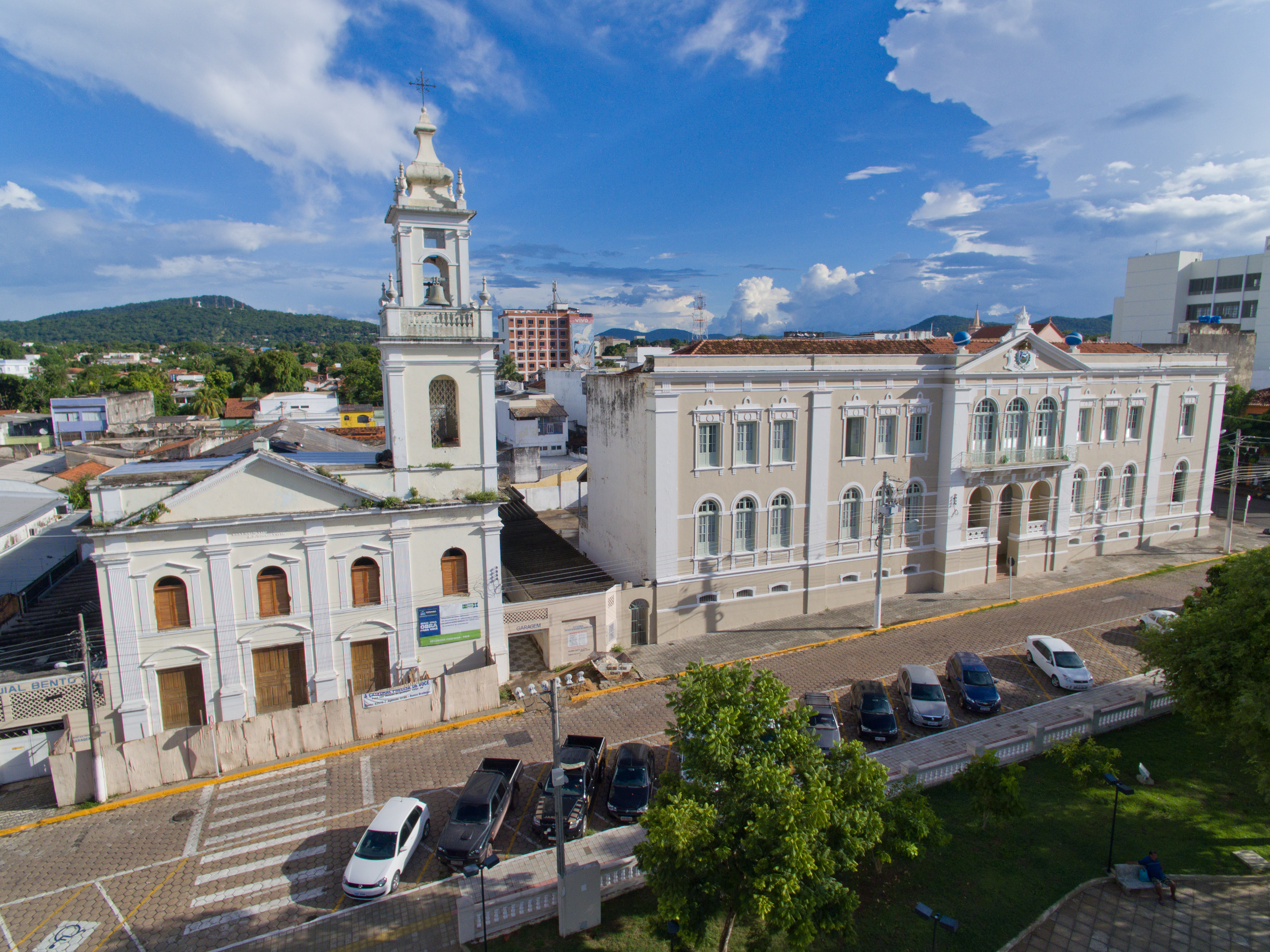
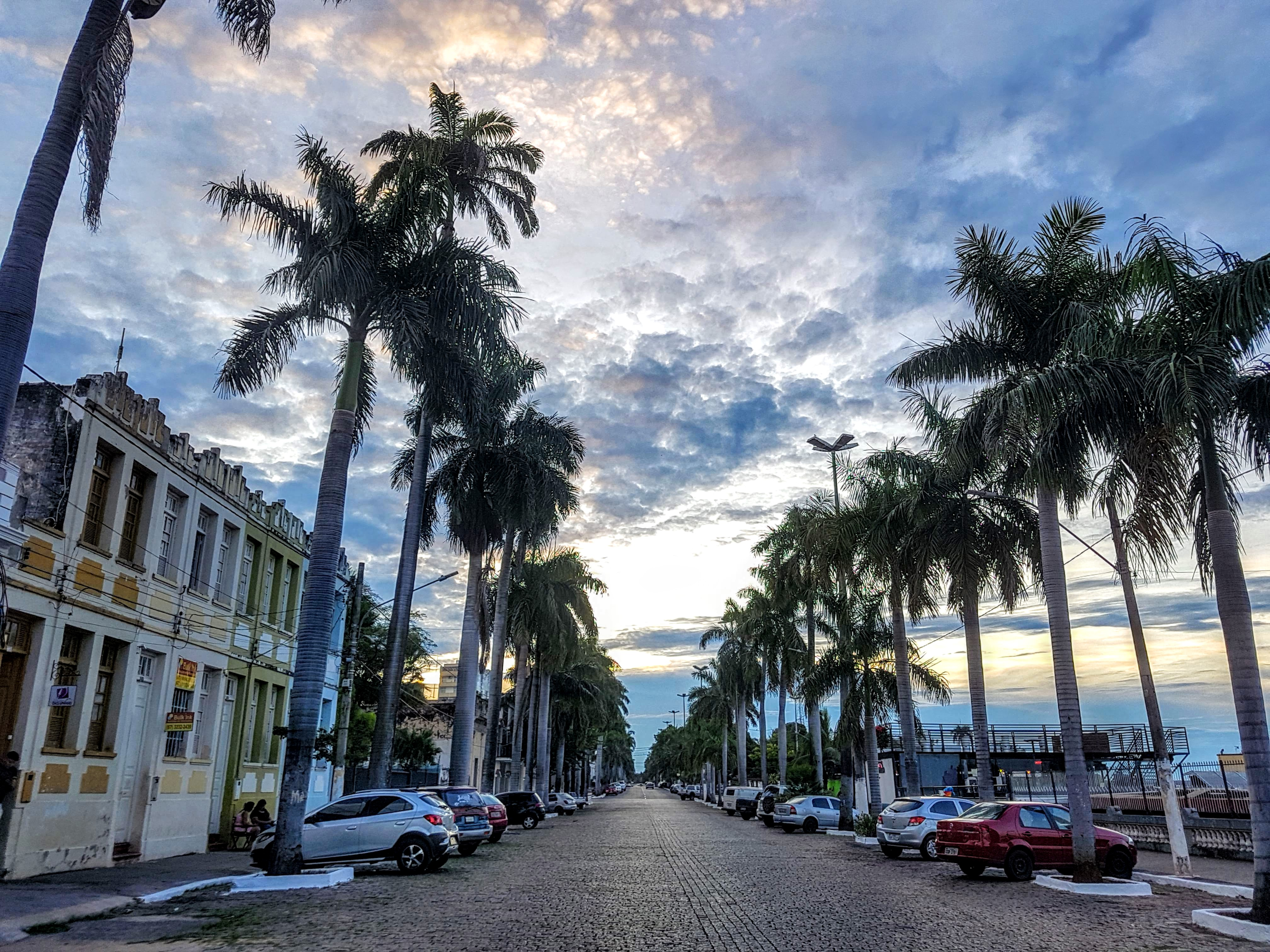
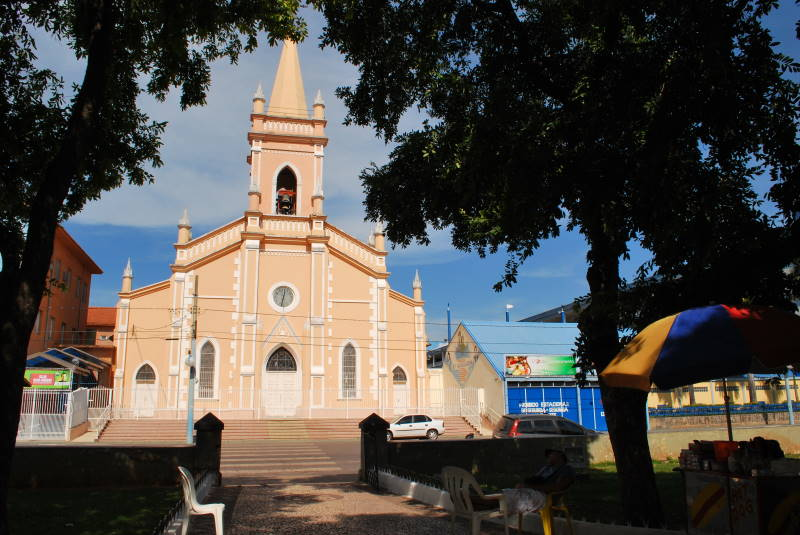
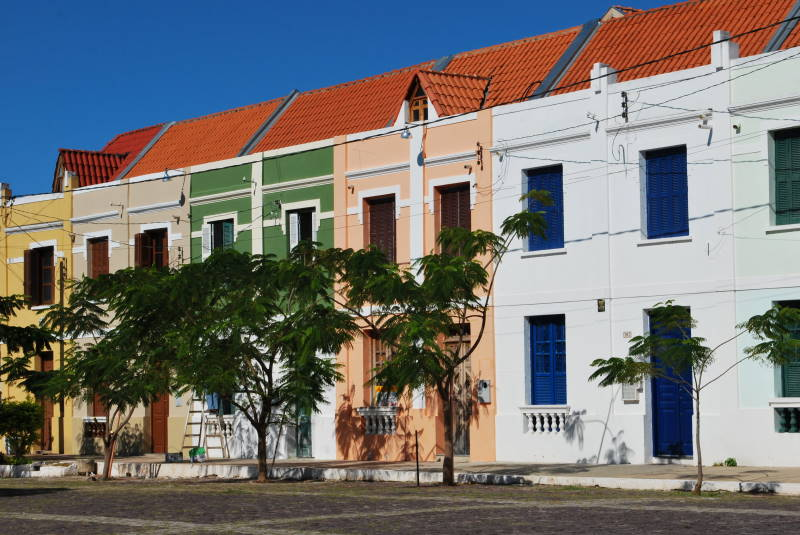

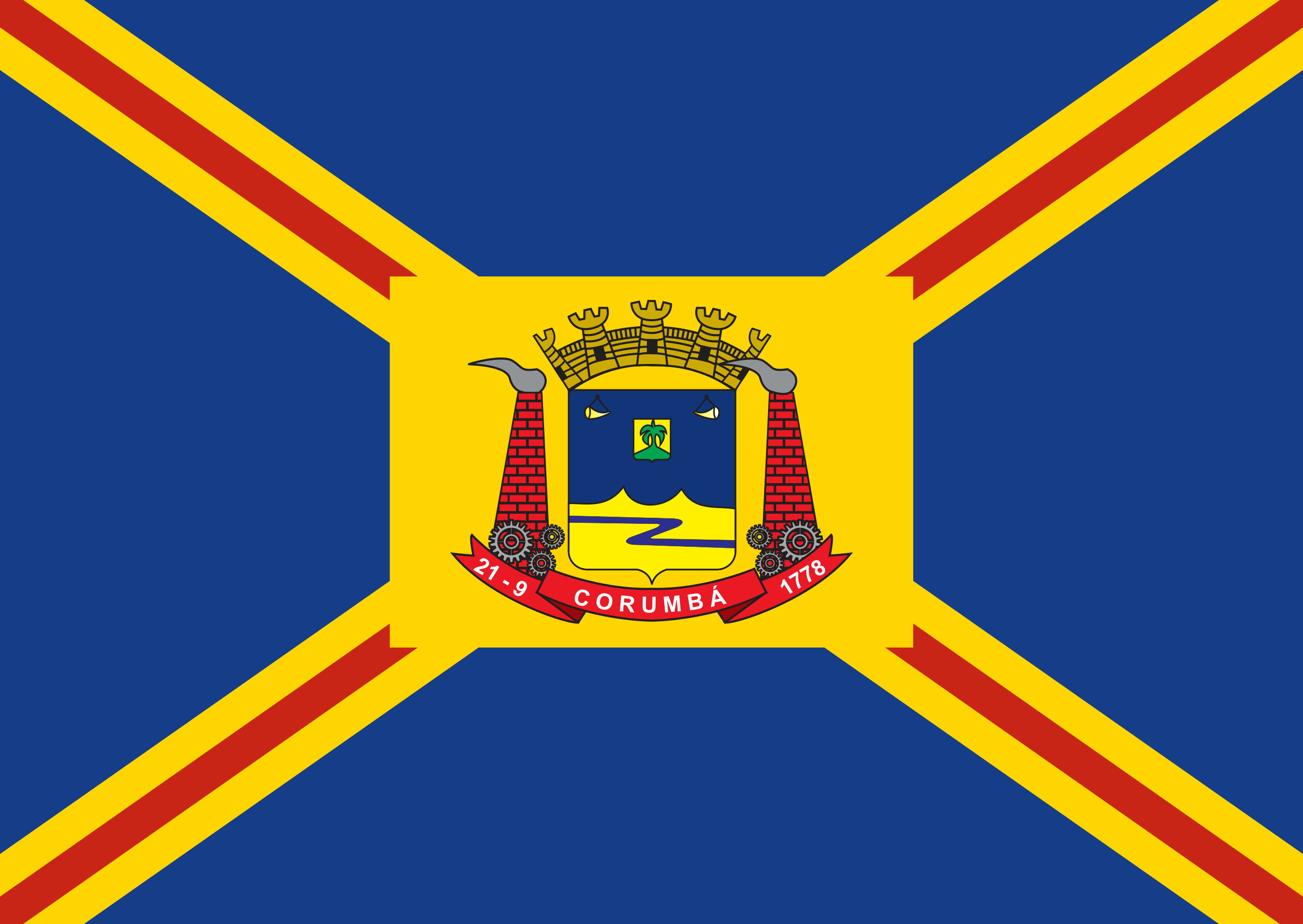
- Flag Coat of arms

- Location in Mato Grosso do Sul
- Coordinates: 19°00′32″S 57°39′10″W
- Country: Brazil
- Region: Center-West
- State: Mato Grosso do Sul
- Founded: 1778

Government
  - Mayor: Gabriel Alves de Oliveira

Area
  - Total: 64,960 km^{2} (25,080 sq mi)
- Elevation: 118 m (387 ft)

Population (2026)
  - Total: 96,334
  - Density: 1.483/km^{2} (3.841/sq mi)
- Time zone: UTC−4 (AMT)
- HDI (2010): 0.700 – high
- Website: corumba.ms.gov.br

Corumbá (Portuguese pronunciation: [koɾũˈba]) is a municipality in the Brazilian state of Mato Grosso do Sul, 425 km northwest of Campo Grande, the state's capital. It has a population of approximately 96,334 inhabitants, and its economy is based mainly on agriculture, animal husbandry, mineral extraction, and tourism, being the gateway to the biggest wetlands of the world, the Pantanal. Due to its border with Bolivia, Bolivians in Brazil constitute a significant portion of the city's population, forming a distinct cultural community. The city is served by Corumbá International Airport.

Corumbá is the westernmost and northernmost city in Mato Gosso do Sul, and it is by far the largest municipality by area in that state, composing 18% of its territory. It is also the eleventh largest municipality in Brazil and the largest outside Amazonas and Pará. The territory of Corumbá has an enclaved municipality within it: Ladário.

On September 20, 2021, the record high temperature of 43.9 °C (111.0 °F) was registered. On June 22, 1933, the record low temperature of 0.8 °C (33.4 °F) was recorded.

== History ==
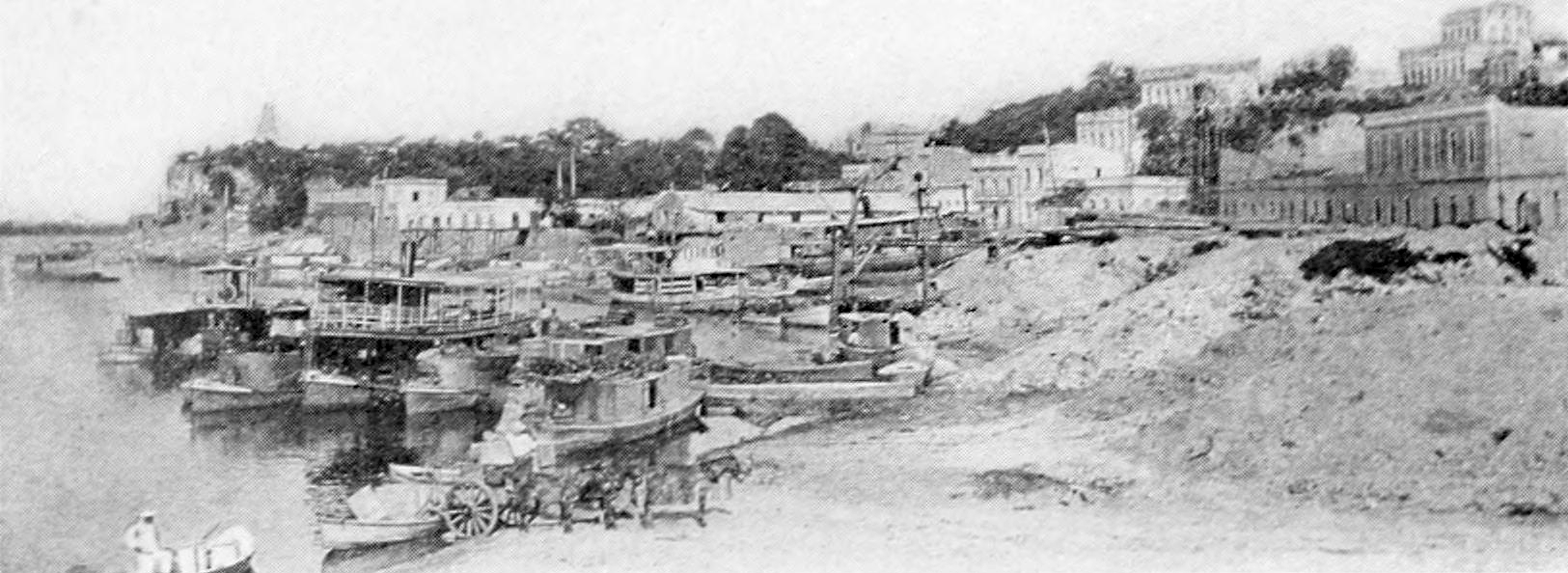
Corumbá, 1916

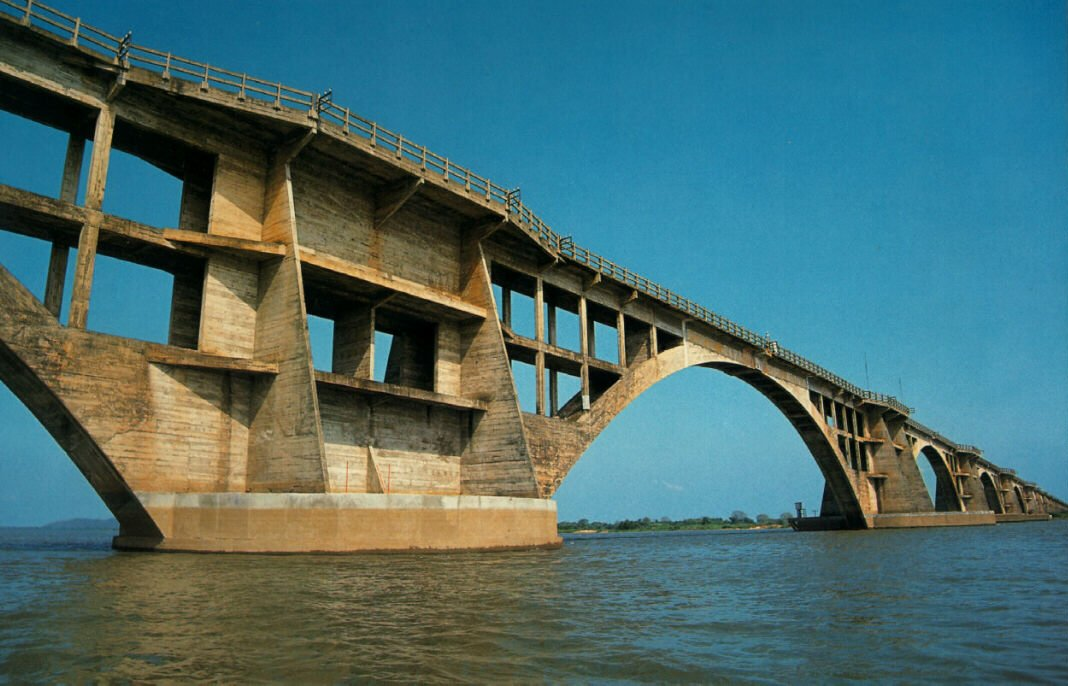
Bridge Rio Branco in Corumbá

Founded as a military outpost and colony in 1778 by the Spanish. It became strategically important with the opening of the Paraguay River to international trade after the Paraguayan War (1865–70). Nearby are the buttes of Mt Urucum, which contain vast mineral deposits. In 1878 it was raised to the category of city.

In 1938, the governments of Brazil and Bolivia agreed to begin construction on the Santa Cruz-Corumbá Railway, a section of the General Manuel Belgrano Railway that connected Santa Cruz de la Sierra, Bolivia with the Brazilian state of Mato Grosso. The railway was finished in 1955.

== Pantanal ==
The ecoregion Pantanal is the most important plain of all humid areas in South America. Its large territory meets in the Mato Grosso do Sul, is known as South Pantanal and the city of Corumbá serves as its entrance door. The Pantanal of Mato Grosso do Sul is recognized as one of the most exuberant and diversified natural reserves on the planet.

The great diversity of the fauna is its: caiman, anacondas, fish, capybaras, tapirs, hyacinth macaws, herons, and jabiru storks, among others. The Pantanal received the recognition as National Patrimony in the Constitution of 1988 and as Patrimony of the Humanity and Reserve of the Biosfera from UNESCO.

According to World Wide Fund for Nature (1999), there exist in the Pantanal 650 species of birds, 80 of mammals, 260 of fish and 50 of reptiles. It is a region of great importance for preservation of biodiversity, considered one of the biggest centers of reproduction of fauna of America. Already more than 263 species of fish, 122 species of mammals, 93 species of reptiles, 1,132 species of butterflies, 656 species of birds and 1,700 species of plants have been cataloged there.

== Relations with Bolivia ==
The municipality of Corumbá is bordered simultaneously by Bolivia and Paraguay, a situation that is known as tríplice border. Its urban area borders on the Bolivian cities of Puerto Suárez and Puerto Quijarro, which together make up a Free Zone for purchases of imported products and Bolivian crafts, the limit of which is the end of Ramon Gomes Road. The border with Paraguay is at the south extremity of the municipality in the agricultural zone. As of 2014, Bolivians are asked to prove if they have over the equivalent of $800 to receive a temporary visa.

As a result, Corumbá has one of the highest proportions of Bolivian-Brazilians of any city. Ethnographic reports have found that Bolivians in the city are regularly subject to racial discrimination.

== Urbanization and demographic information ==
Corumbá consists of two areas. The lower area is where the old village of notable architecture lies, close to the port. The upper area, newer and much bigger, is chessboard-shaped. Its architecture is not like other old Brazilian cities, where the predominant architectural style is the colonial romantic Portuguese. Its architecture is Italian neoclassical, the same as central Asunción, the old suburbs of Buenos Aires, the towns of the countryside of the Uruguay, and the majority of the southwestern Rio Grande do Sul.

Its urbanization rate is very high, reaching around 90%. In recent years, due to a better quality of life, the population is aging and the fertility rate is decreasing.

Population growth
1970	48,600
1980	67,500
1991	88,360
1993	89,585
1996	89,083
2000	95,700
2004	99,441
2005	100,268
2006	101,089
2010	103,772
2013	107,347
2018	110,806

As of the 2010 census, there were 103,772 people living in Corumbá. The racial composition of the city was:

Color/Race	Number	Percentage
Mixed	65,685	63.34%
White	29,000	27.96%
Black	7,367	7.10%
Asian	1,252	1.21%
Indigenous	398	0.38%

== Consular representation ==
Bolivia has a Consulate in Corumbá.

== Sister cities ==
- Várzea Grande, Brazil
- Pisa, Italy
- Dunkirk, France

== Climate ==
Climate data for Corumbá (1981–2010)
Month	Jan	Feb	Mar	Apr	May	Jun	Jul	Aug	Sep	Oct	Nov	Dec	Year
Mean daily maximum °C (°F)	33.7 (92.7)	33.3 (91.9)	33.0 (91.4)	31.8 (89.2)	28.9 (84.0)	28.0 (82.4)	28.6 (83.5)	30.5 (86.9)	32.3 (90.1)	34.1 (93.4)	34.0 (93.2)	34.2 (93.6)	31.9 (89.4)
Daily mean °C (°F)	27.9 (82.2)	27.5 (81.5)	27.2 (81.0)	25.9 (78.6)	23.3 (73.9)	22.1 (71.8)	22.0 (71.6)	23.8 (74.8)	25.6 (78.1)	27.5 (81.5)	27.7 (81.9)	27.9 (82.2)	25.7 (78.3)
Mean daily minimum °C (°F)	23.8 (74.8)	23.7 (74.7)	23.6 (74.5)	21.8 (71.2)	19.2 (66.6)	17.9 (64.2)	17.5 (63.5)	18.8 (65.8)	20.6 (69.1)	22.8 (73.0)	23.1 (73.6)	23.4 (74.1)	21.4 (70.5)
Average precipitation mm (inches)	155.3 (6.11)	134.3 (5.29)	126.5 (4.98)	65.7 (2.59)	50.3 (1.98)	17.3 (0.68)	23.1 (0.91)	26.9 (1.06)	40.4 (1.59)	86.2 (3.39)	117.5 (4.63)	154.5 (6.08)	998.0 (39.29)
Average precipitation days (≥ 1.0 mm)	12	10	10	6	4	2	2	2	4	7	8	10	77
Mean monthly sunshine hours	210.4	185.3	203.9	220.4	212.7	204.2	235.6	201.0	187.5	217.5	216.0	234.1	2,528.6
Source: Instituto Nacional de Meteorologia

Climate data for Nhecolândia (Nhumirim) (1981–2010)
Month	Jan	Feb	Mar	Apr	May	Jun	Jul	Aug	Sep	Oct	Nov	Dec	Year
Mean daily maximum °C (°F)	33.3 (91.9)	33.0 (91.4)	33.3 (91.9)	32.4 (90.3)	29.7 (85.5)	29.1 (84.4)	29.8 (85.6)	32.3 (90.1)	33.1 (91.6)	34.2 (93.6)	34.1 (93.4)	33.6 (92.5)	32.3 (90.1)
Daily mean °C (°F)	27.6 (81.7)	27.5 (81.5)	27.2 (81.0)	25.5 (77.9)	22.3 (72.1)	21.2 (70.2)	20.8 (69.4)	22.6 (72.7)	24.7 (76.5)	27.0 (80.6)	27.3 (81.1)	27.6 (81.7)	25.1 (77.2)
Mean daily minimum °C (°F)	23.4 (74.1)	23.4 (74.1)	22.8 (73.0)	20.6 (69.1)	16.8 (62.2)	15.5 (59.9)	14.2 (57.6)	15.4 (59.7)	18.3 (64.9)	21.5 (70.7)	21.8 (71.2)	22.8 (73.0)	19.7 (67.5)
Average precipitation mm (inches)	172.8 (6.80)	142.1 (5.59)	128.9 (5.07)	68.2 (2.69)	55.8 (2.20)	17.2 (0.68)	10.2 (0.40)	17.5 (0.69)	33.8 (1.33)	100.7 (3.96)	135.9 (5.35)	163.1 (6.42)	1,046.2 (41.19)
Average precipitation days (≥ 1.0 mm)	11	10	9	5	4	2	2	2	2	6	8	9	70
Average relative humidity (%)	82.4	83.7	84.8	82.3	81.9	81.5	76.6	70.7	69.0	73.5	75.7	79.4	78.5
Mean monthly sunshine hours	189.2	177.4	210.0	225.9	211.4	212.2	230.6	222.0	177.7	201.1	213.8	206.6	2,477.9
Source: Instituto Nacional de Meteorologia
