= History of the Jews in Brazil =

Brazilian Jews
Judeus brasileiros יְהוּדִים ברזילאים
- The location of Brazil in South America

Total population
- 107,329–120,000 Jewish Brazilians

Regions with significant populations
- Brazil: Mainly in the cities of São Paulo, Rio de Janeiro and Porto Alegre.

Languages
- Brazilian Portuguese · Hebrew · Yiddish · Ladino

Religion
- Judaism

Related ethnic groups
- Brazilian people, Sephardi Jews, Mizrahi Jews and Ashkenazi Jews

The history of the Jews in Brazil begins during the settlement of Europeans in the new world. Although only baptized Christians were subject to the Inquisition, Jews started settling in Brazil when the Inquisition reached Portugal, in the 16th century. They arrived in Brazil during the period of Dutch rule, setting up in Recife the first synagogue in the Americas, the Kahal Zur Israel Synagogue, as early as 1636. Most of those Jews were Sephardic Jews who had fled the Inquisition in Spain and Portugal to the religious freedom of the Netherlands.

The Portuguese Inquisition expanded its scope of operations from Portugal to Portugal's colonial possessions, including Brazil, Cape Verde, and Goa, where it continued investigating and trying cases based on supposed breaches of orthodox Roman Catholicism until 1821. As a colony of Portugal, Brazil was affected by the nearly 300 years of repression of the Portuguese Inquisition, which began in 1536.

In The Wealth of Nations Adam Smith attributed much of the development of Brazil's sugar industry and cultivation to the arrival of Portuguese Jews who were forced out of Portugal during the Inquisition.

After the first Brazilian Constitution in 1824 that granted freedom of religion, Jews began to arrive gradually in Brazil. Many Moroccan Jews arrived in the 19th century, principally because of the rubber boom, settling in the Amazon basin, where many of their descendants continue to live. Waves of Jewish immigration occurred first by Russian and Polish Jews escaping pogroms and the Russian Revolution, and then German Jews in the 1930s during the rise of the Nazis in Europe. In the late 1950s, another wave of immigration brought thousands of North African Jews. By the 21st Century the Jewish communities were thriving in Brazil. Some antisemitic events and acts have occurred, mainly during the 2006 Lebanon War such as vandalism of Jewish cemeteries. But in the main, Brazil's Jewish population is highly educated, with 68% of the community holding university degrees, employed mainly in business, law, medicine, engineering, and the arts. Most own businesses or are self-employed. The IBGE Census shows that 70% of Brazil's Jews belong to the middle and upper classes. As a group, Jews in Brazil see themselves as a successful segment of society, and face relatively little antisemitism at the onset of the 21st century.

Brazil has the tenth largest Jewish community in the world, about 107,329 by 2010, according to the Brazilian Institute of Geography and Statistics (IBGE) Census, and has the second largest Jewish population in Latin America, after Argentina. The Jewish Confederation of Brazil (CONIB) estimates that there are more than 120,000 Jews in Brazil.

== First Jewish arrivals ==
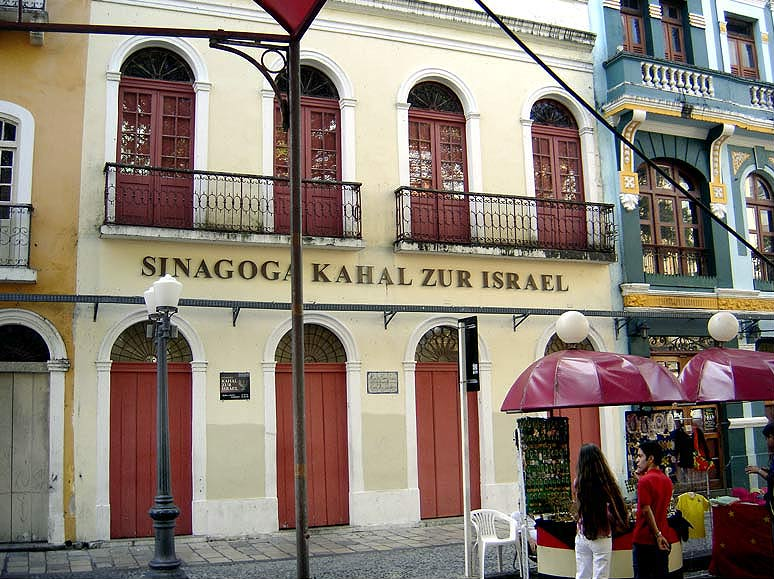
The oldest synagogue in the Americas, Kahal Zur Israel Synagogue, located in Recife

The Portuguese Jews, persecuted by the inquisition, stript of their fortunes, and banished to Brazil, introduced, by their example, some sort of order and industry among the transported felons and strumpets by whom that colony was originally peopled, and taught them the culture of the sugar-cane. Upon all these different occasions, it was not the wisdom and policy, but the disorder and injustice of the European governments, which peopled and cultivated America.

—Adam Smith, The Wealth of Nations (1776)

There have been Jews in what is now Brazil since the first Portuguese arrived in the country in 1500, notably Mestre João and Gaspar da Gama who arrived in the first ships. A number of Sephardic Jews immigrated to Brazil during its early settlements. They were known as "New Christians" - Conversos (pt.) or Marranos (sp.) — Jews obliged to convert to Roman Catholicism by the Portuguese crown.

The Jews from Portugal avoided immigrating to Brazil, because they would also be persecuted by the Inquisition. Most of the Portuguese Conversos took refuge in Mediterranean countries such as in North Africa, Italy, Greece and the Middle East, and others emigrated to countries that tolerated Judaism, such as the Netherlands, England and Germany. Many Sephardic Jews from Holland and England worked with the maritime trade of the Dutch West India Company, especially with the sugar production in the northeast of Brazil.

The first Jews who arrived in South America were Sephardic Jews who, after being expelled from Brazil by the Portuguese, settled in the northeast Dutch colony. Kahal Zur Israel Synagogue was the first synagogue in the Americas, established in Recife in 1636 and a community of about 1450 Sephardic Jews lived there. When the Portuguese retook Recife in 1654, 23 Jews from the community escaped to the Dutch North American colony of New Amsterdam, that in 1664 would become New York City.

In the final decades of the 18th century, some Conversos came to southeastern Brazil to work in the gold mines. Many were arrested, accused of Judaism. Brazilian families that descend from the Conversos are mainly concentrated in the states of Minas Gerais, Rio de Janeiro, Pará and Bahia.

Most sources state that the first synagogue of Belém, Sha'ar haShamaim ("Gate of Heaven"), was founded in 1824. There are, however, controversies; Samuel Benchimol, author of Eretz Amazônia: Os Judeus na Amazônia, affirms that the first synagogue in Belém was Eshel Avraham ("Abraham's Tamarisk") and that it was established in 1823 or 1824, while Sha'ar haShamaim was founded in 1826 or 1828.

The Jewish population in the capital of Grão-Pará had by 1842 an established necropolis.

== Agricultural settlements ==
Because of unfavorable conditions in Europe, European Jews began debating in the 1890s about establishing agricultural settlements in Brazil. At first, the plan did not work because of Brazilian political quarrels.

In 1904, the Jewish agricultural colonization, supported by the Jewish Colonization Association, began in the state of Rio Grande do Sul, the southernmost state in Brazil. The main intention of the JCA in creating those colonies was to resettle Russian Jews during the mass immigration from the hostile Russian Empire. The first colonies were Philippson (1904) and Quatro Irmãos (1912). However, these colonization attempts all failed because of "inexperience, insufficient funds and poor planning" and also because of "administrative problems, lack of agricultural facilities and the lure of city jobs."

In 1920, the JCA began selling some of the land to non-Jewish settlers. Despite the failure, "The colonies aided Brazil and helped change the stereotypical image of the non-productive Jew, capable of working only in commerce and finance. The main benefit from these agricultural experiments was the removal of restrictions in Brazil on Jewish immigration from Europe during the 20th century."

== Other 20th-century developments ==
By the First World War, about 7,000 Jews were inhabiting Brazil. In 1910 in Porto Alegre, capital of Rio Grande do Sul, a Jewish school was opened and a Yiddish newspaper, Di Menshhayt ("Humanity") was established in 1915. One year later, the Jewish community of Rio de Janeiro formed an aid committee for World War I victims.

Congregação Israelita Paulista ("CIP," or "Israeli Congregation of São Paulo), the largest synagogue in Brazil, was founded in by Dr. Fritz Pinkus, who was born in Egeln, Germany.

Associação Religiosa Israelita (the "Israeli Religious Association"), now a member of the World Union for Progressive Judaism, was founded by Dr. Heinrich Lemle, who emigrated from Frankfurt to Rio de Janeiro in 1941.

The Albert Einstein Israelite Hospital in São Paulo was founded in 1955 and inaugurated in 1971. It has a medical and nursing school. It is considered one of the best medical centers in Latin America.

== Antisemitism ==
=== Auto-da-fé ===
The first recorded auto-da-fé was held in Paris in 1242. Auto-da-fés took place in France, Spain, Portugal, Brazil, Peru, Ukraine, in the Portuguese colony of Goa, India and in Mexico where the last in the world was held in 1850. Nearly five hundred auto-da-fés were "celebrated" by the Roman Catholic Church over the course of three centuries, and thousands of Jews met their deaths this way usually after months of suffering in the Inquisition's prisons and torture chambers. This brutal and public ritual consisted of a Catholic Mass, a procession of heretics and apostates, many of them Marranos, or "secret Jews", and their torture and execution by burning at the stake. Last-minute penitents were garroted to spare the pain of death by burning. Auto-da-fé victims were most frequently apostate former Jews and former Muslims, then Alumbrados (followers of a condemned mystical movement) and Protestants, and occasionally those who had been accused of such crimes against the Roman Catholic Church as bigamy and sorcery.

Historians note that the best-known action of the Inquisition against Crypto-Jews in Brazil were the Visitations of 1591–93 in Bahia; 1593–95 in Pernambuco; 1618 in Bahia; around 1627 in the Southeast; and in 1763 and 1769 in Grão-Pará, in the north of the country. In the 18th century, the Inquisition was also active in Paraíba, Rio de Janeiro, and Minas Gerais. Approximately 400 "judaizers" were prosecuted, most of them being condemned to imprisonment, and 18 New Christians were condemned to death in Lisbon.

One of the best-known Portuguese playwrights, António José da Silva (1705-1739), "the Jew," who lived part of his life in Portugal and part in Brazil was condemned to death by the Inquisition in 1739. His parents, João Mendes da Silva and Lourença Coutinho, were descended from Jews who had emigrated to the colony of Brazil to escape the Inquisition, but in 1702 that tribunal began to persecute the Marranos or anyone of Jewish descent in Rio, and in October 1712 Lourença Coutinho became a victim. Her husband and children accompanied her to Portugal when António was 7 years old, where she figured among the "reconciled" in the auto-da-fé of July 9, 1713, after undergoing the torment only. António produced his first play or opera in 1733, and the next year he married his cousin, D. Leonor Maria de Carvalho, whose parents had been burnt by the Inquisition, while she herself had gone through an auto-da-fé in Spain and been exiled on account of her religion. They had their first daughter in 1734, but the years of their marriage, and of Silva's dramatic career, were few, for on October 5, 1737 husband and wife were both imprisoned on the charge of "judaizing." A slave of theirs had denounced them to the Holy Office. Though the details of the accusation against them seemed trivial and contradictory, and some of his friends testified about his Catholic piety and observation, António was condemned to death. On October 18, like those who wanted to die in the Catholic faith, he was first strangled and after had his body burnt in an auto-da-fé. His wife, who witnessed his death, did not long survive him.

Another notable person is Isaac de Castro Tartas (1623-1647) who emigrated to Brazil from France and Holland. In 1641 he arrived in Paraíba, Brazil, where he lived for several years. Against the wishes of his relatives there, he went later to Bahia de Todos os Santos (present day, Salvador), the colony's capital, where he was recognized as a Jew, arrested by the Portuguese Inquisition, and sent to Lisbon where he died as a Jewish martyr.

=== 20th century antisemitism ===
Heightened antisemitism in Brazil in the 1900s reached its peak during 1933–1945 with the ascent of Nazism in Germany. Brazil blocked its doors to an influx of Jewish refugees from Europe during the Holocaust. Research by Brazil's Virtual Archives on Holocaust and Antisemitism Institute (Arqshoah) has uncovered that between 1937 and 1950 more than 16,000 visas were issued to European Jews attempting to escape the Nazis were denied by the governments of presidents Getúlio Vargas and Eurico Gaspar Dutra.

In 2025, the CONIB recorded 989 antisemitic incidents in Brazil, a 149 % increase compared with 2022. Incidents include both in-person attacks and online antisemitism, with the highest number of incidents recorded in the state of São Paulo.

== Attitude towards antisemitism ==
Brazil strictly condemns antisemitism, and such an act is an explicit violation of the law. According to the Brazilian penal code, it is illegal to write, edit, publish, or sell literature that promotes antisemitism or racism. The law provides penalties of up to five years in prison for crimes of racism or religious intolerance and enables courts to fine or imprison for two to five years anyone who displays, distributes, or broadcasts antisemitic or racist material.

In 1989, the Brazilian Congress passed a law prohibiting the manufacture, trade and distribution of swastikas for the purpose of disseminating Nazism. Anyone who violates this law is liable to serve a prison term from between two and five years. (Law no. 7716 of 5 January 1989)

In 2022, a Pentecostal pastor, Tupirani da Hora Lores, who prayed in front of his congregation for a second Holocaust was sentenced to 18 years and 6 months in prison. The pastor was released the same year.

According to a U.S. Department of State report, antisemitism in Brazil remains rare. The results of a global survey on antisemitic sentiments, released by the Anti-Defamation League, ranked Brazil among the least antisemitic countries in the world. According to this global survey conducted between July 2013 and February 2014, Brazil has the lowest "Anti-Semitic Index" (16%) in Latin America and the third lowest in all Americas, only behind Canada (14%) and the United States (9%).

In 2026, a lawyer was sentenced to two years in prison, later commuted to community service, for calling for removing all Jews from positions of leadership in the Brazilian Lawyers Institute (IAB) and for calling for the closure of the Jewish federation of Rio de Janeiro. The court found that the remarks went beyond free speech and constituted "incitement to discrimination and harm against Jews."

== Present-day Jewish community ==
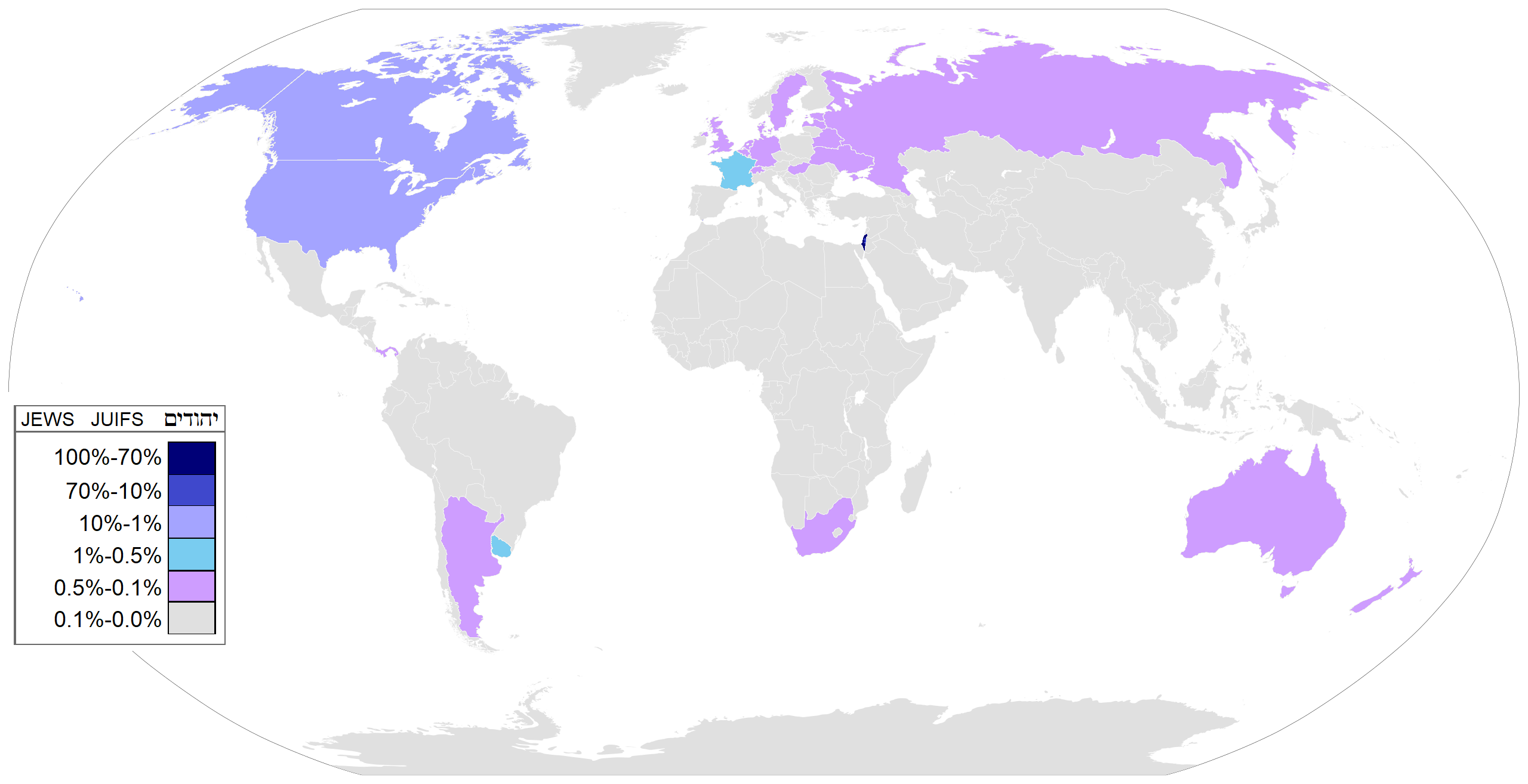
Jewish population by country (2010)

Brazil has the 10th largest Jewish community in the world, about 107,329 according to the 2010 Brazilian Census. The Jewish Confederation of Brazil (CONIB) estimates that there are more than 120,000 Jews in Brazil, with the lower figure representing active practitioners. About half of Brazilian Jews live in the state of São Paulo, about a quarter in the state of Rio de Janeiro, and there are also sizeable communities in the states of Rio Grande do Sul, Paraná, Minas Gerais, Pernambuco, Bahia, Pará and Amazonas.

The Brazilian Jewish community is composed of Ashkenazi Jews of Central and Eastern European origin and Sephardic Jews of Iberian, North African and Middle Eastern origin. It is unclear which group is more numerous. Both groups exist in the largest cities of São Paulo and Rio de Janeiro, where they have mixed to some extent. In the North Region most Jews are Sephardic, and in the South Region most Jews are Ashkenazi.

Brazilian Jews play an active role in politics, sports, academia, trade and industry, and are overall well integrated in all spheres of Brazilian life. Jews lead an open religious life in Brazil and there are rarely any reported cases of antisemitism in the country. In the main urban centers there are schools, associations and synagogues where Brazilian Jews can practice and pass on Jewish culture and traditions. Some Jewish scholars say that the only threat facing Judaism in Brazil is the relatively high frequency of intermarriage, which in 2002 was estimated at 60%. Intermarriage is especially high among the country's Jews and Arabs. As of 2006, no more than 20% of Brazilian Jews kept kosher. Brazilian Jews exist across a wide religious spectrum, including Orthodox, Conservative, Reform, and secular Jews. Most Brazilian Jews are non-Orthodox and the majority of Brazilian synagogues are affiliated with the Conservative and Reform movements. Historically, until the 1930s, Orthodox Judaism was the main form of Judaism due to immigration of Eastern European Jews, but Central European Jewish immigrants later introduced Reform Judaism. The majority of the Brazilian Jewish community identifies as secular and Zionist. Chabad has a growing influence in Brazil. The majority of Brazilian Jews are Ashkenazi, often of Polish or German descent, while there is a significant Sephardic and Mizrahi minority of mostly Lebanese, Syrian, Moroccan, and Egyptian descent.

There has been a steady stream of aliyah (immigration to Israel) since the nation's foundation in 1948. Between 1948 and 2021, more than 16,000 Brazilians immigrated to Israel.

=== Size of Jewish communities in Brazil ===
All states, the Federal District, and municipalities with more than 100 Jews are listed below. The numbers are from the 2010 census.

State	Jews
São Paulo	51,050
Rio de Janeiro	24,451
Rio Grande do Sul	7,805
Paraná	4,122
Minas Gerais	3,509
Pernambuco	2,408
Bahia	2,302
Pará	1,971
Amazonas	1,696
Federal District (Note: For statistical purposes, the Federal District is treated as a state and as a municipality named Brasília.)	1,103
Santa Catarina	1,036
Espírito Santo	900
Goiás	813
Paraíba	626
Ceará	580
Mato Grosso do Sul	416
Mato Grosso	374
Maranhão	368
Rio Grande do Norte	320
Alagoas	309
Piauí	229
Amapá	217
Sergipe	184
Rondônia	166
Tocantins	163
Roraima	154
Acre	59

Municipality	State	Jews
São Paulo	SP	43,610
Rio de Janeiro	RJ	21,800
Porto Alegre	RS	6,658
Curitiba	PR	3,184
Belo Horizonte	MG	1,384
Belém	PA	1,346
Recife	PE	1,286
Manaus	AM	1,183
Brasília	DF	1,103
Salvador	BA	1,010
Campinas	SP	644
Niterói	RJ	600
Santos	SP	471
Jaboatão dos Guararapes	PE	423
Santo André	SP	357
Florianópolis	SC	350
Cotia	SP	330
Teresópolis	RJ	313
Santana de Parnaíba	SP	306
Vitória	ES	268
Natal	RN	266
João Pessoa	PB	264
Contagem	MG	255
São Gonçalo	RJ	254
Maceió	AL	251
Fortaleza	CE	247
Goiânia	GO	234
Macapá	AP	217
Governador Valadares	MG	209
Joinville	SC	209
Guarulhos	SP	204
Benjamin Constant	AM	203
Caruaru	PE	191
Serra	ES	187
Itu	SP	185
Teresina	PI	175
Ilhéus	BA	174
Erechim	RS	163
Cabo Frio	RJ	161
Vinhedo	SP	158
Piracicaba	SP	154
Francisco Sá	MG	149
Porto Seguro	BA	148
Aparecida de Goiânia	GO	142
Sorocaba	SP	142
Petrolina	PE	140
Barueri	SP	139
Duque de Caxias	RJ	138
Campo Grande	MS	136
Belford Roxo	RJ	136
Petrópolis	RJ	136
Itabuna	BA	132
Betim	MG	130
Taubaté	SP	128
Eunápolis	BA	123
Vila Velha	ES	123
Carapicuíba	SP	121
Campina Grande	PB	120
Corumbá	MS	118
Franco da Rocha	SP	118
São Bernardo do Campo	SP	118
Ananindeua	PA	116
Almirante Tamandaré	PR	115
Caxias do Sul	RS	112
São José do Rio Preto	SP	112
Atibaia	SP	108
Jundiaí	SP	108
Maricá	RJ	106
Aracaju	SE	105
Franca	SP	105
Mogi das Cruzes	SP	103

== See also ==
- Amazonian Jews
- Dutch Empire
- Dutch Brazil
- Jewish Agency for Israel
- Kahal Zur Israel Synagogue
- List of Brazilian Jews
- List of Latin American Jews
- Morashá
- Oldest synagogues in the world#Recife, Brazil
- History of the Jews in Latin America
- Brazil–Israel relations
- History of Pernambuco#Jews in Pernambuco
