= Brazil–Israel relations =

- Brazil: Israel

Diplomatic mission
- Embassy of Brazil, Tel Aviv: Embassy of Israel, Brasília

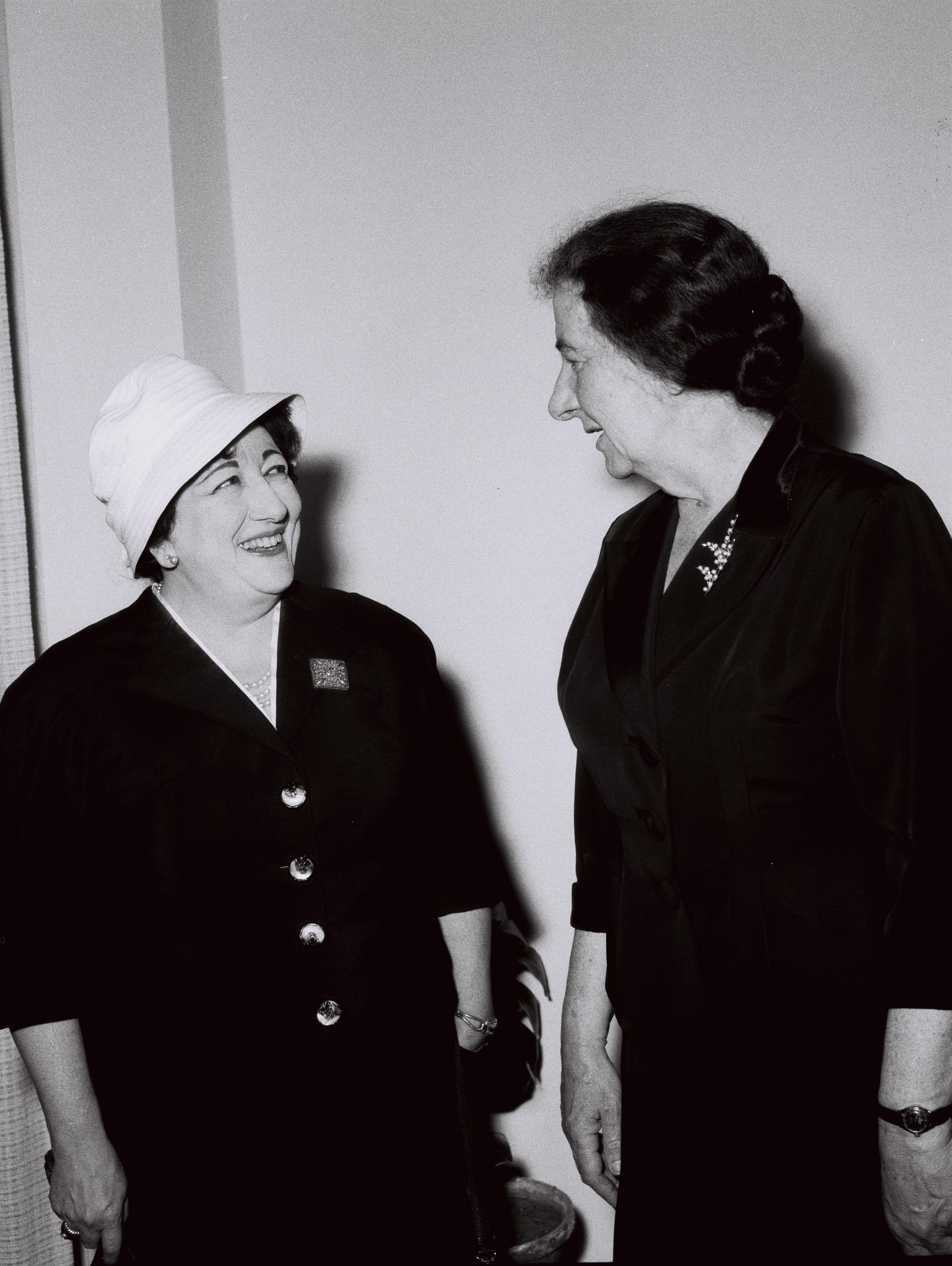
Ambassador of Brazil to Israel Odette de Carvalho e Souza meeting foreign minister Golda Meir in 1959.

Brazil has an embassy in Tel Aviv and an honorary consulate in Haifa. Israel has an embassy in Brasília and a consulate-general in São Paulo. The Brazilian ambassador to Israel is Gerson Menandro Garcia de Freitas. Israel's current ambassador to Brazil is Daniel Zohar Zonshine. Brazil and Israel maintain close political and military ties. The two nations enjoy a degree of arms cooperation. Brazil is a full member state of the International Holocaust Remembrance Alliance, while several Brazilian elected officials participate in the Israel Allies Caucus, a political advocacy organization that mobilizes pro-Israel parliamentarians in governments worldwide.

Brazil has the 9th largest Jewish community in the world and the 2nd largest in Latin America, with 107,329 Jews in Brazil in 2010, according to the IBGE census. The Jewish Confederation of Brazil (CONIB) estimates that there are more than 120,000 Jews in Brazil. Around 25,000 Brazilians live in Israel, most of them being Brazilian Jews.

On February 17, 2024, the Brazilian President Luiz Inácio Lula da Silva denounced the military operations of Israel while speaking to reporters at the African Union summit in Addis Ababa, comparing the events in Gaza to that of the Holocaust. The statement was highly contentious within Israel, receiving strongly-worded statements from Prime Minister Benjamin Netanyahu and other public figures. On February 19, 2024, Brazil then recalled their ambassador to Israel, and summoned the Israeli ambassador for a reprimand, following Israel deeming the president of Brazil a persona non grata.

== Role in the establishment of the State of Israel ==
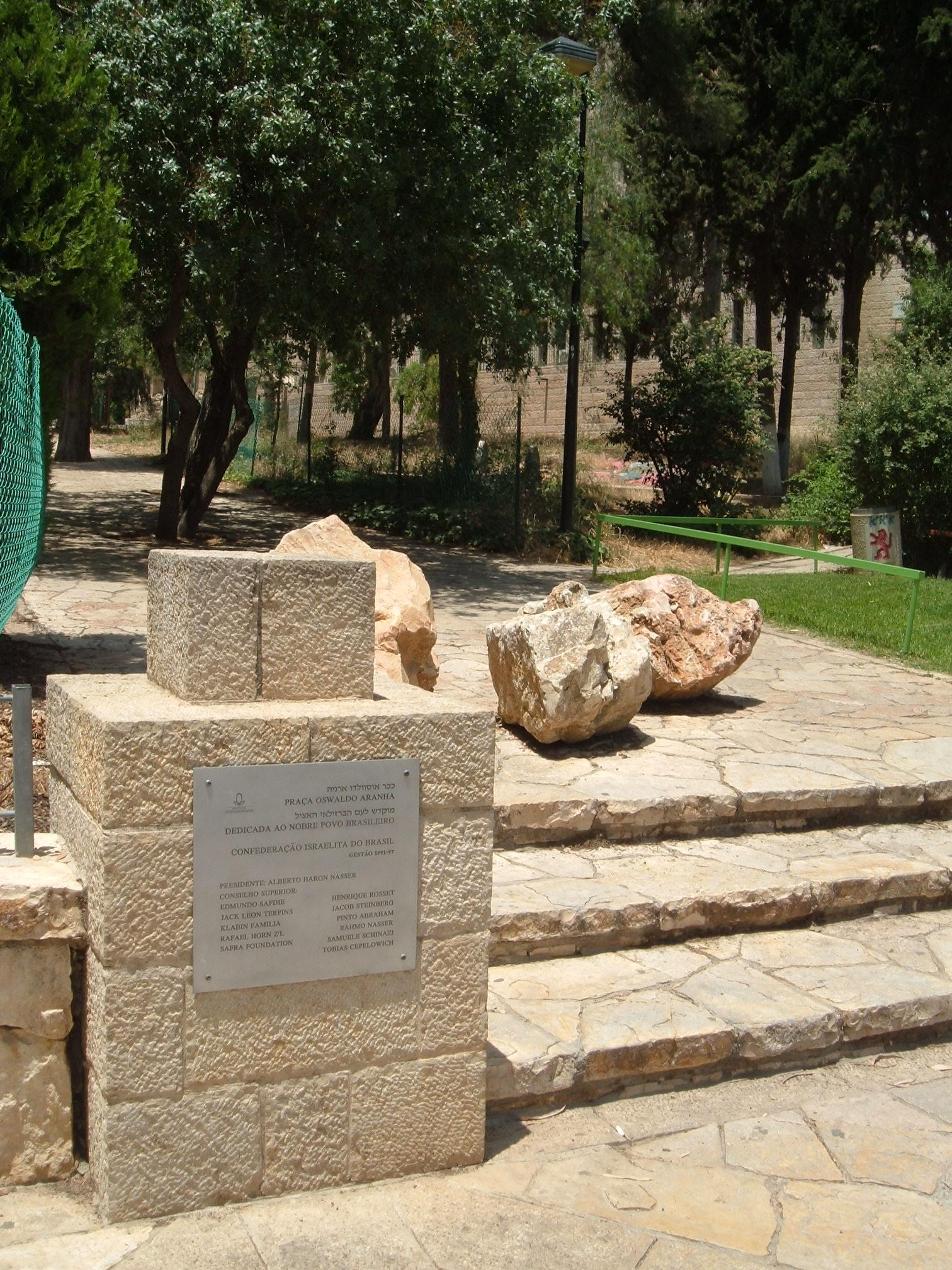
Memorial Plaque in honor of Brazilian Ambassador to the UN, Osvaldo Aranha, at Aranha Square in Jerusalem.

Brazil played a large role in the establishment of the State of Israel. Brazil held the Presidency office of the United Nations General Assembly in 1947, which proclaimed the Partition Plan for Palestine. Brazilian Ambassador Oswaldo Aranha, then the chairman of the United Nations General Assembly, supported and heavily lobbied for the partition of Palestine toward the creation of the State of Israel.

Feldberg is careful to point out, however, that this vote in favor of Israel was largely political, as Brazil was trying to strengthen relations with the United States, who was in favor of the Partition. Despite this vote, they abstained in a vote that decreed Israel was a sovereign nation. Brazil also did not move its embassy to Jerusalem, largely because the Vatican was against it.

Today, streets in Israeli cities such as Beer-Sheva and Ramat-Gan, and a square in Jerusalem, are named after Oswaldo Aranha. In 2007, a street in Tel Aviv was named in his honor at a ceremony attended by his relatives and Brazil's ambassador to Israel.

Brazil was also one of the first countries to recognize the State of Israel, on 7 February 1949, less than one year after Israeli Declaration of Independence. The first Israeli embassy was opened in 1955 in Rio de Janeiro, then capital of Brazil, with David Shaltiel as the first ambassador.

== Political ties ==
Some Brazilian politicians participate in the Israel Allies Caucus, a transnational pro-Israel lobby coalition. Federal Deputy Fátima Pelaes, a representative for the state of Amapá in the Brazilian Parliament, serves as the co-chair for the Brazil Israel Allies Caucus.

Brazil stands alongside Israel in the fight against antisemitism. Brazil strictly condemns antisemitism, and antisemitic acts are an explicit violation of the law. According to the Brazilian penal code it is illegal to write, edit, publish, or sell literature that promotes antisemitism or racism. The law provides penalties of up to five years in prison for crimes of racism or religious intolerance and enables courts to fine or imprison for two to five years anyone who displays, distributes, or broadcasts antisemitic or racist material, although antisemitism in Brazil remains rare. Also in 1989, the Brazilian Senate passed a law (law no. 7716 of 5 January 1989) prohibiting the manufacture, trade and distribution of swastikas for the purpose of disseminating Nazism. Anyone who breaks that law is liable to serve a prison term of between two and five years.

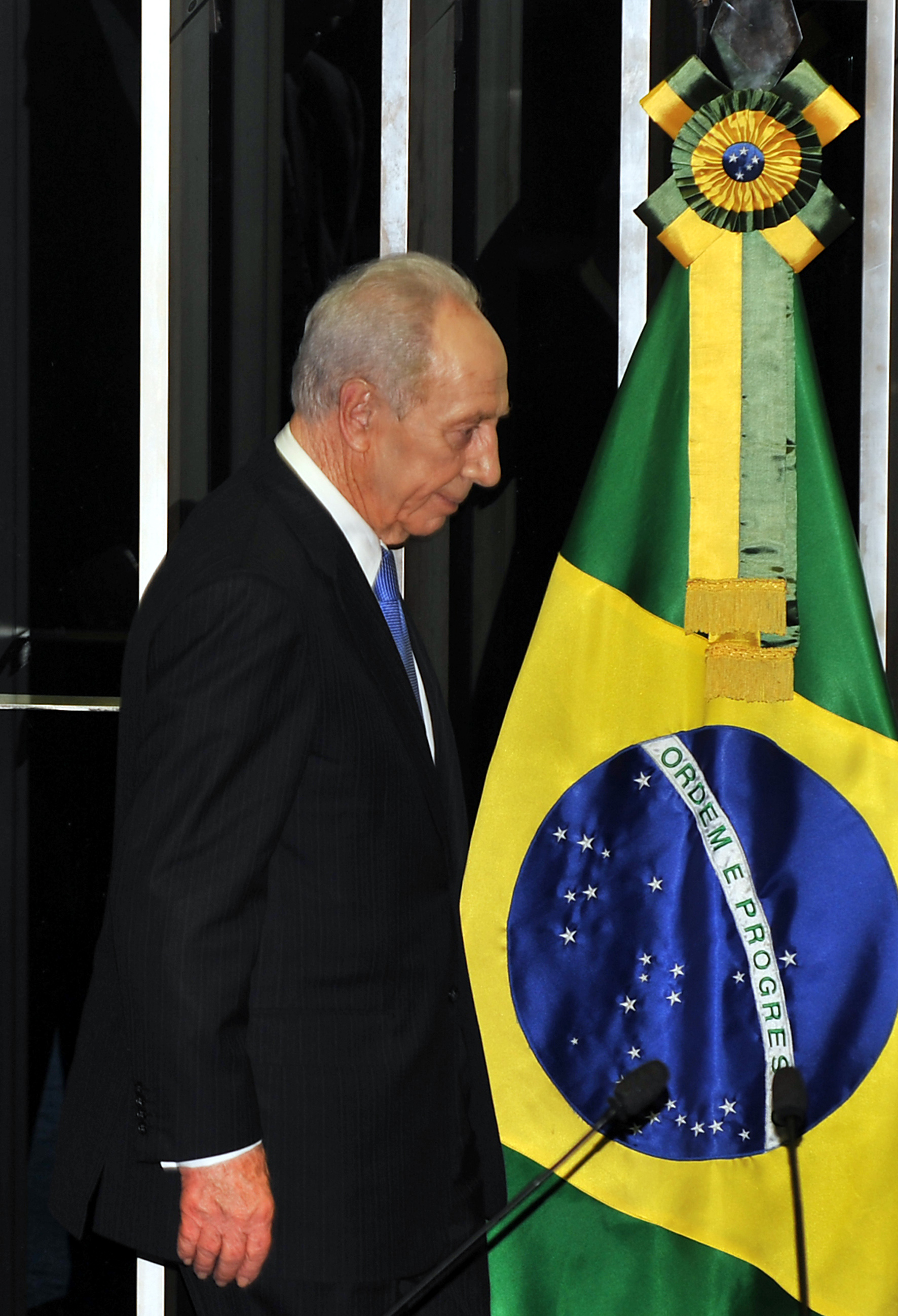
Israeli President Shimon Peres at the Brazilian Chamber of Deputies in 2009.

The growing political relations between the two countries over the years are based on a history of friendship and cooperation. In recent years, several Israeli ministers have been to Brazil, in particular the ministers of agriculture, public security, education, diaspora and public diplomacy, and trade. On the Brazilian side, Israel was visited by the Minister of Education (2006), the President of the Central Bank, the Minister of Environment, the Minister of National Integration (2007), the Secretary for Women Policies, the Secretary for Strategic Affairs (2008), the Minister of Defense, the Minister of Tourism and the Head of the Institutional Security Cabinet (2010). The Minister of Trade, Industry and Development accompanied the former president in March 2010. Brazilian Minister of Foreign Affairs Celso Amorim visited Israel five times between 2005 and 2010.

In July 2014 Brazil condemned "the disproportionate use of force by Israel in the Gaza Strip" and recalled its ambassador to Tel Aviv. Israel called Brazil a "diplomatic dwarf that creates problems rather than contributes to solutions," and compared the proportionality of the death toll to Brazil's defeat at the 2014 World Cup. In August 2014, President of Israel Reuven Rivlin apologized to the President of Brazil Dilma Rousseff for these statements, which he said did not represent the feelings of the Israeli population.

Brazil–Israel relations have improved significantly during the presidency of Jair Bolsonaro since 2019. Brazilian president Bolsonaro has expressed his love for Israel several times. He has even said to have turned Brazil into Israel's new best friend.

In December 2019, Brazil opened a trade office in Jerusalem. Brazil also considered moving its embassy to Israel from Tel Aviv to Jerusalem.

== Past state visits ==
Israeli President Zalman Shazar scheduled a seven-day state visit to Brazil in 1966. From July 18 to July 25, Israel's president was the official guest of President Castello Branco. In honor of the Israeli President, a bill calling upon the Brazilian government to grant honorary citizenship to President Shazar was introduced on May 23, 1966, in the Chamber of Deputies at Brasilia. The bill in the federal legislature was introduced by Deputy Cunha Bueno. The Brazilian Post Office Department announced on June 1, 1966, that it would issue a special postage stamp carrying a portrait of Mr. Shazar.

Although Juscelino Kubitschek, president of Brazil between 1956 and 1961, visited Israel after his tenure, Luiz Inácio Lula da Silva was the first Brazilian president to visit Israel while in office, in 2010.

During the 2009 Shimon Peres state visit to Brazil, the Israeli Foreign Ministry announced the reopening of the Israeli consulate-general in São Paulo, Brazil.

== Recent state visits ==
Netanyahu's official visit to Brazil

Prime Minister Benjamin Netanyahu's visit to Brazil between December 2018 and January 2019 marked the first official visit by an Israeli prime minister. The prime minister landed in Brazil on December 28, 2018, in Rio de Janeiro, for a five-day visit. He and Israeli first lady Sara Netanyahu were received by the Israeli ambassador to Brazil, Yossi Shelley, by federal deputy Eduardo Bolsonaro, son of president-elect Jair Bolsonaro, and by the city's mayor, Marcelo Crivella.

Netanyahu's first appointment was at the Copacabana Fort, where he met with Bolsonaro in addition to the future Minister of Economy, Paulo Guedes, Minister of Foreign Affairs, Ernesto Araújo, and Minister of Defense, Fernando Azevedo e Silva. Netanyahu invited Bolsonaro to visit Israel. They agreed to strengthen agricultural cooperation in sectors such as the economy, security, water management, agriculture and technology.

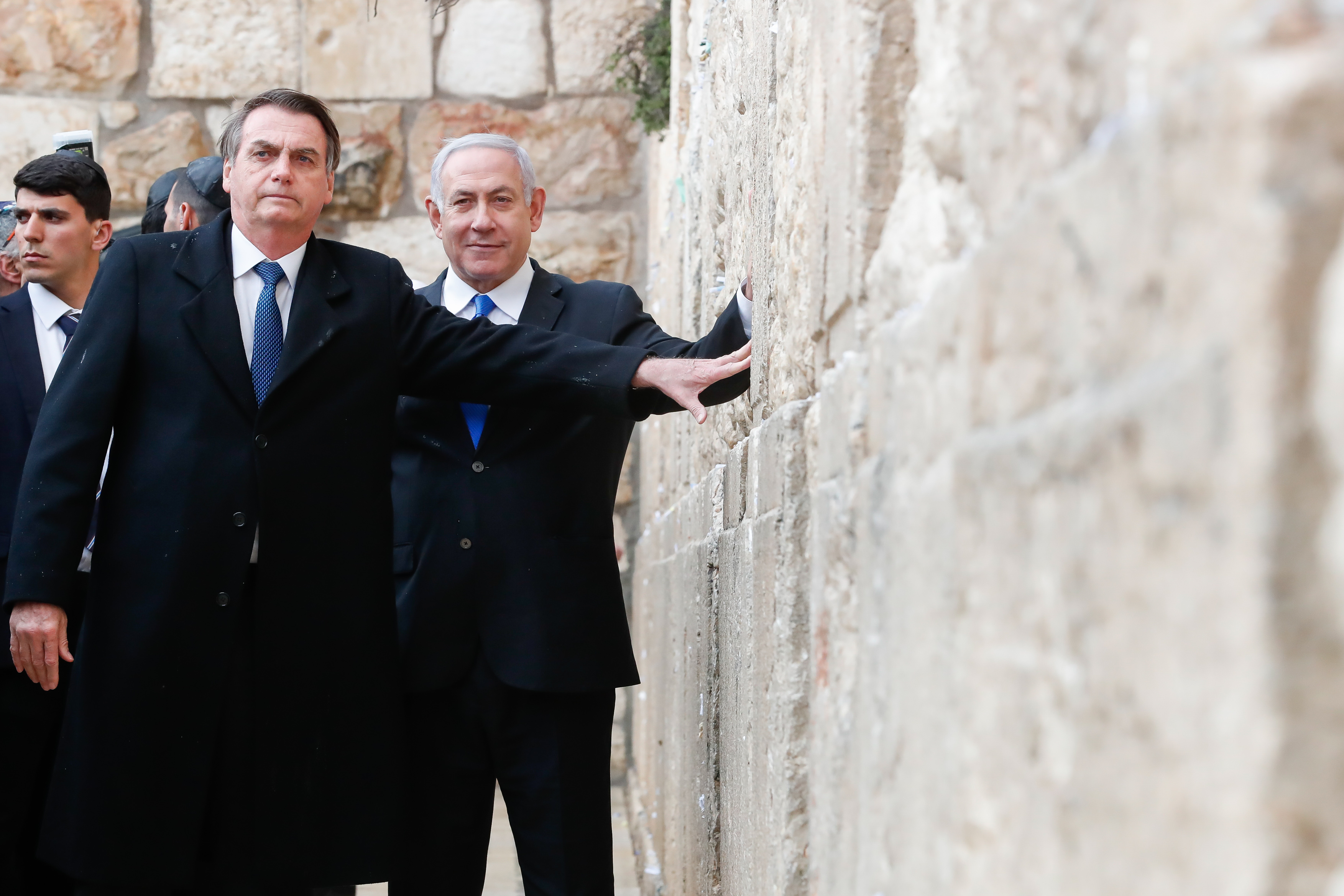
Brazilian President Jair Bolsonaro with Israeli Prime Minister Benjamin Netanyahu at the Western Wall, 1 April 2019

After the meeting, Bolsonaro offered Netanyahu the highest and most important national prize in Brazil, awarded to prominent and influential people. It was previously awarded to former US president Dwight D. Eisenhower and Queen Elizabeth II. On December 30, he and his wife participated in an event with leaders of the Brazilian Jewish community and a meeting with Brazilian Christian friends from Israel. During the event, the Post Office of the Brazilian state of Amazonas launched a stamp prepared by Israeli Christian friends in Manaus in honor of Israel's 70 years of independence. In Brasilia, on January 1, 2019, Netanyahu participated in the inauguration ceremony of Jair Bolsonaro as president of Brazil, in a historic landmark of relations between the two countries.

President Jair Bolsonaro visits the State of Israel

At the invitation of Israeli Prime Minister Benjamin Netanyahu, President Jair Bolsonaro's first official visit was to Israel. The trip took place on March 31, 2019, and it was the first time that a representative from Brazil honored the country with an official trip early in his term. In a speech next to Netanyahu, Bolsonaro emphasized the importance of the former head of the United Nations, Osvaldo Aranha, for the creation of the State of Israel in 1948.

The visit resulted in agreements in the fields of science and technology, defense, public security, civil aviation, cybersecurity, and health. Brazil recalled that Jerusalem has been an inseparable part of the identity of the Jewish people for more than three millennia and has become the political heart of the modern and thriving State of Israel.

In this spirit, and 72 years after participating in the first chapter of the recreation of the State of Israel, Brazil has decided to establish an office in Jerusalem for the promotion of trade, investment, technology and innovation, to be coordinated by the Ministry of Foreign Affairs and the Brazilian Export and Investment Promotion Agency (Apex-Brasil). Bolsonaro also visited one of the local symbols of Judaism, the Western Wall, in a historical event.

== Agreements ==
Energy

The two governments agreed to cooperate in several sectors, such as oil and gas, thermoelectricity and renewable energies. In the field of energy and mining, they recognized the transformative role of innovation, robotics and cybersecurity. As two relevant natural gas producers, the two countries will exchange best practices on the design of domestic natural gas markets.

Science, Technology and Innovation

During President Jair Bolsonaro's visit to Israel, a Cooperation Agreement in Science and Technology was signed, which will allow the launch of new initiatives in the field of science and technology.

Trade promotion / investments

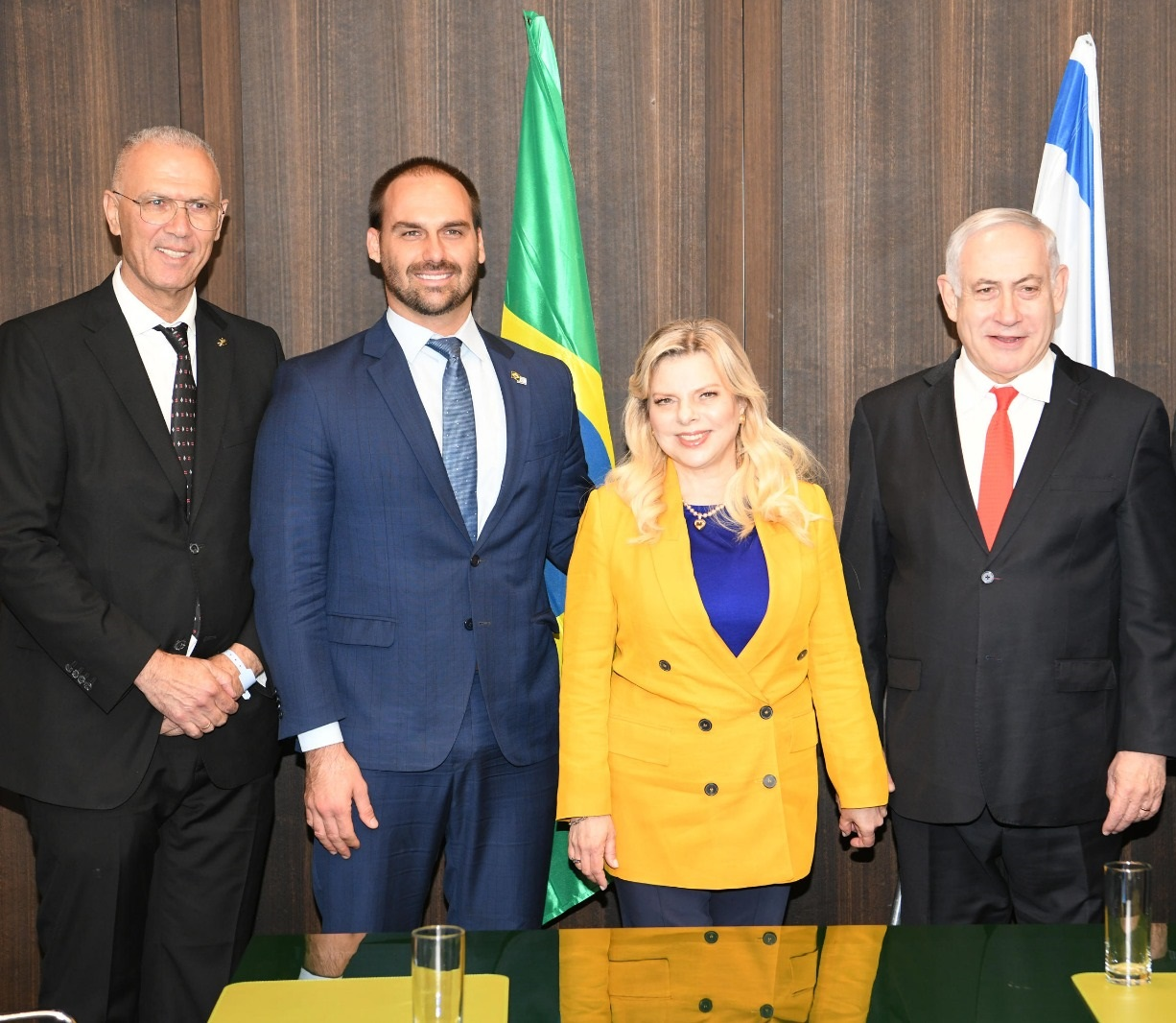
Ambassador Yossi Shelley, congressman Eduardo Bolsonaro, Israeli first lady Sara Netanyahu and prime minister Benjamin Netanyahu at the opening of Brazil's economic office in Jerusalem, in December 2019

In December 2007, a Free Trade Zone Agreement between Israel and Mercosur was signed, Brazil being the largest partner of Israel in Latin America. Israel was the first extra-regional partner to set an agreement of this type with the economic bloc. The agreement aims to open the market of goods trade, rules of origin, safekeeping, cooperation in technical and sanitary norms, technological and technical cooperation and customs cooperation.

The president of the Federation of Industries of the State of São Paulo, Paulo Skaf said during a 2010 conference in Jerusalem that Brazil will triple trade with Israel by 2015. The conference was attended by Brazilian President Lula da Silva, Israeli President Shimon Peres and a group of Brazilian and Israeli business leaders.

In the context of tourism, 60,000 Brazilians visited Israel in 2012. The number is 20% higher than it was in 2011. Due to that growth, the Israeli Ministry of Tourism aims to bring 140,000 Brazilians to Israel in 2014. The basic strategies are the expansion of the Representative Office of the Ministry of Tourism in Brazil and the facilitation route between Brazil and Israel, with the Israeli airline El Al beginning its operations in the Brazil.

The leaders noted that exchanges between Brazil and Israel in the fields of science, technology and innovation illustrate the synergies that exist in several areas, which can and should be further explored to stimulate reciprocal investments, which are below the level and complexity of the economies of the two countries.

Brazil opened a commercial office in Jerusalem to strengthen the partnership with the country in the areas of innovation, technology and investments. The office is managed by the Brazilian Export and Investment Promotion Agency (Apex-Brasil) and operates in the Jerusalem Gati Business Center building. On 15 December 2019, the trade office was officially opened in Jerusalem. The Arab League condemned Brazil's opening of the trade office in the city of Jerusalem.

Culture

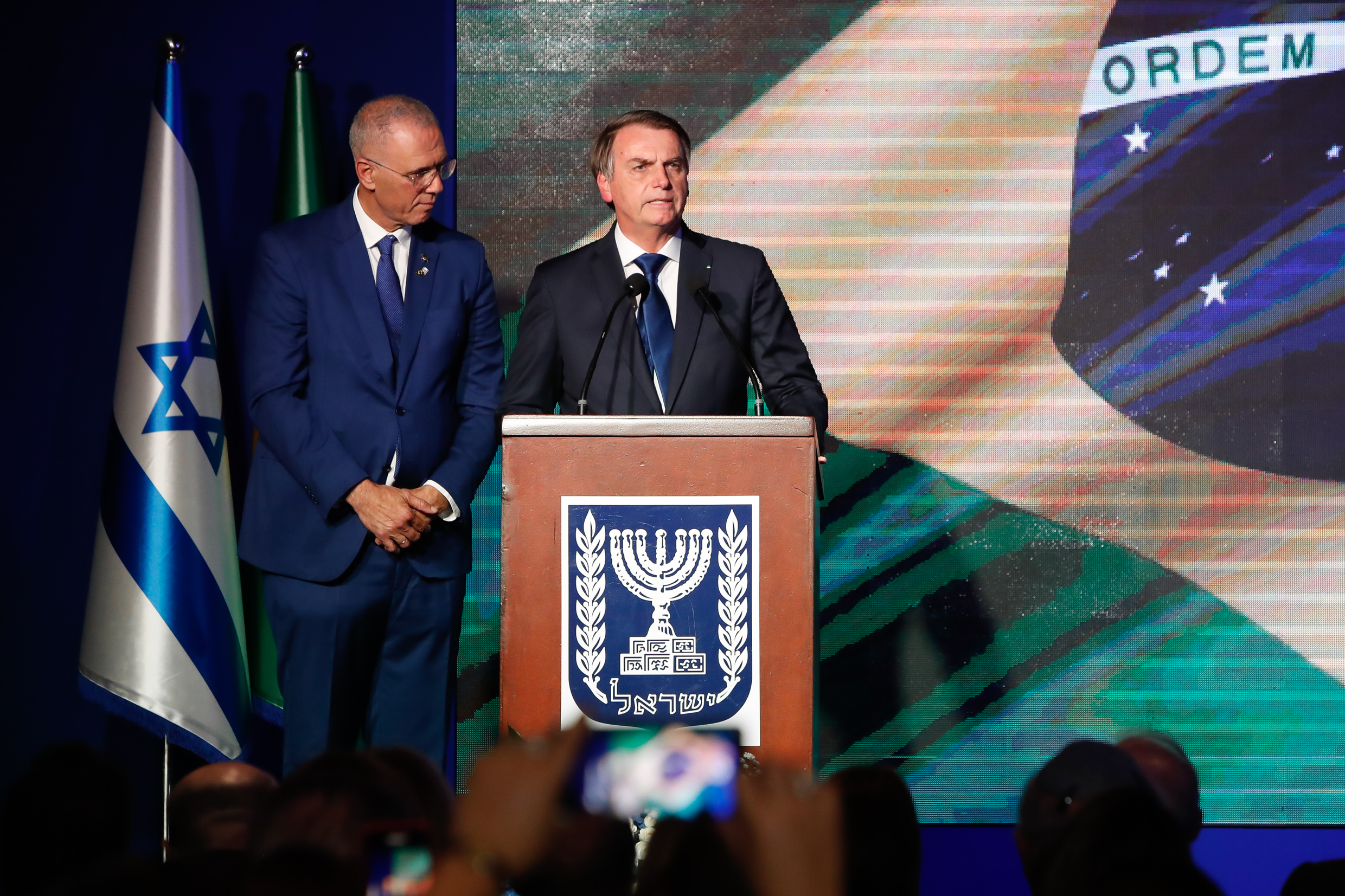
Brazilian President Jair Bolsonaro and Israeli Ambassador in Brazil, Yossi Shelley, on the 71st anniversary of Israel, Brasília.

Rio de Janeiro is a sister city with Haifa, Tel Aviv (since 2006), and Ramat Gan (since 2010). São Paulo and Tel Aviv are sister cities since 2004. There is an important Jewish community in São Paulo. According to Raphael Singer, a former Israeli diplomat in Brasília, around 60,000 Jews lived in São Paulo at the time.

On October 25, 2013, the Israeli foreign ministry stated that Israel will team up with Brazil's Jewish community to deliver medical aid to Africa. The aid project is scheduled to begin in January 2014 in Guinea Bissau and is headed by Claudio Lottenberg, the head of the Confederação Israelita do Brasil (CONIB), an umbrella group of Brazilian Jewry.

In September 2018, the Brazilian delegation to the Jerusalem March totaled 900 people, accounting for the largest group at the annual Sukkot event in Jerusalem.

In the cultural area, Brazil and Israel have been developing cooperation ties. In 2009, the Cinematographic Co-Production Agreement was signed in Brasilia between the governments of the two countries. It was approved by the National Congress in November 2016 and promulgated by President Michel Temer in May 2017, in order to favor the development of film and television production, as well as encourage the development of cultural and technological ties between the two countries.

Civil Aviation

Countries have entered into an air services agreement to increase connectivity between and increase the operational freedom of airlines, which will help to strengthen ties between their societies.

Defense

The two nations enjoy a degree of arms cooperation, with Brazil recently announcing that it was going to produce the Israeli-made TAR-21 Assault Rifle under license.

Brazil is a key buyer of Israeli weapons and military technology. In addition to the hundreds of millions of dollars in contracts signed with Israeli manufacturer Elbit since 2000, the Brazilian Air Force signed a $90 million, five-year lease for 12 Kfir aircraft, and Rafael-manufactured Derby missiles were purchased in 2006. Most recently, Israel Aircraft Industries signed a $350 million contract in November 2009 to supply drones to the Brazilian police - the largest such deal ever between Israel and Brazil.

In 2011, the Federative Republic of Brazil awarded a medal to the Head of the Israeli International Military Cooperation Department of the Planning Directorate, Col. Hanny Caspi, for her peace-making efforts. The medal was given to Col. Caspi during a ceremony at the Brazilian Embassy in Tel Aviv, to honor her contribution in promoting the security cooperation between the Israel Defense Forces and the Brazilian Army. The Brazilian Ambassador to Israel, Maria Alicia Bregner also mentioned that she is excited that the head of the department is a woman. Col. Caspi is only the fourth Israeli officer to receive the medal, which is signed by the General of the Brazilian Ground Forces, and is considered as a gesture of respect and appreciation. The countries signed a Defense Cooperation Agreement, which provides a legal framework for joint military initiatives and opens the way for closer ties in this field.

== Missions of humanitarian aid ==
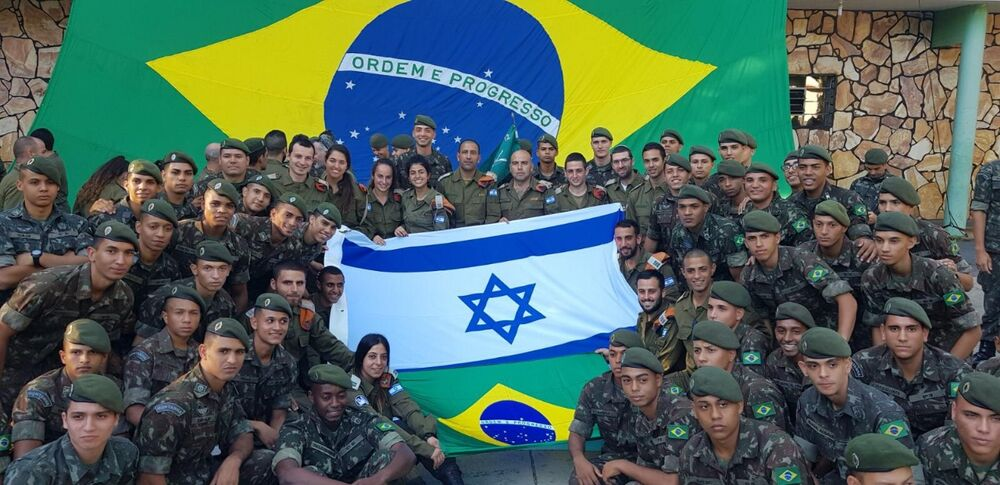
Military of Brazil and Israel during the rescue operation in Brumadinho, in January 2019

Israel's Brumadinho aid delegation

In January 2019, Israel assisted Brazil in one of the biggest disasters in Brazilian history, the rupture of the Brumadinho dam. The country was the only one to offer assistance at the time. The tragedy killed 270 people and caused great environmental and property losses. Soon after the structure collapsed, Prime Minister Benjamin Netanyahu ordered a troop of about 130 people to be sent to Brazil to help locate victims. The Israeli government sent rescue teams and equipment to locate victims amid the mud in an operation led by the Israel Defense Forces (IDF) and articulated by the Israeli embassy in Brazil. Israel's ambassador, Yossi Shelley, personally accompanied the searches. In four days of operation, the Israeli mission located 35 missing people, with no survivors. In recognition of Israeli aid, Governor Romeu Zema paid tribute to members of the mission for their joint efforts with Brazilian teams.

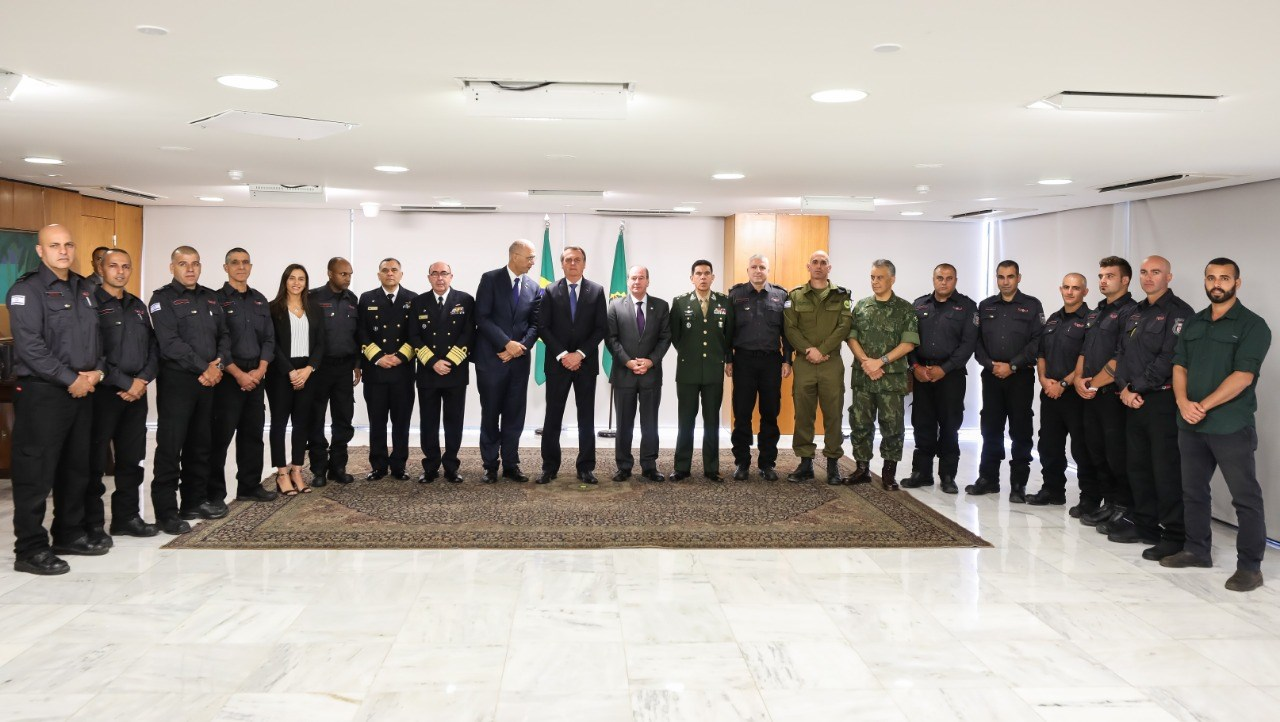
President Jair Bolsonaro receives Israeli firefighters at the Planalto Palace in September 2019

Israeli firefighters in the Amazon

Forest fires in the Amazon in September 2019 mobilized leaders around the world. The State of Israel sent a team of eleven fire-fighting specialists to Brazil to assist in the work against fires in the North. The delegation received in Brasília by the President of the Republic, Jair Bolsonaro, helped the Brazilian teams that were on the front lines of the combat in the Rondônia region. Under the command of Israeli military attaché Oded Knaan, the 11 professionals landed in Porto Velho on September 5 and participated with 39 Brazilian military personnel in the actions to combat fire. To help with the work in the Amazon, the group brought high-tech equipment and exchanged experiences with Brazilian firefighters.

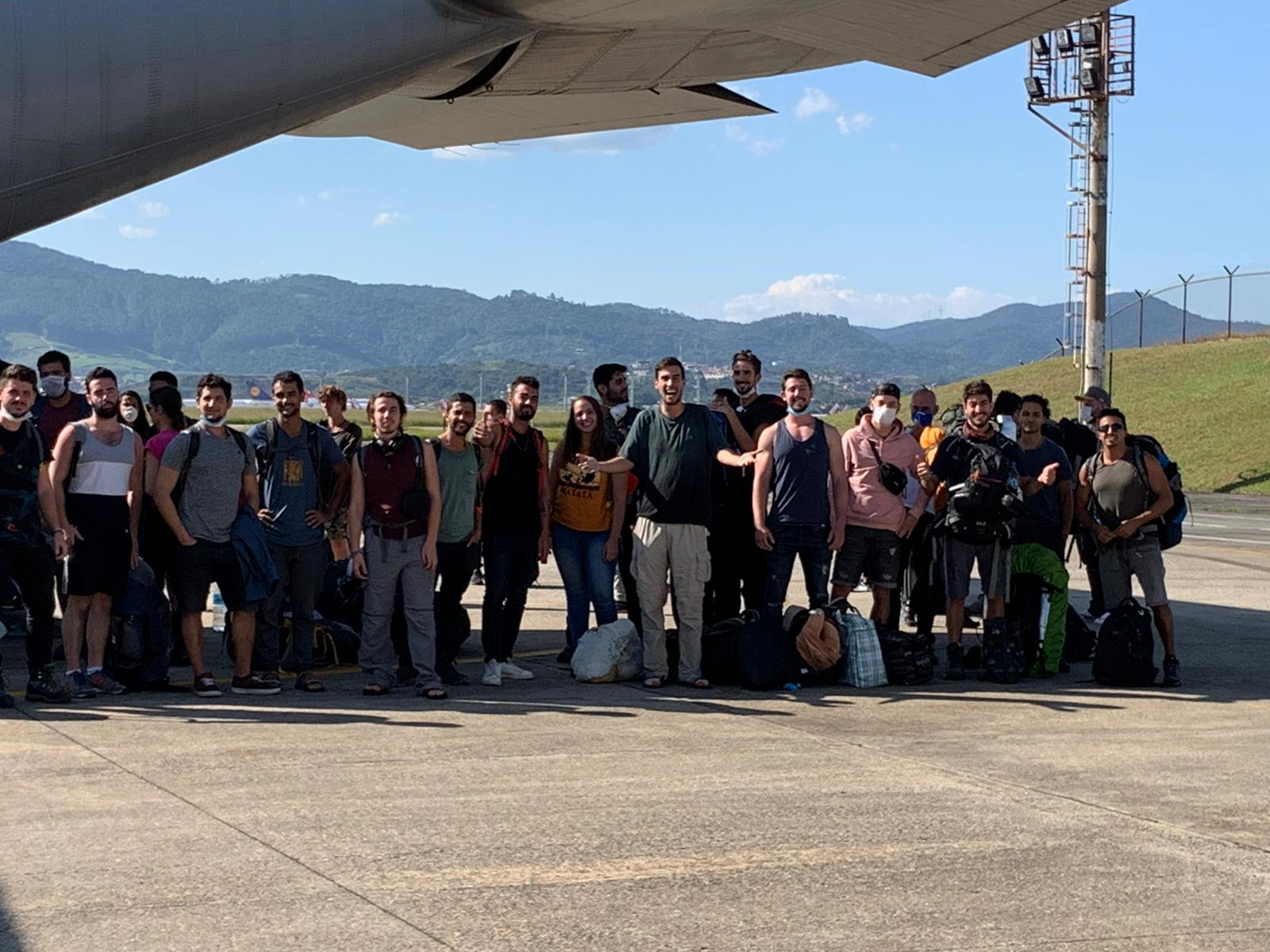
Group of travelers which has been rescued in Bolivia in March 2020 with the coordination of the embassy of Israel in Brazil

Rescue operation in Bolivia

On March 28, 2020, the Israeli Ministry of Foreign Affairs, with the coordination of the Israeli embassy in Brazil and the support of Brazil's Foreign Ministry, conducted a complex operation to rescue Israeli, Brazilian and other nationals who were held in Bolivia after the closing of the country's borders due to the COVID-19 pandemic. It was the first group of foreigners authorized to leave Bolivia after the beginning of the crisis caused by COVID-19. The Bolivian government also contributed to the mission's success.

In total, 56 travelers were rescued and went to their countries of origin, including: 24 Brazilians, 23 Israelis, three Australians, two Canadians, two Singaporeans and two Hungarians. The travelers were picked up by a private plane, provided by the Israeli Embassy in Brazil, from five different points in Bolivia, to the city of Santa Cruz de la Sierra. Then they took off on a Bolivian army plane to Guarulhos International Airport, in São Paulo.

== Disputed issues ==
On March 2, 2023, Israel's Foreign Ministry spokesperson, Lior Haiat, strongly criticized the Luiz Inácio Lula da Silva's Brazilian government for permitting two Iranian warships to dock in Rio de Janeiro. Haiat deemed this decision as a "dangerous and regretful development," and urged Brazil to promptly send the warships away.

== Response to the Gaza war ==
On October 18, Brazil dispatched a plane to Egypt carrying water purifiers to donate to Gaza, intending to evacuate Brazilians dual nationals from Gaza upon its return. The aircraft was scheduled to wait until Israel approved the departure of the Brazilian nationals.

On November 1, the first list of about 500 foreigners allowed to leave Gaza was released. As days passed, individuals of various nationalities but not Brazilians were permitted to leave Gaza. This led to suspicions among some Brazilians that Israel were doing a retaliation due to Brazil's role in the UN.

The Israeli ambassador to Brazil, Daniel Zohar Zonshine, reassured there were no political reasons for the delayed authorization.

On November 8, ambassador Zonshine remarked that Egypt was setting a daily quota for evacuations and attributed the delays to Hamas.

Journalist Reinaldo Azevedo criticized this explanation, alleging that the list of evacuees was determined by Israel and that Brazilian nationals were being held as diplomatic hostages.

On the same day, Brazilian Federal Police executed two temporary arrest warrants and eleven search warrants against a group suspected of preparing for terrorism. The operation sought evidence of possible recruitment of Brazilians for terrorist acts in Brazil linked to Hezbollah. Ambassador Zonshine commented, "If they chose Brazil, it's because there are people helping them." This statement elicited a strong and critical reaction from Brazilian authorities.

On November 9, former president Jair Bolsonaro tweeted that the Workers' Party (PT), the party of the current president Lula, sympathies with Hamas. That afternoon, Zonshine met with Brazilian deputies, showing videos from the October 7 attacks and sitting next to Bolsonaro. This meeting generated significant negative repercussions. Some deputies, like Lindbergh Farias of PT, even called for Zonshine's expulsion.

On November 10, Brazilians were authorized to leave Gaza, but the border remained closed. On November 12, all of the 32 Brazilians who requested to be evacuated were able to leave Gaza through Egypt. They were transported on the presidential aircraft VC-2. Upon their arrival in Brasília on the night of November 13, they were welcomed by president Lula. During this reception, the president condemned Israel's response as inhumane.

In July 2025, Brazil’s Foreign Ministry spoke out against Israeli military operations in Gaza and the West Bank, expressing concern that “impunity” was undermining international law. Then, in September of that same year, Brazil officially joined the genocide case that South Africa had brought against Israel at the International Court of Justice—a case that alleges Israel’s actions in Gaza amount to genocide. Spain, Ireland, Mexico, and Turkey had already signed on to the case before Brazil. Earlier that year, there were controversies between the two countries over investigations and arrests of Israeli soldiers vacationing in Brazil.

=== Lula deemed persona non grata ===
In February 2024, while giving a speech at the African Union summit in Addis Ababa, Brazilian President Lula da Silva condemned the military actions of Israel in Palestine, describing the situation in the Gaza Strip as being without historical parallel, then, after a pause, amending that it did exist when Hitler orchestrated the genocide of the Jews during the Holocaust. Israeli Prime Minister Benjamin Netanyahu rebuked the statements made by Lula, calling them "shameful" and "alarming". He also called the statements Holocaust trivialization, as well as an effort to undermine the Jewish people and Israel's right to self-defense.

Israel retaliated by deeming the Brazilian President persona non grata, issuing a demand that he rescind his statements for the status to be revoked. Brazil responded by recalling their ambassador to Israel and summoning the Israeli ambassador for a reprimand. In an interview for the Brazilian news platform G1, Celso Amorim, one of Lula's advisors and former foreign affairs minister of Brazil, called Israel's response "absurd", and continued that it only served to further isolate Israel diplomatically.

== Downgrade ==
In August 2025, Israel announced it would be downgrading relations with Brazil after the South American country refused to approve Israel's new appointed ambassador to the country.

== Resident diplomatic missions ==
Of Brazil

- Tel Aviv (Embassy)

Of Israel

- Brasília (Embassy)
- São Paulo (Consulate-General)

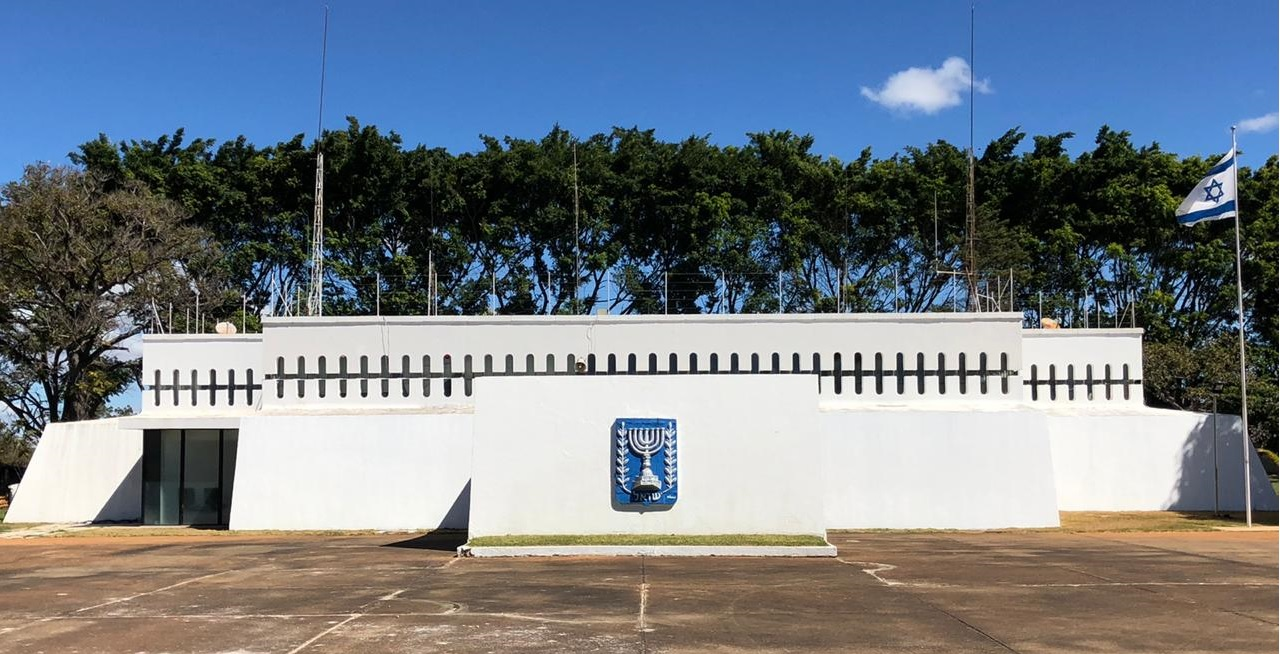
Embassy of Israel in Brasília

== See also ==
- History of the Jews in Brazil
- Foreign relations of Brazil
- Foreign relations of Israel
- International recognition of Israel
