= Morasha (disambiguation) =

Morasha was a short-lived political party in Israel during the 1980s.

Morasha, Morashah (Hebrew: מורשה, Heritage) can also refer to:

- Morashá, a Brazilian Jewish magazine
- Beit Midrash Morasha, a synagogue in Cape Town
- Musrara, Jerusalem, a neighborhood also known as Morasha
- Lauder – Morasha School, Warsaw, Poland
- A major interchange of Highway 4 and Highway 5 in central Israel

== See also ==
- Morazha, Kerala, India
