= Jerusalem March =

Jerusalem March (Hebrew: צעדת ירושלים) is an annual march in Jerusalem that takes place during the week-long festival of Sukkot.

== History ==
The event was inaugurated in 1955. In 2012, 30,000 marchers took part in the event, which draws participants from all over the country as well as many international delegations. 6,000 Christian supporters of Israel also marched through the streets of Jerusalem, singing Hatikva and wishing the Israeli spectators a happy holiday.

The march has a number of routes, the main one running from Kikar Safra in downtown Jerusalem to Gan Sacher, one of the city's largest public parks.

The International Christian Embassy Jerusalem, a pro-Israel Evangelical Christian group, holds its annual conference on Sukkot and conference participants, many in national costumes, take part in the march.

The two largest delegations at the Jerusalem March in 2018 were Brazil, with 900 members, and Ivory Coast, with 500.

== Gallery ==
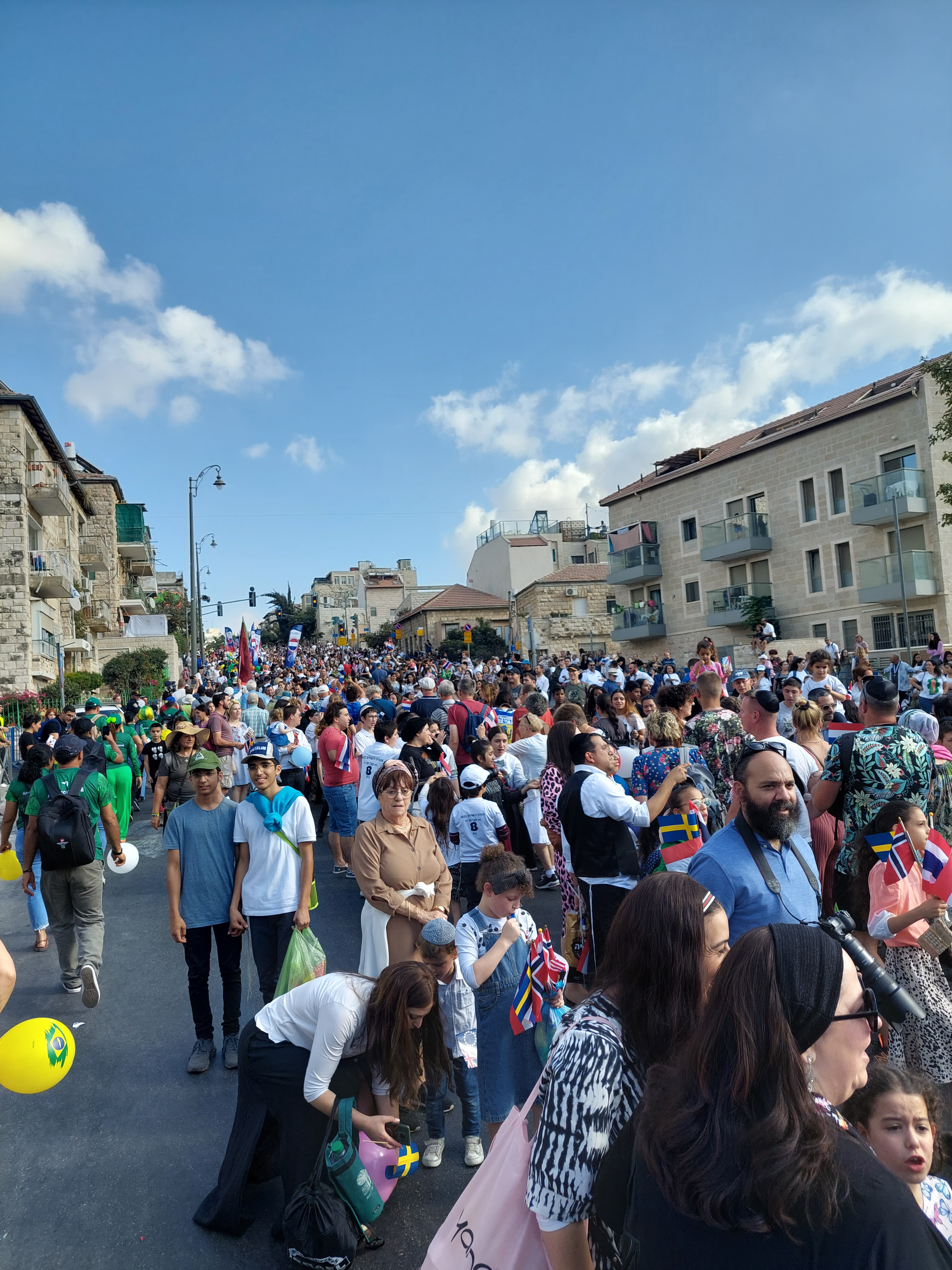
Jerusalem March 2022

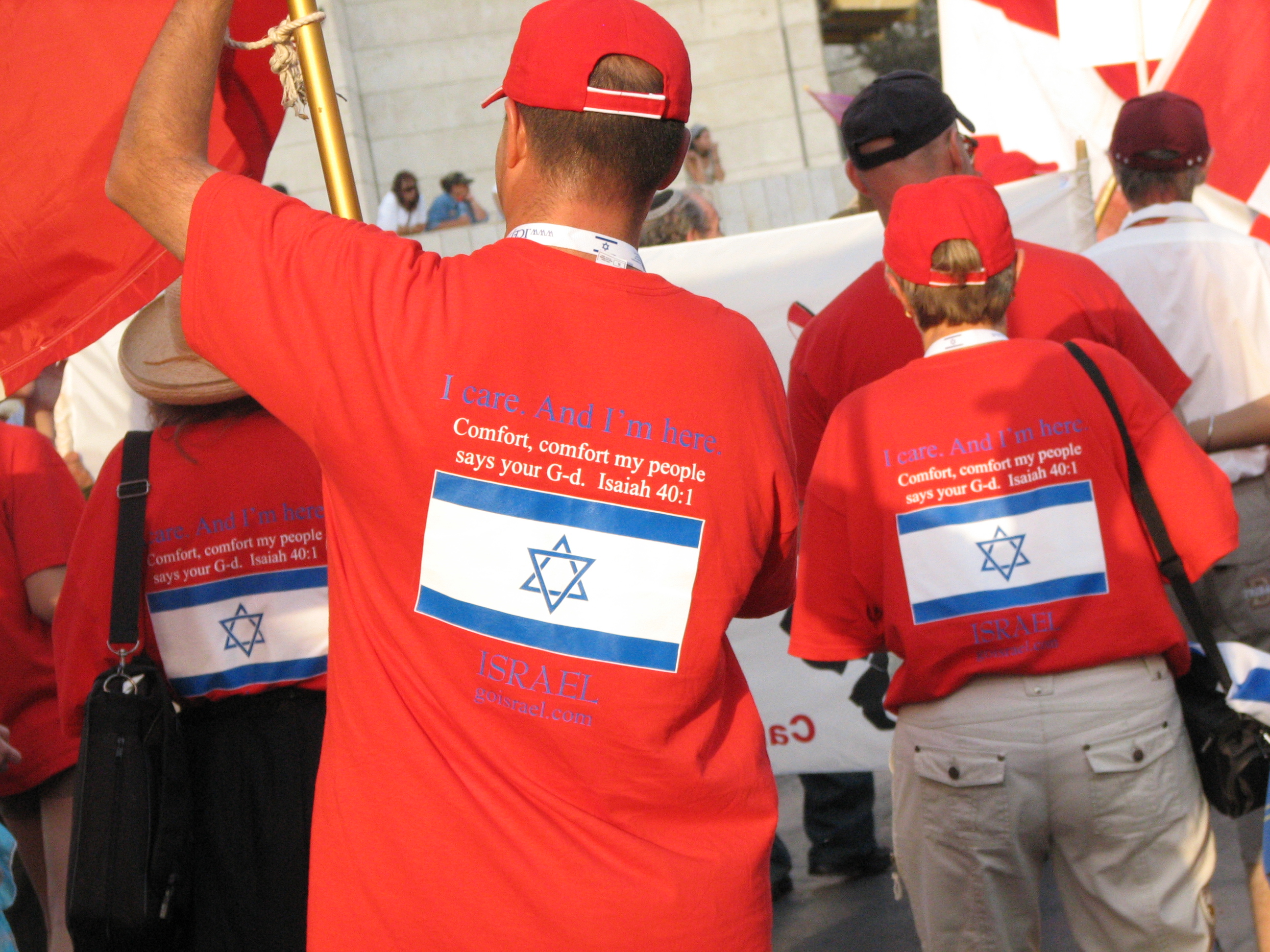
Jerusalem March, 2007

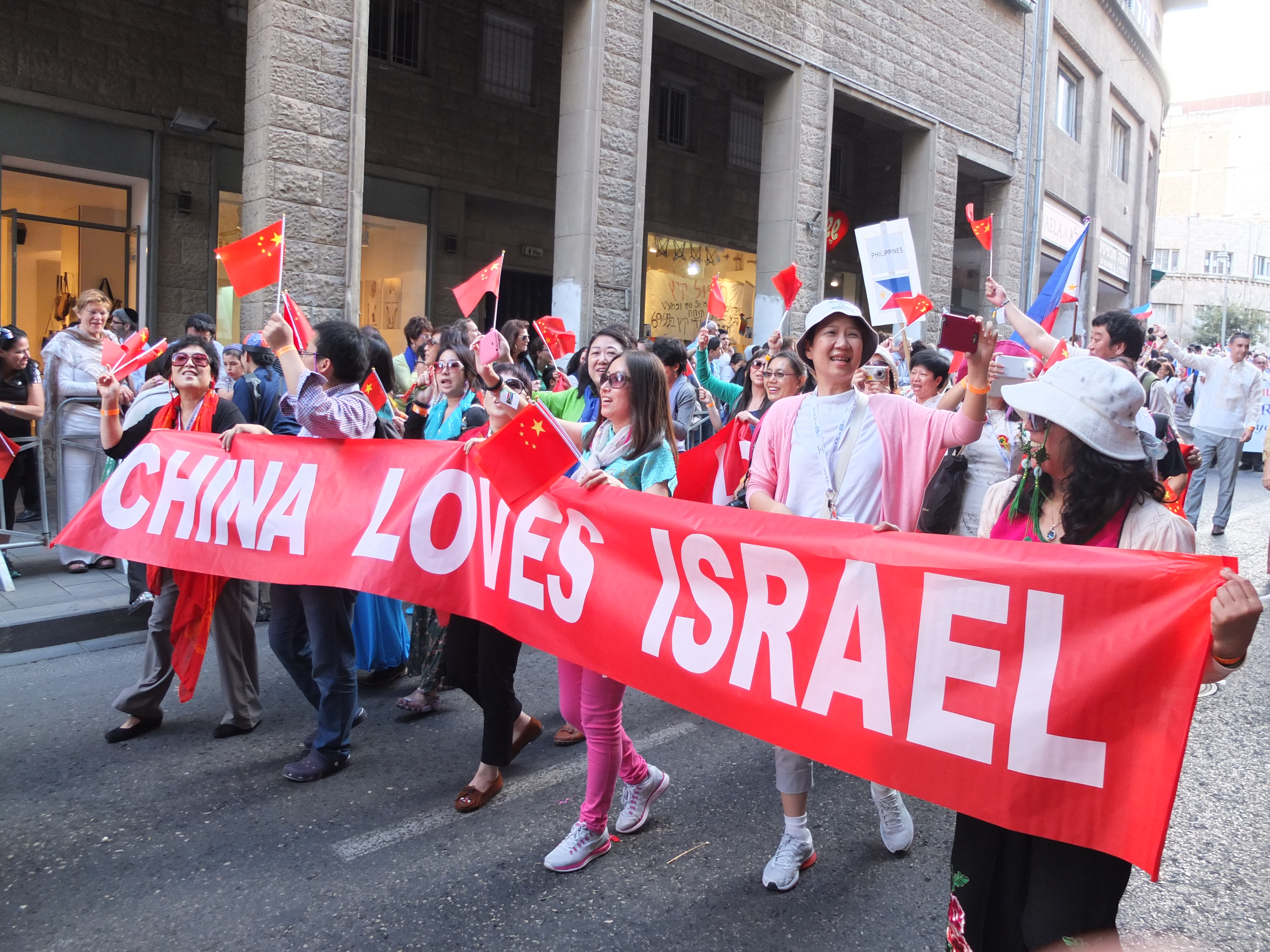
Chinese delegation marching in downtown Jerusalem

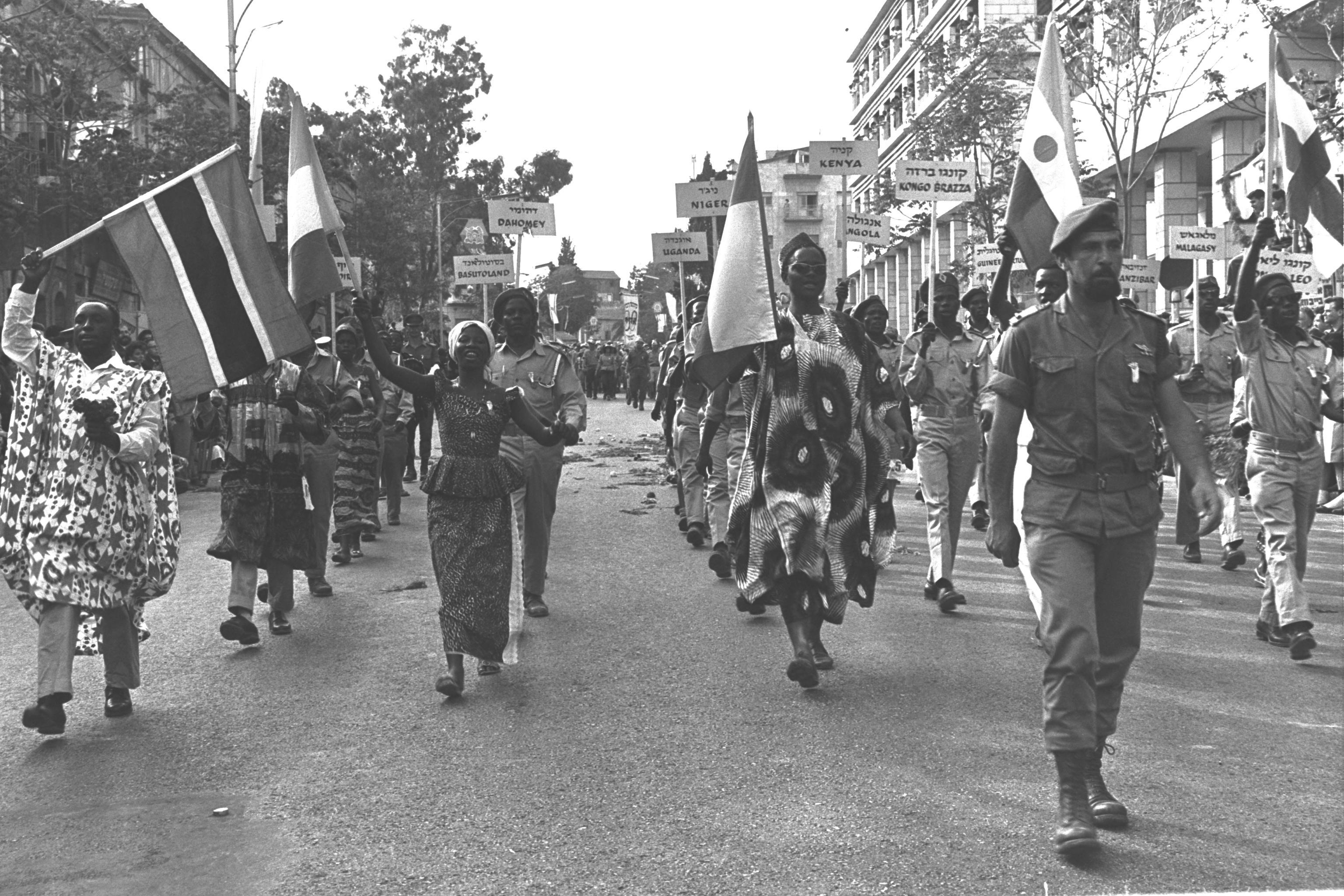
African delegation marching in Jerusalem, 1962

== See also ==
- Culture of Israel
- Tourism in Israel
- Foreign relations of Israel
