= Embassy of Israel, Brasília =

Israeli diplomatic mission in Argentina

שגרירות ישראל בבואנוס איירס Embassy of Israel in Brasília
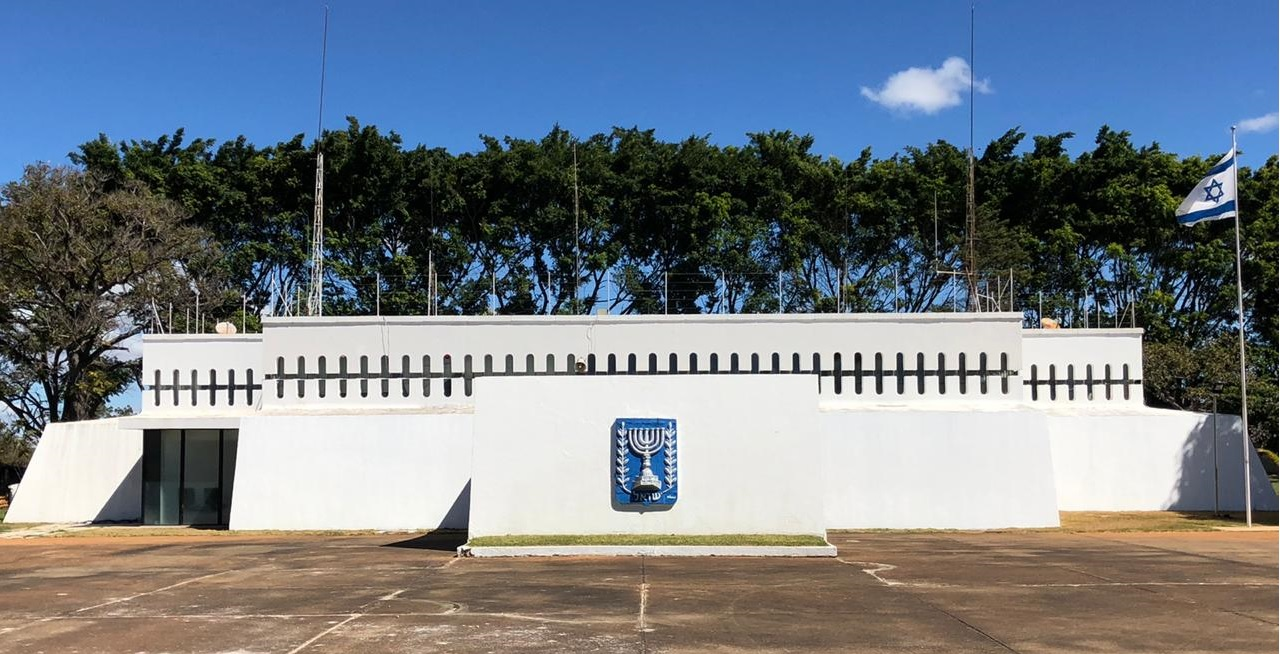
- Location: Brasília, Brazil
- Address: St. de Embaixadas Sul 809 Lote 38 - Asa Sul, Brasília - DF, 70424-900, Brazil
- Ambassador: Daniel Zonshine

The Embassy of Israel in Brasília is the diplomatic mission of Israel in Brazil.

Israel also operates a consulate-general in São Paulo.

== History ==
Diplomatic relations between Brazil and Israel dates back to February 7, 1949, when Brazil was amongst the first countries to recognize the state of Israel. The first embassy was opened, then in Rio de Janeiro, in 1955.
