= Morashá =

- Frequency: 4 times a year
- Circulation: 23,000
- Founded: January 1993
- Country: Brazil
- Language: Portuguese
- Website: morasha.com.br

Morashá (from Hebrew: מורשה, meaning Heritage) is a Brazilian Jewish magazine published by the Morashá Institute of Culture in São Paulo. It is published in the Portuguese language four times a year since 1993 and distributed free of charge among the Brazilian Jewish community.

== History ==
The decision to launch a free magazine for Brazilian Jews was made at a community reunion held at the Beit Yaacov synagogue in São Paulo in January 1993. The first issue came out in May 1993, it was 35 pages long and had a circulation of 5 thousand copies. By 2018, the average circulation of an issue reached 23 thousand. Today, the magazine enjoys support from the Ministry of Culture under the Culture Incentive Law.
