= Henrique Lemle =

German-Brazilian rabbi

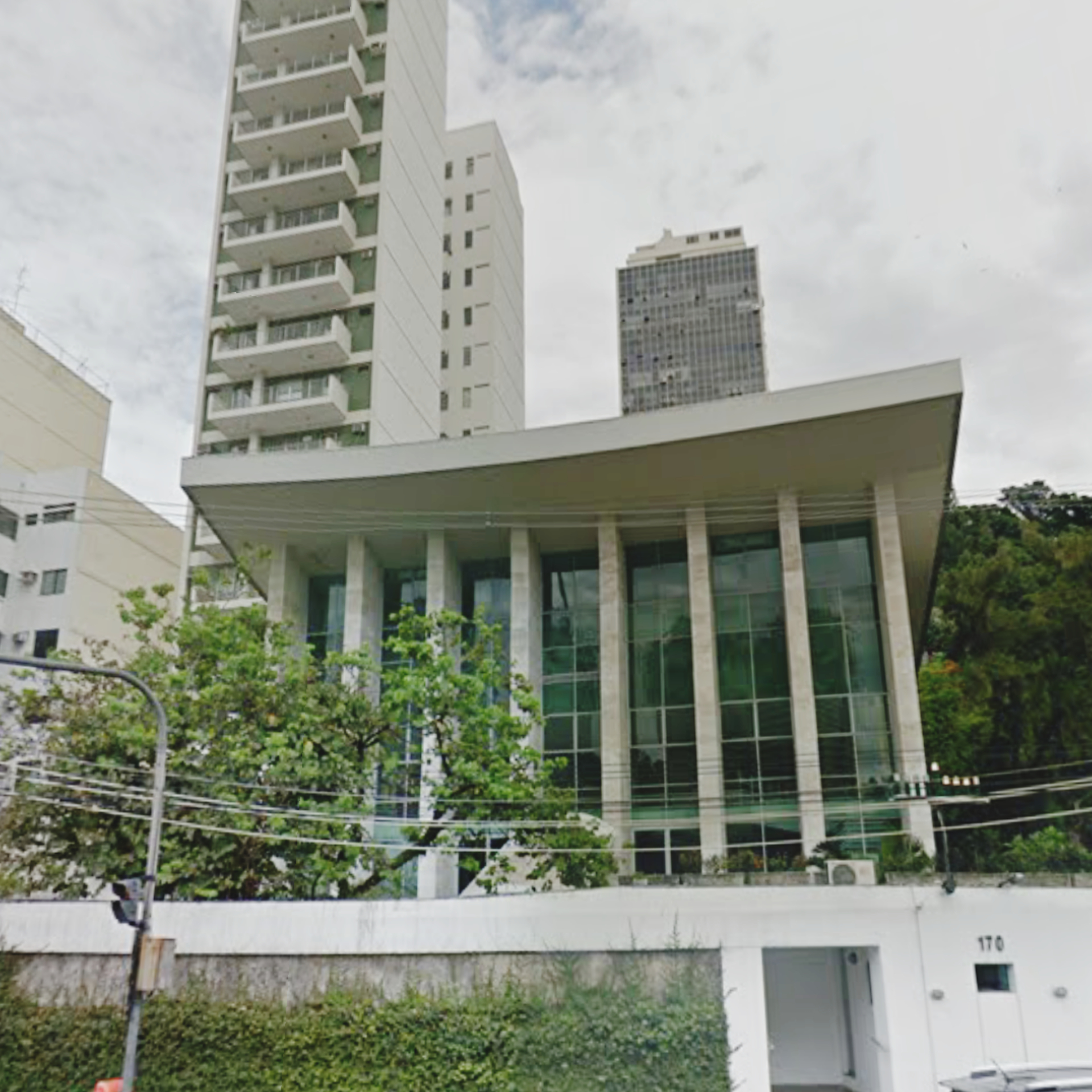
German-Brazilian Jewish Congregation founded by Henrique Lemle

Henrique Lemle (also spelled Heinrich Lemle) was a German-Brazilian rabbi associated with Reform Judaism.

Lemle was born in 1909 in Augsburg, Germany. He received his doctorate degree in 1932 and served as a rabbi in Mannheim and Frankfurt-am-Main. Under the Nazi regime, Lemle was briefly interned in the Buchenwald concentration camp until he was released through the efforts of the Joint Distribution Committee who assisted Lemle in migrating to the United Kingdom. He subsequently migrated to Brazil where his rabbinic career included his position as rabbi to the liberal Jewish community in Rio de Janeiro. He died in Brazil in 1978 at age 68.

== Career ==
After settling in Brazil, Lemle founded the Associacao Religiosa Israelita for Jewish immigrants. Lemle also co-founded the Christian-Jewish Fraternal Council in Brazil.

Lemle authored a number of Jewish books, including a Jewish prayerbook in Portuguese.
