= Brazilian Israelite Confederation =

The Brazilian Israelite Confederation (Confederação Israelita do Brasil or CONIB) is the central organization of the Brazilian Jewish community. The organization was established in 1948. It gathers 14 state federations with some 200 institutions, serving as the community's political representative. The political activities undertaken by CONIB are one of the few national coordination efforts by the organized Jewish community in Brazil.

== Activities ==
CONIB represents the Jewish population of Brazil, which they estimate to be approximately 120,000. CONIB identifies as pro-Israel and Zionist. The organization sees its role to mediate between the Brazilian Jewish community (14 states have Jewish federations) and the executive, legislative and judiciary branches of power in Brazil. They also monitor antisemitism in Brazil.

In 2012, CONIB launched a national essay contest about Anne Frank.

In 2025, CONIB release a report about local antisemitism, which it regarded as “the most comprehensive ever produced in the country.” It includes 989 antisemitic incidents across Brazil, a 149 % increase compared with 2022. The highest number of incidents recorded was in the state of São Paulo. The report includes information about both in-person antisemitic incidents and attacks, and online antisemitic activity.

== Leadership ==
Fernando Lottenberg served as the president of the Brazilian Israelite Confederation from 2014 to 2017. Claudio Lottenberg was elected president of CONIB in July 2022 and he is still serving in this role (as of 2026).
