= Tupirani da Hora Lores =

Brazilian pastor

Personal life
- Citizenship: Brazilian

Religious life
- Religion: Christian
- Denomination: Pentecostalism
- Church: Jesus Christ Generation Church

Senior posting
- Based in: Rio de Janeiro, Brazil

Tupirani da Hora Lores is a Brazilian pastor. He is the founder and leader of the Generation Jesus Christ Church, based in the state of Rio de Janeiro. Lores became the first person to have been found guilty of a religious intolerance crime in Brazil in 2009. Lores was arrested by Federal Police in February 2022, and later convicted of religious intolerance and racism against Jews with a sentence of 18 years and six months of imprisonment after preaching for a second Holocaust. In the same year in November, he was released. In 2025, he was noted to distribute Holocaust revisionist pamphlets.
