= Afro-Haitians =

Haitians with sub-Saharan African ancestry

Afro-Haïtiens (French) Afwo-Ayisyen (Haitian Creole)
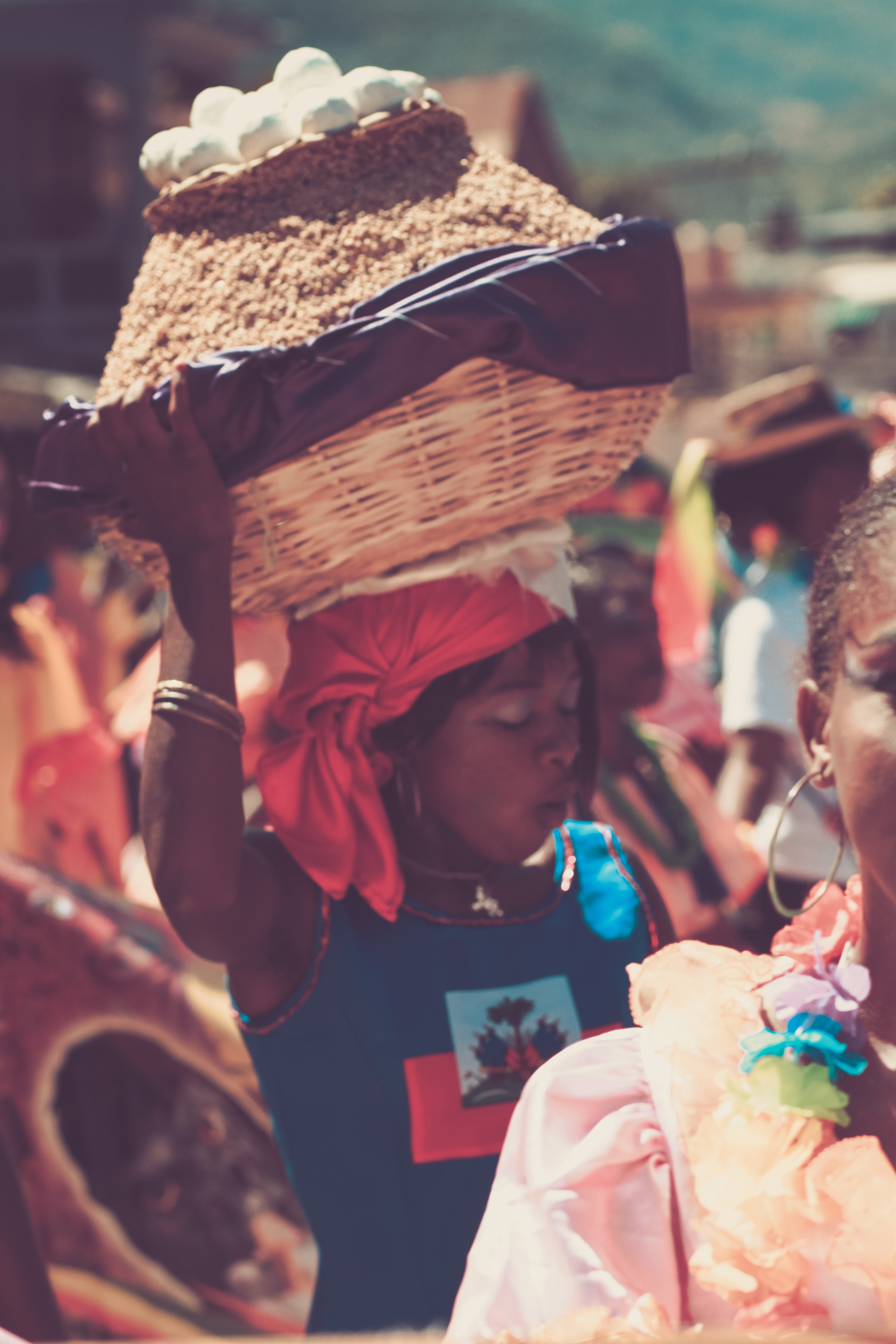
- Afro-Haitian woman at Kanaval.

Total population
- c. 11.2 million est

Regions with significant populations
- Haiti

Languages
- Haitian Creole 90% French 10% Frespañol

Religion
- Majority: Christianity ~83.2% Minority: Haitian Vodou • Others

Related ethnic groups
- Afro-Caribbean, African people, French Haitians, Syrian Haitians, German Haitians, Mestizo, Cajuns, Mulatto Haitians, Saint-Domingue Creoles, White Haitians, Indo-Haitians, Chinese Haitians, Zambo, Indo-Caribbean people, Arab Haitians, Italian Haitians, Haitian Cubans, Haitian Chileans, Haitian Brazilians, Haitian diaspora

Afro-Haitians or Black Haitians (French: Afro-Haïtiens or Haïtiens Noirs; Haitian Creole: Afwo-Ayisyen, Ayisyen Nwa) are Haitians who have ancestry from any of the Black racial groups of Africa. They form the largest racial group in Haiti and together make up the largest subgroup of Afro-Caribbean people.

The majority of Afro-Haitians are descendants of west and central Africans brought to the island by the French and Spanish Empire to work on plantations. Since the Haitian Revolution, Afro-Haitians have been the largest racial group in the country, accounting for 95% of the population in the early 21st century. The remaining 5% of the population is made up of mixed persons (mixed African and European descent) and other minor groups (European, Arab, and Asian descent).

== Haitian nationality ==
According to the Constitution of Haiti, a Haitian citizen is:

- Anyone, regardless of where they are born, is considered Haitian if either their mother or father is a native-born citizen of Haiti. A person born in Haiti could automatically receive citizenship.
- A foreigner living in Haiti who has had a continuous period of Haitian residence for five years can apply for citizenship and will have the right to vote, but is not eligible to hold public office until five years after their date of naturalization, excluding those offices reserved for native-born Haitians by Constitutional law.

== History ==
The Island of Ayiti was inhabited by the Indigenous Arawak Peoples: Taíno, Ciguayo and the Siboney. Italian explorer Christopher Columbus sighted the Island on 6 December 1492. He named it La Isla Española ("The Spanish Island"), later Anglicized as Hispaniola. The Spanish controlled the Island from 1492 to 1697. The French took control in the Treaty of Ryswick and renamed the western portion of the island as Saint-Domingue, of what will later become known as Haiti, while the other still maintained their Spanish colony in the eastern two thirds of what later became the Captaincy General of Santo Domingo.

The French Colonial empire had many colonies in the Caribbean known as the French West Indies
Haiti	French Guiana	Guadeloupe	Martinique	Saint Barthélemy	Saint Martin	Dominica	Saint Lucia

Slavery supported their plantation economy in which Saint-Domingue was their most important. Between 1681 and 1791 the labor for these plantations was provided by an estimated 790,000 or 860,000 slaves, to produce sugar, coffee, cacao, indigo, and cotton. The slave system in Saint-Domingue was considered brutal, with high levels of both mortality and violence.

== Origins ==
The enslaved African population of Haiti derived from various areas, spanning from Senegal to the Congo. Most of which were brought from West Africa, with a considerable number also brought from Central Africa. Some of these enslaved ethnic groups include those from the former Kongo kingdom (BaKongo), Senegambia (Mandinka, Fulani, and Wolof), Benin and Togo (Fon, Aja, Ewe, Yoruba). There were also many Igbo people from the Bight of Biafra, in south-east Nigeria. Many people can also trace much of their DNA from the native people. Others in Haiti were brought from Senegal, Guinea (imported by the Spanish since the sixteenth century and then by the French), Sierra Leone, Windward Coast, Angola, Cameroon, Nigeria, Ghana, Togo, and Southeast Africa (such as the Bara tribesmen of Madagascar, who were brought to Haiti in the eighteenth century).

== Demography ==
The population of Haiti is 9.9 million, of which 80% are of African descent while 15-20% is mulatto and white. Slavery in Haiti was established by the Spanish and French colonialists. Many Haitians are descendants of Indigenous peoples who cohabited with the African descendant population.

Haiti is an Afro-Latin nation with strong African contributions to the culture as well as its language, music and religion with a fusion of French and Indigenous, with a sizable degree of Spaniard; all relate and are not limited to its food, art, music, folk religion and other customs. Arab customs are also present in their society today.

Although Haiti averages approximately 250 people per square kilometre (650 per sq mi.), its population is concentrated most heavily in urban areas, coastal plains, and valleys. Haiti's population was about 11 million according to UN 2018 estimates, with half of the population being under 20 years old. The first formal census, taken in 1950, showed a population of 3.1 million.

According to The World Factbook, 95% of Haitians are primarily of African descent; the remaining 5% of the population are mostly of mixed-race and European background, and a number of other ethnicities.

=== Genetics ===
===== Y-Chromosomal DNA =====
Afro-Haitians, who were sampled in 2012, were found to have carried haplogroup E1b1a-M2 (63.4%), within which were more specific sub-haplogroups, such as haplogroups E1b1a7-M191 (26.8%) and E1b1a8-U175 (26%), and subgroups within those sub-haplogroups, such as E1b1a7a-U174 (26.8%) and E1b1a8a-P278 (13%); there were also various sub-haplogroups of haplogroup R1b (e.g., R1b1b1-M269, R1b1b1a1b2-M529, R1b1b1a1b*-S116, R-M306, R1b2*-V88) as well as haplogroup R1a-M198.

===== Autosomal DNA =====
The ancestry of Afro-Haitians, who were sampled in 2013, were found to be 84% African.

== Culture ==
Culture, religion and social organization are the result in Haiti of a process of syncretism between French and African traditions.

=== Religion ===
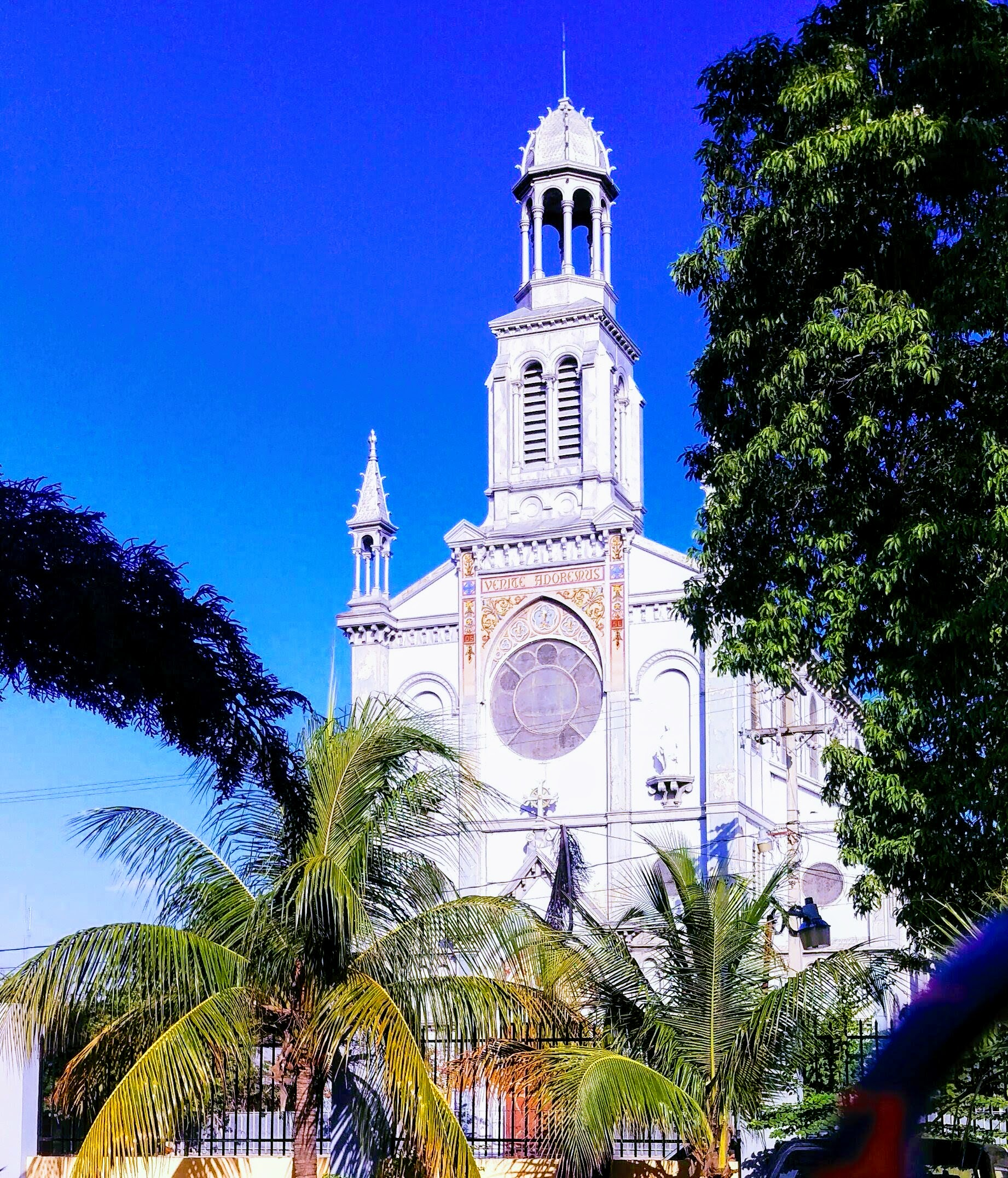
Eglise de Saint Louis in Port-au-Prince, Haiti

Religion in Haiti (2020 Census) 11.6 million total population
Religion	Percentage
Roman Catholicism	65.9%
Protestant	19%
Independent Christians	9%
Other Religions	0.7%
No religion	2.8%
Haitian Vodou	2.7%

==== Christianity ====
- Roman Catholicism:

A majority of the population identifies as Catholic. At 35%, the Catholic Church holds historical and cultural significance in Haiti.

- Independent Christians:

52% of the population are Independents/ non-denominational:

  - Protestants make up 19% including: Baptist, and Pentecostal
  - Others: Episcopalian, Methodist, Seventh-day Adventist, and Jehovah’s Witness

===== Haitian Vodou and Ibo Loa =====
- Syncretism:

Many Haitians, particularly those who identify as Catholic, also practice Vodou, a syncretic religion that blends elements of West African religions and indigenous Haitian traditions.

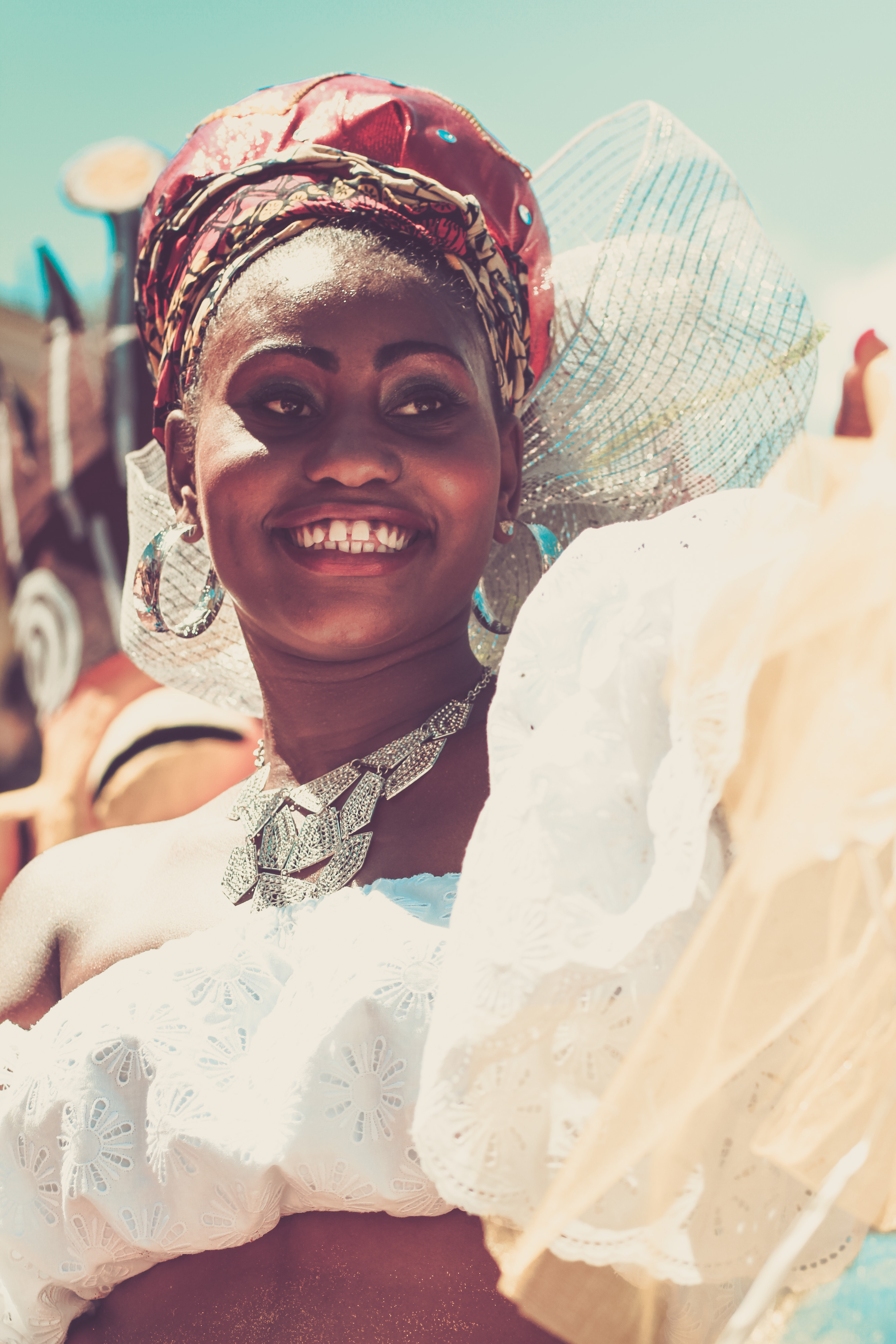
Kanaval in Jacmel, Haiti, February 2014

A small minority (2%) cultural practice in Haiti is originated from the African diaspora religions of Ancestor worship. This probably originated from the synchronicities and blending of these cultures:

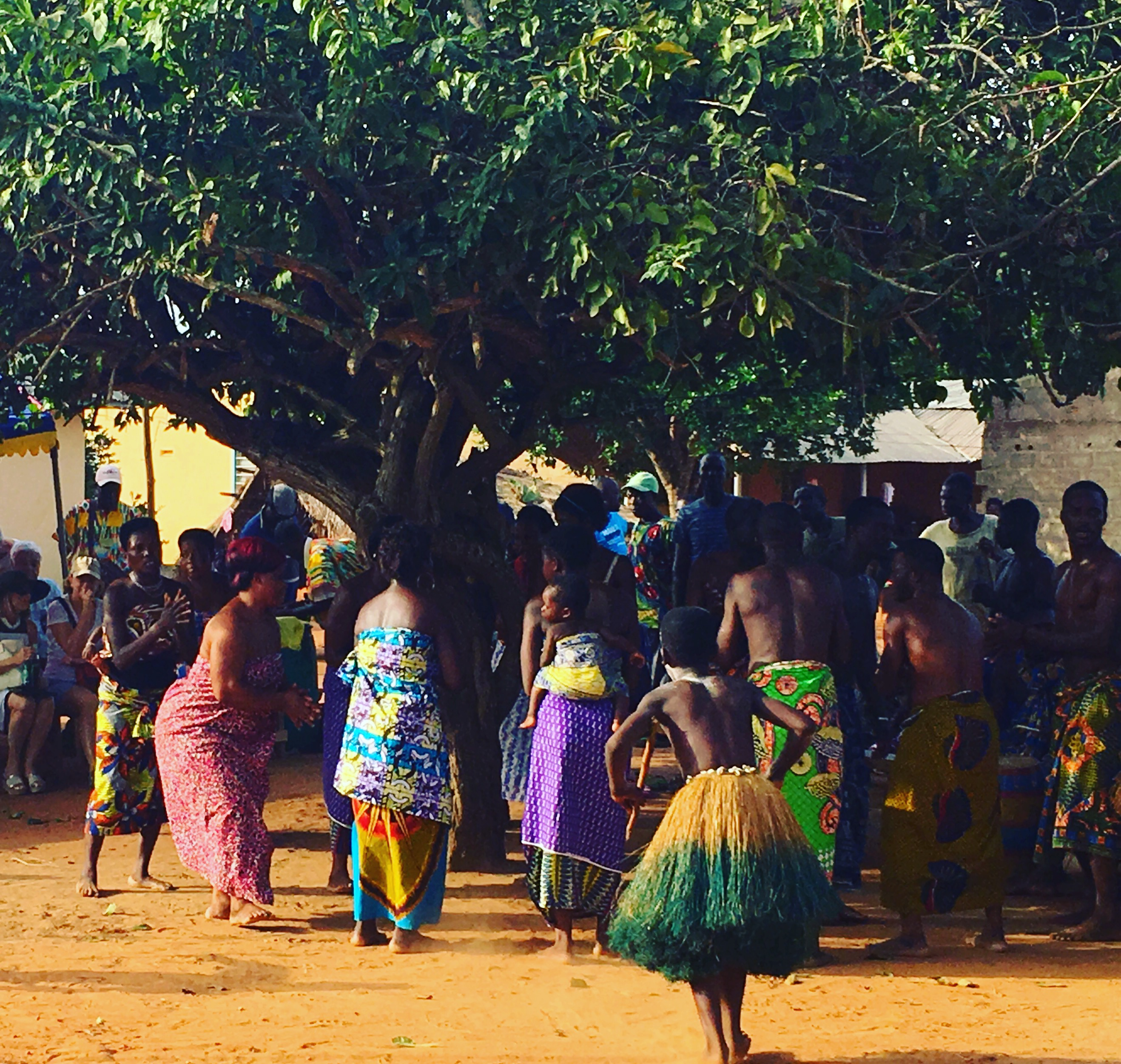
Voodoo Moves

- Bakongo
  - The entire northern area of Haiti is influenced by the practices of the Kongo, often called Rites Congo or Lemba.
  - In the south, the Congo influence is called Petwo (Petro). Many loa are of Congolese origin, such as Basimbi and Lemba.
- Taíno

The Zemi system

- Fon religion has largely contributed to Haitian Vodou, by the incorporation of Dahomey's deities and Priesthood.
- Yoruba Orisa system is present in the manifestations of orishas like Shango, Ogun, and Oshun, among others.
- Other West and Central African nations.

==== Minority religions ====
===== Judaism =====
A small Jewish community exists in Haiti, with a history dating back to the colonial period.

===== Islam =====
There is a small Muslim community in Haiti, primarily composed of converts and descendants of former Muslim slaves. Three branches of Islam in the country: Sunni, Shia, and Ahmadiyya

===== Bahá'í Faith =====
There is a small but growing Bahá'í community in Haiti.

=== Languages ===
Two languages are spoken in Haiti. French is taught in schools and known by about 42% of the population, but spoken by a minority of black and biracial residents, in Port-au-Prince and other cities. Haitian Creole, with roots in French, Spanish, Taíno, Portuguese, English, and African languages, is a language with dialectal forms in different regions. It is spoken throughout the country, but is used extensively in rural areas.

=== Music ===
The music of Haiti combines a wide range of influences drawn from the many people who have settled on this Caribbean island. It reflects French, African rhythms, Spanish elements and others who have inhabited the island of Hispaniola and minor Native Taíno influences. Youth attend parties at nightclubs called discos, (pronounced "deece-ko"), and attend Bal. This term is the French word for ball, as in a formal dance. Styles of music unique to the nation of Haiti include music derived from Vodou ceremonial traditions and Méringue, Rara parading music, Twoubadou ballads, Mini-jazz rock bands, Rasin movement, Hip hop Kreyòl, and Compas. Compas, short for compas direct, is a complex, ever-changing music that arose from African rhythms and European ballroom dancing, mixed with Haiti's bourgeois culture. It is a refined music, with méringue as its basic rhythm. In Creole, it is spelled as konpa dirèk or simply konpa, however it is commonly spelled as it is pronounced as kompa.

The first recorded song in Haiti was "Fèy," a traditional Vodou folk song recorded by Jazz Guignard and RAM, a Haitian record label, in 1937. One of the most celebrated Haitian artists today is Wyclef Jean. Wyclef Jean, however, left the country before his teenage years and began the Fugees with Lauryn Hill and Pras, who together went on to become the biggest selling hip hop group of all time with The Score released in 1996.

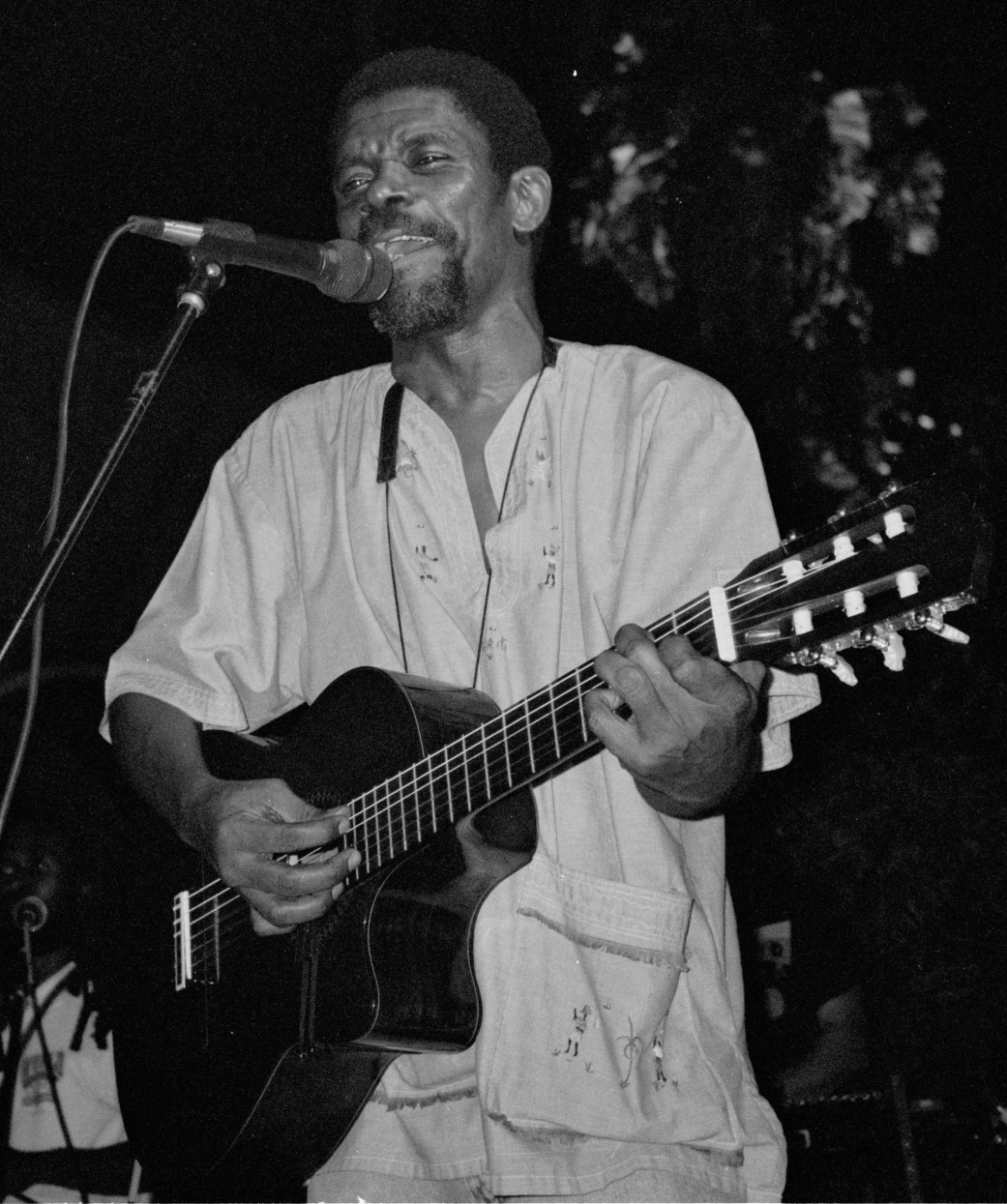
Haitian folk singer Manno Charlemagne

Haitian music combines a wide range of influences drawn from the many people who have settled on this Caribbean island. It reflects French, African rhythms, Spanish elements and others who have inhabited the island of Hispaniola and minor Indigenous influences. Styles of music unique to the nation of Haiti include music derived from Vodou ceremonial traditions, rara parading music, twoubadou ballads, mini-jazz rock bands, rasin movement, hip hop kreyòl, the wildly popular compas, and méringue as its basic rhythm.

Very popular today is compas, short for compas direct, made popular by Nemours Jean-Baptiste, on a recording released in 1955. The name derives from compás, the Spanish word meaning rhythm or tones. It involves mostly medium-to-fast tempo beats with an emphasis on electric guitars, synthesizers, and either a solo alto saxophone, a horn section or the synthesizer equivalent. In Creole, it is spelled as konpa dirèk or simply konpa. It is commonly spelled as it is pronounced as kompa.

=== Dance ===
Dancing is an important part of Haitian social life. Used for celebrations such as church socials and informal parties, rituals, as well as evenings out with friends. In small restaurants, social dance music is provided by relatively small twoubadou groups, while larger clubs with big dance floors often feature dance bands reminiscent of the Tropicana Club of Havana, Cuba. Social dance music has been one of the most heavily creolized music forms in Haiti. Creolized dance forms mixed from African traditions, Indigenous, European and developed distinct local origins:

- European dance forms such as the contradanse (kontradans), quadrille, waltz, and polka were introduced to white planter audiences during the colonial period.
- In the case of Vodou, the spiritual belief is usually accompanied by dancing, singing, and drumming rooted from the dance styles of African dance.

In the decades after 1804, when Haiti became the first independent black republic, southern whites in the United States were concerned that the example of a successful slave insurrection would inspire a similar revolt on their plantations. Since the early nineteenth century, then, white U.S. fiction about Haiti has been concerned with the depiction of Haitians as savages, consumed by a thirst for white blood. Negative stereotyping of Haitians by white writers has persisted to the present in the form of movies and books that transform the religion of Haitians from a healing ceremony into a satanic ritual.

— Peter Manuel Michael, Caribbean Currents: Caribbean Music from Rumba to Reggae
- Carnival and rara celebrations feature exuberant dancing and movement in the streets that originate from Catholic celebrations.
- One of the most popular African-influenced dance styles was the méringue (mereng in Creole). Along with the carabinier, the méringue was a favorite dance style of the Haitian elite and was a regular feature at elite dances. The Haitian expression, Mereng ouvri bal, mereng fème bal; (The mereng opens the ball, the mereng closes the ball) alludes to the popularity and ubiquity of the méringue.

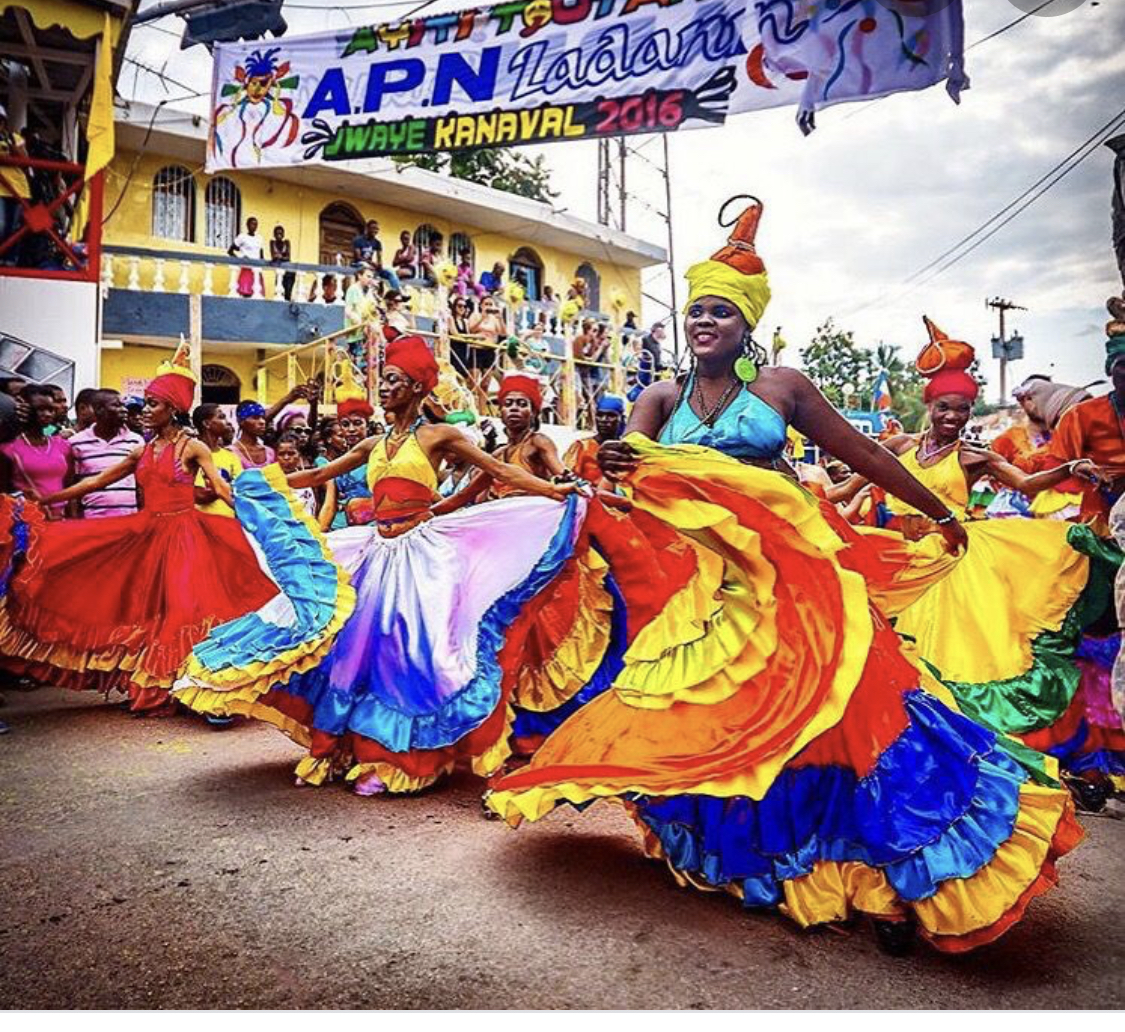
Haitian Carnival (Kanaval)

Haitian Carnival (Haitian Creole: Kanaval, French: Carnaval) is a celebration held over several weeks each year leading up to Mardi Gras. Haitian Defile Kanaval is the Haitian Creole name of the main annual Mardi Gras carnival held in Port-au-Prince, Haiti.

The parade is known as "Kye Marn". Haiti's largest carnival is held in the capital and largest city, Port-au-Prince, with smaller celebrations taking part simultaneously in Jacmel, Aux Cayes, and other locations in Haiti. The annual carnival celebrations coincide with other Mardi Gras carnivals around the world.

Haiti also has smaller carnival celebrations during the year that are separate from the main carnival. These include Rara, a series of processions taking place during the Catholic Lent season, that has bands and parades like the larger main carnival, and also an annual Carnaval des Fleurs, that takes place on 7 July.

=== Cuisine ===
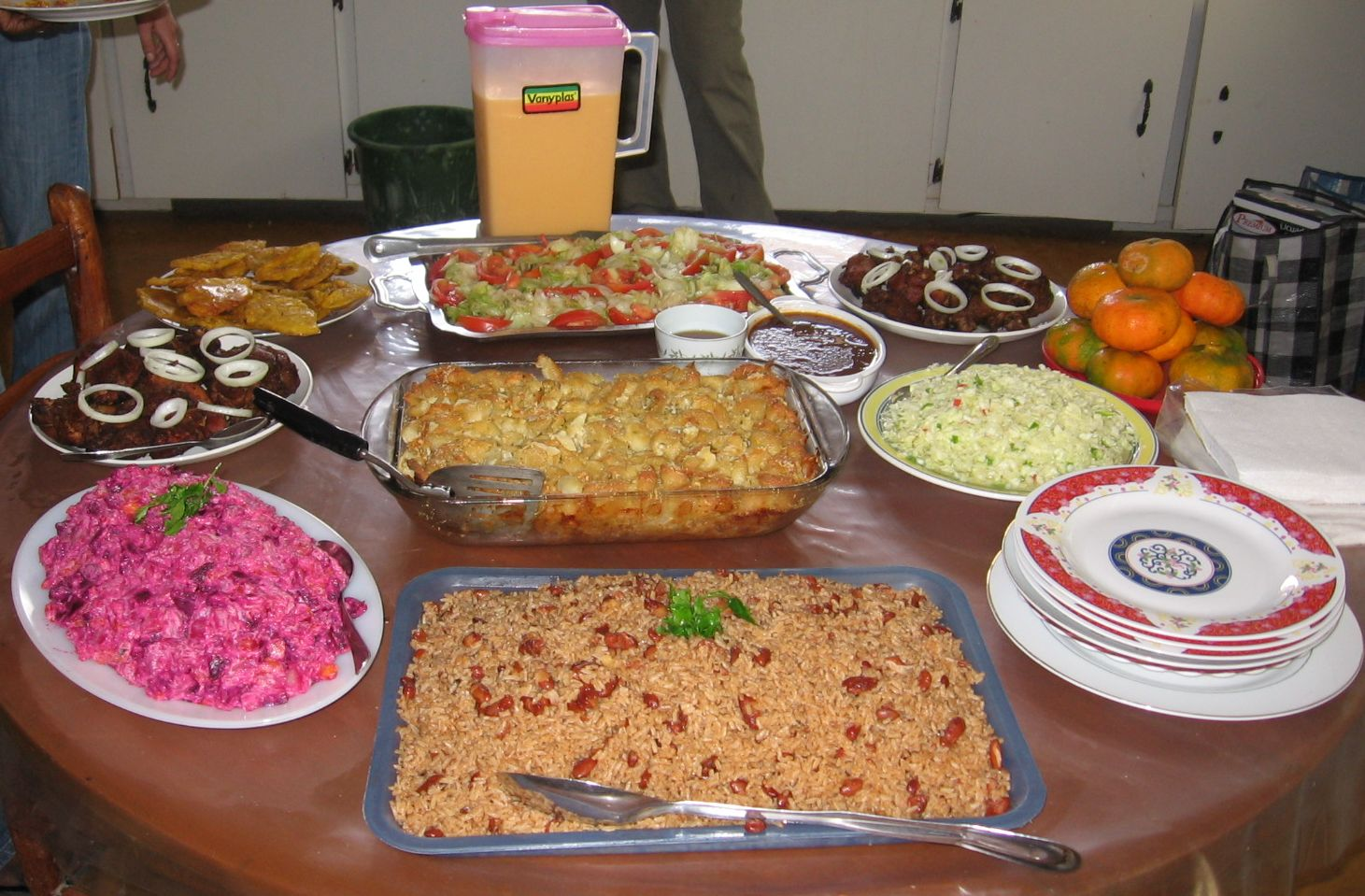
Haitian food

Haitian cuisine is a Creole cuisine that originates from a blend of several culinary styles that populated the western portion of the island of Hispaniola, namely African, French, Indigenous, Spanish, and Levantine influences. Haitian cuisine has some similarities with "criollo" (Spanish for 'creole') cooking and similar to other Caribbean cuisine, but differs in several ways from its regional counterparts. Flavors are bold and spicy, demonstrating African and French influences, with notable derivatives coming from Indigenous and Spanish techniques.

Levantine influences have made their way into the mainstream culture, due to an Arab migration over the years forming a community of shared Arab descent. Years of adaptation have led to these cuisines to merge into Haitian cuisine.

== Notable people ==
- Dutherson Clerveaux
- Hannes Delcroix
- Samuel Dalembert
- Mikaël Cantave
- Wyclef
- Fabrice Noël
- Jhondly van der Meer
- Kodak Black
- Garcelle Beauvais
- Suzanne Comhaire-Sylvain
- Michel DeGraff

== See also ==
- Americans in Haiti
- Haitian Americans
- Haiti–United States relations
- Marabou
- Haitian emigration
- Haitians
- Haitian Revolution
- Slavery in Haiti
- Afro-Dominicans
- Afro-Latin Americans
- Afro-Caribbean
- African diaspora
- Haitian diaspora
- History of West Africa
- History of Central Africa
- Black people
- France–Haiti relations
- White Haitians
- French Haitians
- Mulatto Haitians
- Haitians in France
