= Haitians in Venezuela =

People of Haitian heritage and diaspora living in Chile

Haitian Venezuelan Haitiano Venezolano Haïtiene-Vénézuélien Ayisyen Venezwelyen
Total population
- 10,000 to 30,000 (2011)

Regions with significant populations
- Caracas

Languages
- Spanish, Haitian Creole, French

Religion
- Roman Catholicism, Evangelicalism, Haitian Vodou

Related ethnic groups
- Haitians, Haitian Americans, Haitian Brazilians, Haitian Canadians, Haitian Cubans, Haitian Bahamians

Haitians in Venezuela (Spanish: Haitiano venezolano, French: Haïtiene-vénézuélien, Haitian Creole: Ayisyen venezwelyen) consist of migrants from Haiti and their descendants living in Venezuela.

== History ==
Although Haitians have been part of Venezuela's history before it became an independent republic, they emerged as a significant migrant group starting in the 1960s. The primary reasons for Haitian migration are the country's disadvantaged socioeconomic conditions and low quality of life. Another pivotal factor is the 2010 Haiti earthquake, which left more than 316,000 people dead, 350,000 injured, and 1.5 million homeless.

According to the Jesuit Refugee Service, a significant number of Haitians are in Venezuela without any form of legal documentation. Around 40% of these immigrants were in a state of legal limbo in 2010. This situation persists despite a decree issued that same year — following the devastating earthquake — by then President Hugo Chávez, which granted Haitians broad access to legal status. That legal measure aimed to enable all Haitians to obtain visas, thereby allowing them to access the various social benefits guaranteed to workers in the country.

== Demographics ==
The majority are located in Caracas, generally in working-class areas or neighborhoods. These groups are found in areas such as Carapita (Antímano parish) and Catia (Sucre parish), working as ice cream vendors, cooks, and street hawkers. Those with some technical training settled in Valencia and Maracay in search of industrial employment. The exact number of Haitians in Venezuela is unknown; estimates range from approximately 20,000 according to the Haitian embassy in Venezuela, to 10,000 according to SAIME, and 30,000 according to non-governmental organizations and aid associations.

== Relations ==
Venezuela has a Haitian embassy in Altamira, Caracas.
