= Haitian Swiss =

Haitians in Switzerland
Total population
- 4,000

Regions with significant populations
- Geneva, Vaud, Neuchâtel, Bern and Zürich

Languages
- French, German, Italian, Romansh, and Haitian Creole

Related ethnic groups
- Haitians, Haitian Americans, Haitian Canadian, Haitian Brazilian, Haitian Chilean, Haitian Cuban

Haitians in Switzerland (French: Suisso-haïtienne, Haitian Creole: Swis ayisyen) consists of migrants from Haiti and their descendants living in Switzerland. The Haitian diaspora is present in virtually all of Switzerland, with strong concentrations in the cantons of Geneva, Vaud, Neuchâtel, Bern and Zürich with roughly 20 associations present on the communal and cultural scene. Particularly in Geneva, a French-speaking canton, the Haitian community is made up of health professionals, artists, technicians, laborers, lawyers, entrepreneurs, employed students, diplomats and the involvement of local politics, and international civil servants. The small population of Haitians and their descendants have maintained a positive reputation in the country, excelling notably in several fields such as non-governmental organizations, hospitality and the medical sector.

== History ==
The initial wave of emigration came in 1957, when Haitian nationals many of whom were among the intellectual elite or middle class were either exiled or sought to seek political asylum from Papa Doc, who became President of Haiti. Geneva was a popular destination by emigrants out of all the cantons, mainly due to the shared common language of French and its status as an international city within a country that was popularly known as a safe haven for peace and prosperity.

In the 1960s, the Haitian population in Switzerland was 30, with roughly 21 being in Geneva according to national statistics. Among these in Geneva, they were either non-diplomatic international civil servants or students on a state scholarship and/or were afforded to them by their parents. In 1965, the number of Haitians in Geneva increased from 21 to 71 and then to 85 towards the end of 1980.

This population increased to nearly 300 in 1998 and could be explained by the recruitment of Haitian nurses by the Swiss authorities in the 1980s who sought out a qualified workforce to deal with an insufficient number of qualified hospital personnel with 203 being registered as nurses in 1985. In 1989, Geneva had 213 Haitians, 102 of whom had a renewable residence permit, 89 already in possession of permanent residency, 21 international civil servants and mixed unions factoring into the equation.

In 2009, the number of Haitians in Switzerland was estimated to be around 1,500 people, which included 500 with a valid residence permit, 800 naturalization cases since 1981, 180 adopted children (since 1980), 37 international civil servants and roughly 100 without legal status.

In 2018, according to a representative of the permanent mission of Haiti to the UN, Pierre André Dunbar, the number of Haitians and their descendants has risen to 4,000.

== Culture ==
Culture of Haiti in Switzerland has struggled to influence the country en masse due to the relatively small community of Haitians and descendants and the majority have assimilated into the society of Switzerland at-large.

The Haitian cuisine is usually kept and maintained privately and not commercially, as not one restaurant currently exists in Switzerland.

== Associations ==
- Club Haïtien de Suisse
- Haïti Culture
- Lumière pour Haïti

== Notable Haitians in Switzerland ==
- Alizée Gaillard, supermodel
- Sasha Huber, contemporary artist
- Keeto Thermoncy, football player
- Kim Jaggy, football player
