= Haitians =

Inhabitants of Haiti and their descendants in the Haitian diaspora

Haitians Haïtiens / Ayisyen

Regions with significant populations
- Haiti 11,637,398
- United States: 1,138,855
- Dominican Republic: 800,000
- Cuba: 300,000
- Brazil: 199,641 (2025)
- Chile: 188,131 (2023)
- Canada: 178,990 (2021)
- Mexico: 110,000 (2024)
- Bahamas: 80,000
- France: 62,448
- Guyana: 33,500
- Venezuela: 30,000
- Dominica: 7,600
- Turks and Caicos Islands: 6,900
- Suriname: 4,000
- Switzerland: 4,000 (2018)
- Curaçao: 3,000
- Sint Maarten: 2,000
- U.S. Virgin Islands: 1,673
- Belgium: 1,500–2,000
- Argentina: 1,500
- United Kingdom: 1,000
- Ecuador: 1,000
- Aruba: 1,000
- Panama: 1,000
- Netherlands: 594
- Puerto Rico: 536
- Peru: 477 (2007)
- Spain: 262–335
- Italy: 320 (2016)
- Taiwan: 187

Languages
- Haitian French, Haitian Creole, Frespañol

Religion
- Roman Catholic 54.7%, Protestant 28.5%, (Baptist 15.4%, Pentecostal 7.9%, Adventist 3%, Methodist 1.5%, other 0.7%), Vodou 2.1%, other 4.6% none 10.2% (2003 est.)

Related ethnic groups
- African diaspora in the Americas, Afro-Caribbean people, Afro-Latin Americans, Antillean-Caribbean French Creole, Black people, Caribbean people, Black Hispanic and Latino Americans, Hispanic and Latino Americans, Latin American people, Louisiana Creole, Louisiana French, Louisiana Creole people, French Creole, French West Indies, French Canadians, French people, West Indians

Haitians (Haitian Creole: Ayisyen, French: Haïtiens) are the citizens and nationals of Haiti. The Haitian people have their origins in West and Central Africa with the most spoken language being Haitian Creole. The larger Haitian diaspora includes individuals that trace ancestry to Haiti and self-identify as Haitian but are not necessarily Haitian by citizenship. The United States and the Dominican Republic have the largest Haitian populations in the world after Haiti.

An ethnonational group, Haitians generally comprise the modern descendants of self-liberated Africans in the Caribbean territory historically referred to as Saint-Domingue. This includes the mulatto minority who denote corresponding European ancestry, notably from French settlers.

== History ==
The island of Hispaniola was inhabited by multiple Indigenous peoples. Upon Christopher Columbus's arrival on the island, he encountered a kingdom governed by a cacique, or Taíno chief. Spaniards killed, tortured, mutilated and enslaved the Indigenous peoples of the island. Following the arrival of the French people in the seventeenth century, the Indigenous population was exterminated. West Africans were brought by white slave traders for slave labor to cultivate raw materials for global trade.

== Definitions ==
According to the Constitution of Haiti, a Haitian citizen is:

- Anyone, regardless of where they are born, is considered Haitian if either their mother or father is a native-born citizen of Haiti. A person born in Haiti could automatically receive citizenship.
- A foreigner living in Haiti who has had a continuous period of Haitian residence for five years can apply for citizenship and will have the right to vote, but is not eligible to hold public office until five years after their date of naturalization, excluding those offices reserved for native-born Haitians by Constitutional law.

=== Dual citizenship ===
The Haitian Constitution of 2012 re-legalizes dual citizenship, allowing for Haitians living abroad to own land and run for Haitian political office (except for offices of president, prime minister, senator or member of the lower house of Parliament).

== Racial groups ==
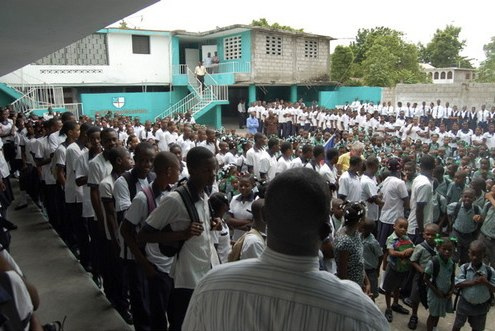
Schoolchildren from Hinche, Centre

Haiti's population is 95% of African descent (5% are of mixed African and other ancestry), though people of many different ethnic and national backgrounds have settled and impacted the country, such as Poles (from Napoleon's Polish legions), Jews, Arabs (from the Arab diaspora), Chinese, Indians,French, Germans (18th century and World War I), Italians, and Spanish, most marrying into the majority black populace and in turn yielding mixed race children (many of whom are prominent in Haitian society).

== Languages ==
The official languages of Haiti are French and Haitian Creole.

Traditionally, the two languages served different functions, with Haitian Creole the informal everyday language of all the people, regardless of social class, and French the language of formal situations: schools, newspapers, the law and the courts, and official documents and decrees. However, because the vast majority of Haitians speak only Creole, there have been efforts in recent years to expand its use. In 1979, a law was passed that permitted Creole to be the language of instruction, and the Constitution of 1983 gave Creole the status of a national language. However, it was only in 1987 that the Constitution granted official status to Creole.

== Culture ==
=== Art ===
Haitian art, known for its vibrant color work and expressive design, is a complex tradition, reflecting strong African roots with European and barely Indigenous American aesthetic and religious influences. It is a very important representation of Haitian culture and history. Haitian art is distinctive, particularly in painting and sculpture where brilliant colors, naive perspective and sly humor characterize it. Frequent subjects in Haitian art include big, delectable foods, lush landscapes, market activities, jungle animals, rituals, dances, and gods. Artists frequently paint in fables.

=== Music ===
The music of Haiti combines a wide range of influences drawn from the many people who have settled on this Caribbean island. It reflects French, African rhythms, Spanish elements and others who have inhabited the island of Hispaniola and minor Native Taíno influences. Youth attend parties at nightclubs called discos, (pronounced "deece-ko"), and attend Bal. This term is the French word for ball, as in a formal dance. Styles of music unique to the nation of Haiti include music derived from Vodou ceremonial traditions and Méringue, Rara parading music, Twoubadou ballads, Mini-jazz rock bands, Rasin movement, Hip hop Kreyòl, and Compas. Compas, short for compas direct, is a complex, ever-changing music that arose from African rhythms and European ballroom dancing, mixed with Haiti's bourgeois culture. It is a refined music, with méringue as its basic rhythm. In Creole, it is spelled as konpa dirèk or simply konpa, however it is commonly spelled as it is pronounced as kompa.

The first recorded song in Haiti was "Fèy," a traditional Vodou folk song recorded by Jazz Guignard and RAM, a Haitian record label, in 1937. One of the most celebrated Haitian artists today is Wyclef Jean. Wyclef Jean, however, left the country before his teenage years and began the Fugees with Lauryn Hill and Pras, who together went on to become the biggest selling hip hop group of all time with The Score released in 1996.

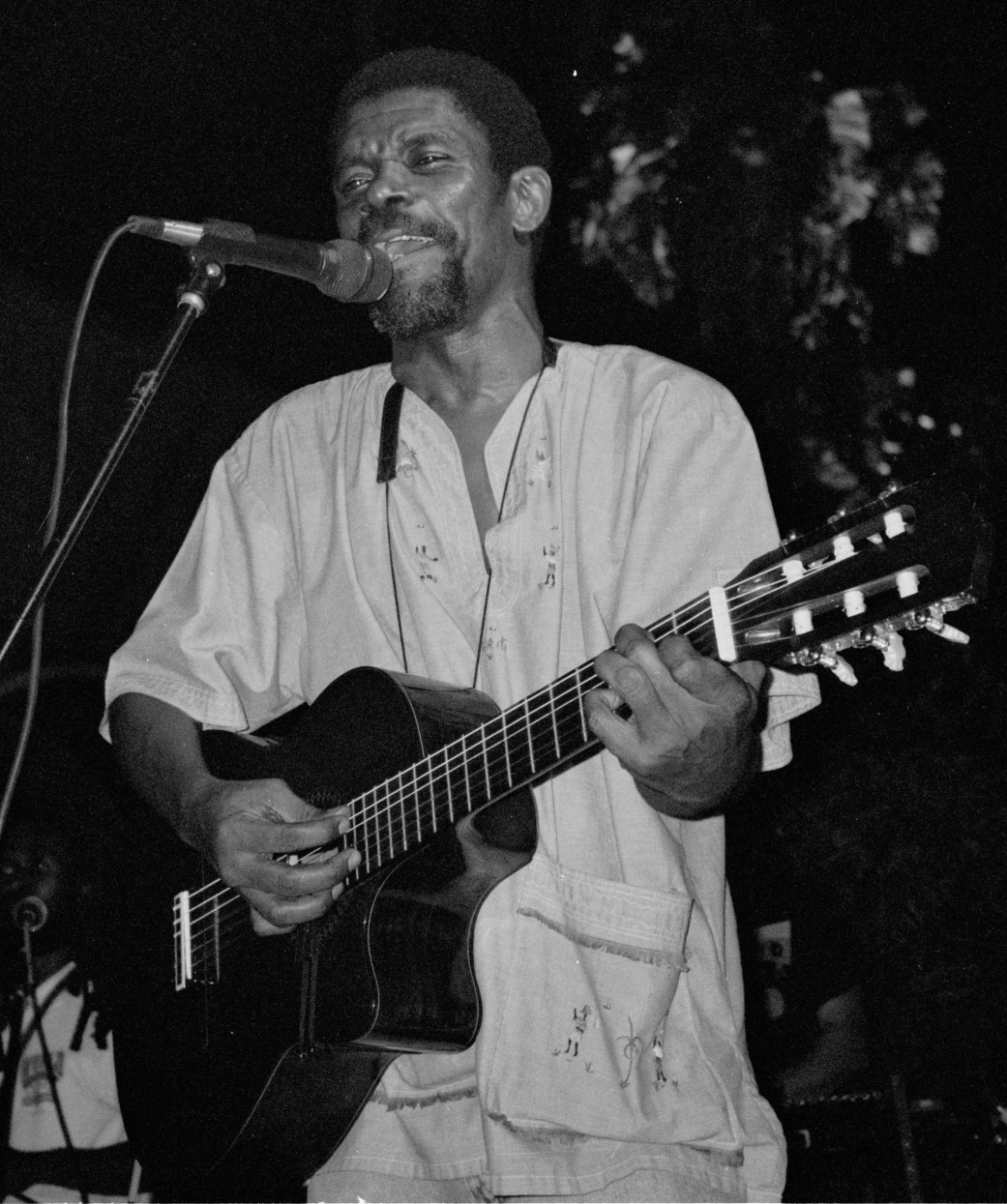
Haitian folk singer Manno Charlemagne

Haitian music combines a wide range of influences drawn from the many people who have settled on this Caribbean island. It reflects French, African rhythms, Spanish elements and others who have inhabited the island of Hispaniola and minor Indigenous influences. Styles of music unique to the nation of Haiti include music derived from Vodou ceremonial traditions, rara parading music, twoubadou ballads, mini-jazz rock bands, rasin movement, hip hop kreyòl, the wildly popular compas, and méringue as its basic rhythm.

Very popular today is compas, short for compas direct, made popular by Nemours Jean-Baptiste, on a recording released in 1955. The name derives from compás, the Spanish word meaning rhythm or tones. It involves mostly medium-to-fast tempo beats with an emphasis on electric guitars, synthesizers, and either a solo alto saxophone, a horn section or the synthesizer equivalent. In Creole, it is spelled as konpa dirèk or simply konpa. It is commonly spelled as it is pronounced as kompa.

=== Dance ===
Dancing is an important part of Haitian social life. Used for celebrations such as church socials and informal parties, rituals, as well as evenings out with friends. In small restaurants, social dance music is provided by relatively small twoubadou groups, while larger clubs with big dance floors often feature dance bands reminiscent of the Tropicana Club of Havana, Cuba. Social dance music has been one of the most heavily creolized music forms in Haiti. Creolized dance forms mixed from African traditions, Indigenous, European and developed distinct local origins:

- European dance forms such as the contradanse (kontradans), quadrille, waltz, and polka were introduced to white planter audiences during the colonial period.
- In the case of Vodou, the spiritual belief is usually accompanied by dancing, singing, and drumming rooted from the dance styles of African dance.

In the decades after 1804, when Haiti became the first independent black republic, southern whites in the United States were concerned that the example of a successful slave insurrection would inspire a similar revolt on their plantations. Since the early nineteenth century, then, white U.S. fiction about Haiti has been concerned with the depiction of Haitians as savages, consumed by a thirst for white blood. Negative stereotyping of Haitians by white writers has persisted to the present in the form of movies and books that transform the religion of Haitians from a healing ceremony into a satanic ritual.

— Peter Manuel Michael, Caribbean Currents: Caribbean Music from Rumba to Reggae
- Carnival and rara celebrations feature exuberant dancing and movement in the streets that originate from Catholic celebrations.
- One of the most popular African-influenced dance styles was the méringue (mereng in Creole). Along with the carabinier, the méringue was a favorite dance style of the Haitian elite and was a regular feature at elite dances. The Haitian expression, Mereng ouvri bal, mereng fème bal; (The mereng opens the ball, the mereng closes the ball) alludes to the popularity and ubiquity of the méringue.

=== Cuisine ===
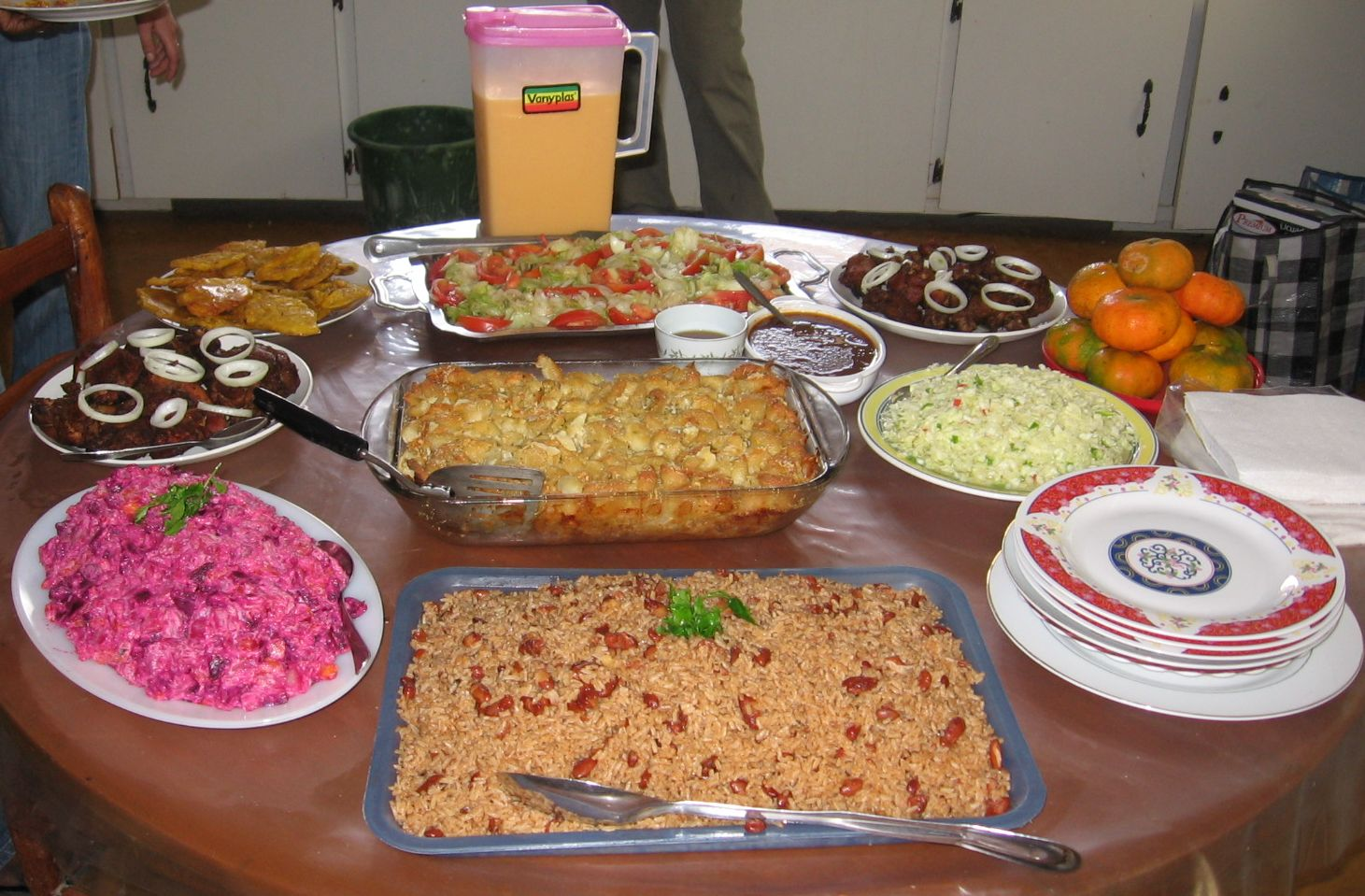
A table set with Haitian cuisine

The French influences in Haiti are present in their cuisine, but more so it is representative of their location in the Caribbean. They do however have their own flavor as a result of the lack of Spanish influence on their island compared to others in the Caribbean. The cooking style used in Haiti is predominately Creole and includes heavy use of pepper in the majority of their dishes. A main staple in Haiti Is starch, and many of their dishes include potatoes, rice, corn, beans, and plantains.

There is also a strong presence of tropical fruits in their cuisine due to their ability to grow in the tropical climate. This includes pineapples, coconuts, mangoes, and other fruits that are used for many dishes and beverages. Food also has importance in religious and status-symbol type forms. Foods that are considered delicacies in Haiti include French inspired cheeses and meats and are a symbol of money and power. Typically these types of meals are only served in the richest part of Haiti, namely in the capital of Port-au-Prince. As far as religious meals go, the Catholics in Haiti typically enjoy more elaborate meals during Christmas Eve.

=== Religion ===
Haiti is similar to the rest of Latin America, in that it is a predominantly Christian country, with 80% Roman Catholic and approximately 16% professing Protestantism. A small population of Muslims and Hindus exists in the country, principally in the capital of Port-au-Prince.

Vodou, encompassing several different traditions, consists of a mix of Central and Western African, European, and Indigenous (Taíno) religions, and is also widely practiced, despite the negative stigma that it carries both in and out of the country. The exact number of Vodou practitioners is unknown; however, it is believed that a small proportion of the population practices it, often alongside their Christian faith. Some secular Christians also have been known to participate in some rituals, although indirectly.

== Migration ==
In 1998, a World Bank estimation claimed that approximately 800,000 Haitian citizens were residents of the Dominican Republic. By 2001, approximately 15,000 Haitians had migrated to the Dominican Republic to work in sugar mills. Haitian workers also migrated to other countries such as the United States, France, Canada, the Bahamas and other Caribbean Islands. In 2006, approximately 800,000 Haitians resided in the United States (especially in the Miami and New York City areas), 60,000 Haitians were living in France (especially Paris), 40,000 in Canada (especially Montreal), while 80,000 were dispersed between the Bahamas and other Caribbean Islands. The Haitian migration has greatly hindered the development of Haiti in comparison to other countries. Some of the country's most skilled individuals have migrated elsewhere; an estimated 70 percent of Haiti's skilled human resources have left Haiti. In the 2010 U.S. Census, 907,790 citizens identified as Haitian immigrants or with their primary ancestry being Haitian. An increase of just over 100,000 Haitians from 2006. The confiscation of property, massacres, and prosecution caused the upper and middle class of Haiti to migrate to more developed countries in Europe and the United States.

== See also ==
- Afro-Caribbean people
- Afro–Latin Americans
- Haitian diaspora
- Haitian emigration
- Afro-Haitians
- Arab Haitians
- Jewish Haitians
- Madan Sara Haitians
- Marabou Haitians
- Maroon Haitians
- Mulatto Haitians
- White Haitians
- American Haitians
- Canadian Haitians
- Chinese Haitians
- French Haitians
- German Haitians
- Indian (Indo) Haitians
- Italian Haitians
- Lebanese Haitians
- Palestinian Haitians
- Polish Haitians
- Syrian Haitians
- Haitian Americans
- Haitian Argentines
- Haitian Brazilians
- Haitian Canadians
- Haitian Chileans
- Haitian French
- Haitian Mexicans
- Haitian Swiss
- Haitian Venezuelans
