= Haitian Argentines =

Haïtiens en Argentine (French) Haitiano-argentinos (Spanish) Ayisyen Ajanten (Haitian Creole)

Total population
- 1,524 (by birth, 2022 census); 15,000 (estimate, 2025)

Regions with significant populations
- Predominantly Rosario, Buenos Aires, Córdoba, Villa María and Mendoza

Languages
- Haitian Creole; French; Spanish

Related ethnic groups
- Haitian diaspora; Afro-Argentines; Haitian Brazilians; Haitians in Chile

Haitian Argentines (Spanish: haitiano-argentinos) are Argentine citizens of partial or full Haitian descent, or Haitian citizens who have migrated to and settled in Argentina.

Haitian migration to Argentina became more visible during the 2010s, especially after the 2010 Haiti earthquake. Argentina became a destination for some young Haitians because of its relatively accessible migration regime, the possibility of humanitarian regularisation and the availability of free public higher education. Haitian communities in Argentina have been particularly associated with the cities of Rosario, Buenos Aires and Córdoba, where students, workers and community organisations have contributed to new forms of Haitian cultural visibility.

== Overview ==
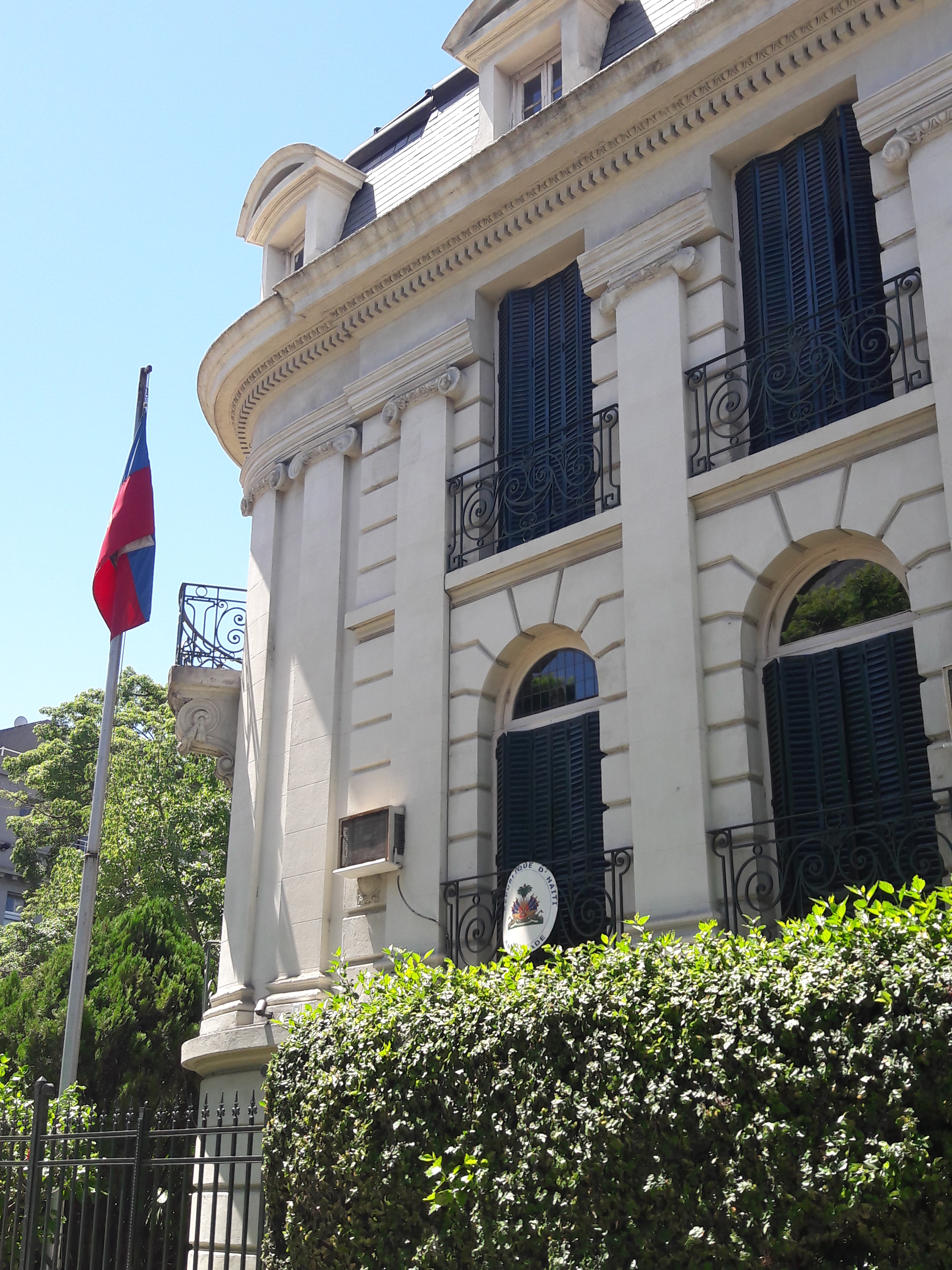
Haitian embassy in Buenos Aires.

After the 2010 earthquake, the Union of South American Nations encouraged member states to implement special regularisation measures for Haitian citizens. Argentina did not create a separate humanitarian visa programme comparable to those adopted by some other South American states, but the category of residence for humanitarian reasons already existed under Argentine migration law. In this context, some Haitians began to consider Argentina as a destination, particularly because of the accessibility of public higher education and the perception that entry and residence would be easier than in other countries.

The Haitian population in Argentina is small compared with Haitian communities in countries such as the United States, Canada, Chile and Brazil. Its exact size is difficult to estimate because Haitian migration in South America has often involved temporary stays, onward movement to other countries and changing legal statuses. According to the 2022 Argentine census, 1,524 Haitian-born people were living in Argentina. This figure likely underestimates the size of the broader Haitian Argentine community, as it only records people born in Haiti and therefore does not include Argentine-born descendants of Haitians. It may also fail to fully reflect Haitians living in the country without regular migration status. Other estimates have placed the Haitian population in Argentina at around 15,000 people.

Between 2015 and 2019 there were 1,358 asylum applications and 2,334 residence permits involving Haitians in Argentina. Of those residence permits, 1,050 were granted under the category of formal student. The National University of Rosario reported 294 Haitian undergraduate and pre-degree students in 2019, while fieldwork in Córdoba identified around 50 Haitian students at the National University of Córdoba and the National Technological University.

Many Haitian migrants arrived in Argentina by air and initially entered under tourist or temporary categories before attempting to regularise their status through study, humanitarian or other residence channels. Documentation, housing, employment and access to education have been among the most frequently reported difficulties.

In June 2026, Haitian Argentine footballer Stephen Ramos became the first player born in Haiti to be called up to represent Argentina.

=== Documentation and legal status ===
Access to documentation has been a recurrent issue for Haitian migrants in Argentina. Residence processes can turn complex because many Haitians arrive to Argentina as tourists and later attempt to obtain temporary residence through humanitarian or student categories before receiving an Argentine national identity card. Individual cases have also been documented by public institutions. In 2023, the Ombudsperson's Office of Buenos Aires Province reported the case of a Haitian man who had entered Argentina as a refugee in 2018 and spent years without documentation before obtaining his national identity card with institutional assistance.

In August 2018, amid the crisis in Haiti, Argentina introduced a visa requirement for Haitian citizens, including tourist stays of less than three months.

== Geographic distribution ==
Haitians in Argentina are concentrated mainly in large urban centres. Rosario has been described as one of the principal centres of Haitian settlement in the country, with estimates of several thousand Haitian residents and an important student presence at the National University of Rosario.

Other communities have been identified in the City of Buenos Aires, especially in neighbourhoods such as Once, San Telmo, La Boca and Palermo, as well as in Córdoba Province, including Córdoba city and Villa María. There are smaller communities in Mendoza Province and Santa Fe Province, including Rosario.

== Education and employment ==
Education has been one of the major reasons for Haitian migration to Argentina. Many young Haitians chose the country in order to study at public universities, especially in Rosario and Córdoba. The value placed on higher education has also been noted by Haitian migrants themselves, who often reject stereotypes presenting Haiti only through poverty and crisis, and instead emphasise Haiti's intellectual, political and historical traditions.

Despite this, Haitian students have faced difficulties related to language, documentation, recognition of previous studies and economic instability. According to a 2021 study, a number of young Haitians are unable to access or remain in university spaces because of administrative obstacles, institutional practices and an unfavourable economic context.

Employment has frequently been characterised by informality, low wages, unemployment or underemployment. In a 2016 study, CLACSO researcher Irene Duffard identified six major areas of difficulty for Haitians in Argentina: work, housing, documentation, education, culture and discrimination. According to her study, many Haitian migrants experienced prolonged periods of unemployment, unstable and informal jobs, and limited upward mobility, even when they had high levels of education or previous professional experience.

== Community and culture ==
Haitian community organisations have played an important role in cultural visibility, language teaching and mutual support. In Rosario, the Asociación Civil Haitiana de Rosario was founded in 2016 and has participated in cultural and linguistic activities, including workshops in Spanish and Haitian Creole, participation in local collective festivals and the organisation of intercultural events.

Since 2021, the Festi Kreyòl has been held in Rosario as an intercultural Haitian-Rosario event celebrating Haitian Creole language and Haitian culture. The festival was organised through collaboration between the Haitian community, the National University of Rosario and university extension projects. Its first edition took place in Plaza Pringles, in central Rosario, and involved members of the Faculty of Humanities and Arts of the National University of Rosario, the Asociación Civil Haitiana de Rosario, Haitian and Argentine participants, students, teachers and members of the wider public.

The festival has included Haitian music, dance, food and language activities, and has been interpreted by researchers as an example of critical interculturality and university-community engagement. Later editions received greater local visibility, including municipal recognition and the participation of Haitian musical groups based in Rosario.

== Discrimination and challenges ==
Several studies and reports have described Haitian migrants in Argentina as subject to racialization, xenophobia and social exclusion. In a 2020 study, researcher Carina Trabalón argues that the arrival of Haitians, Senegalese and Dominicans during the 2000s and 2010s reconfigured the relationship between race and mobility in Argentine cities, challenging the national myth of a racially white Argentina.

The 2023 National Migrant Survey in Argentina, as reported by El Grito del Sur, found that Haitian respondents reported one of the highest levels of discrimination among migrant groups surveyed. The same report linked discrimination to labour precarity, documentation problems, access to education and housing difficulties.

== See also ==
- Haitian diaspora
  - South–South migration
- Afro-Argentines
- Immigration to Argentina
- Argentina–Haiti relations
- Haitians in Chile
- Haitian Brazilians
