= Haitian Mexicans =

Ayisyen Meksiken (Haitian Creole); Hatiano Mexicanos (Spanish); Haïtiens-Mexicain (French)
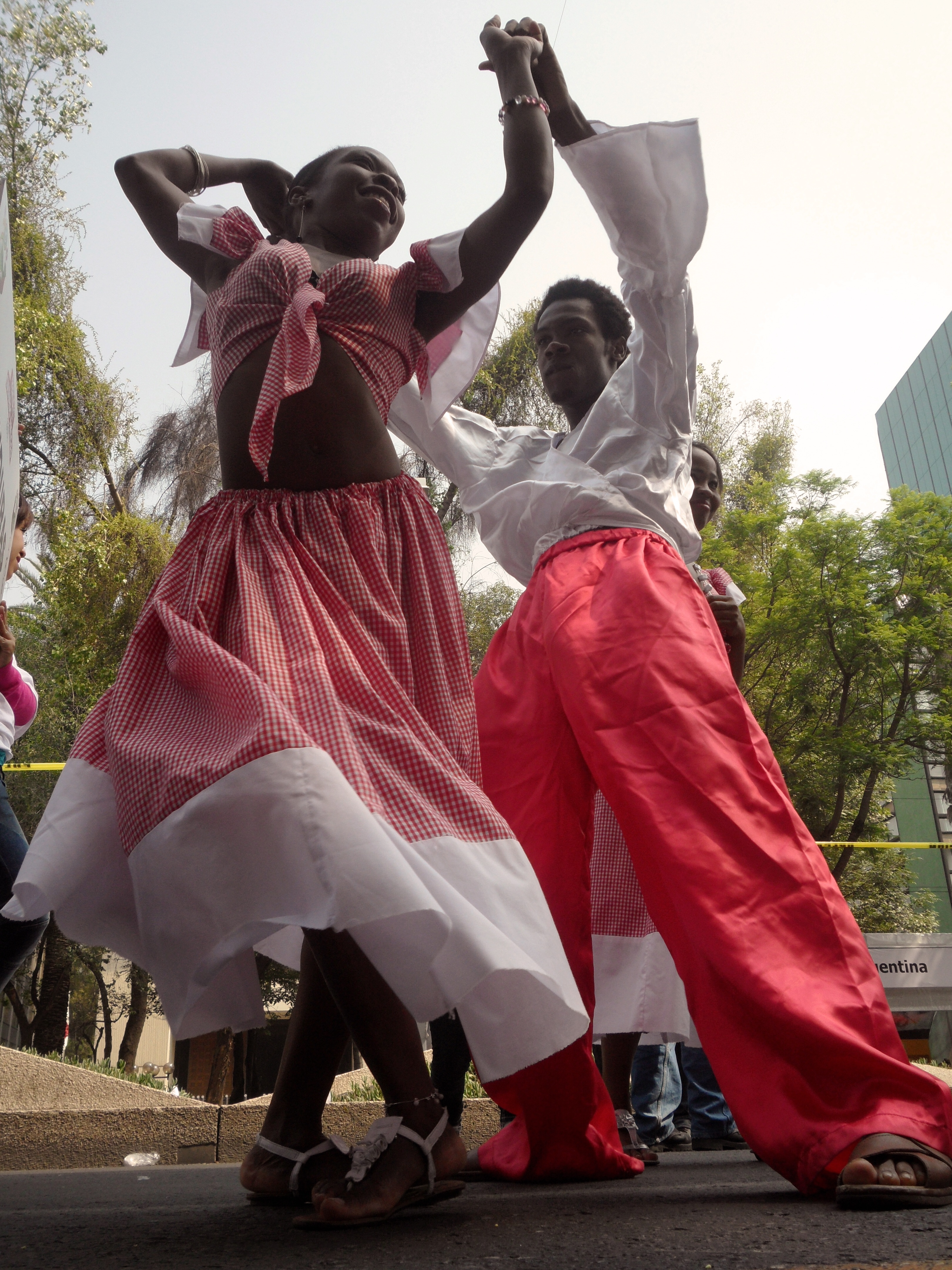
- Haitian dancers at the 2011 Feria de las Culturas Amigas in Mexico City

Total population
- 110,000 Haitian-born residents, (2024); Unknown number of Mexicans of Haitian descent

Regions with significant populations
- Mainly at urban areas but mostly on Mexico City, Guadalajara, Tijuana, Tapachula, Mexicali, Coatzacoalcos, Ciudad Juárez, Monterrey, Pachuca, Culiacán and León. Some live in Oaxaca.

Languages
- Mexican Spanish, French, Haitian Creole.

Religion
- Roman Catholicism, Haitian Vodou

Related ethnic groups
- Haitians, Haitian Americans, Haitian Brazilian, Haitian Canadians, Haitian Chilean

There is a large Haitian diaspora in Mexico. According to a 2021 report, there are approximately 71,559 Haitian-born people living in Mexico.

== History ==
An amount of Haitians moved to Mexico during the presidency of François Duvalier in the 1970s, and relocated to Mexico City and other cities.

After the 2010 Haitian earthquake, 324 Haitians relocated to Mexico via a Mexican naval ship from January 12 to late April 2010. According to the National Migration Institute (INM), each Haitian would be granted a "humanitarian visa", allowing them to work and study in Mexico, use public services, and travel to and from the country. The Haitians settled primarily in Mexico City, Pachuca, and Monterrey. Most of the Haitians who moved after the earthquake had relatives who were already living in Mexico.

Haitians, as well as other migrants, took up residence in Tijuana, Baja California and Mexicali, Baja California and several other Mexican cities seeking entry to the United States. According to the top immigration official in the state of Baja California, in a span of a few weeks in May and June 2016, stated that a large amount of the migrants arriving in Tijuana came from Haiti, but claim they are from African countries with which Mexico lacks diplomatic relations, in order to avoid being deported by Mexican authorities. In September 2016, United States ended the entry of Haitian migrants as refugees. Many trapped Haitian migrants reluctantly stayed in Mexico settling either in Tijuana or Mexicali rather than attempt to cross into the United States or return to Haiti. They were issued temporary resident cards and the CURP tax identification numbers. The Haitian community has settled in the Divina Providencia neighborhood of the city.

== Demographics ==
There are 940 Haitian-born people living in Mexico, as of 2010, according to the OCED. In 2017, there were approximately 5,000 Haitian-born people living in Mexico, primarily in the border region with the United States.

== See also ==
- Haiti–Mexico relations
- Afro-Mexicans
