= Argentina–Haiti relations =

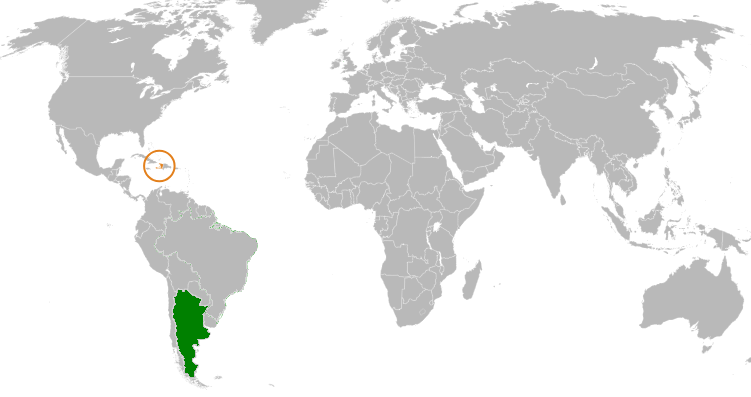

- Argentina: Haiti

Relations between the Argentine Republic and the Republic of Haiti were established in 1948. Argentina maintains an embassy in Port-au-Prince, while Haiti maintains diplomatic representation in Buenos Aires. Both countries are members of the Organization of American States and the Community of Latin American and Caribbean States.

== History ==
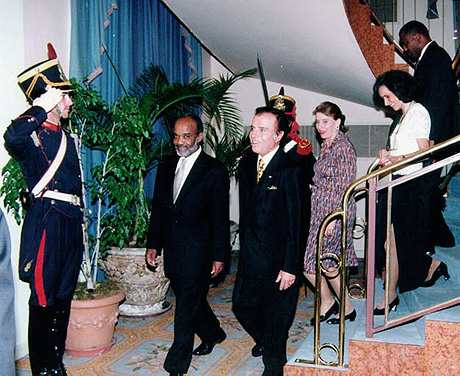
Argentine president Carlos Menem and Haitian president René Préval during a state visit to Buenos Aires in 1997.

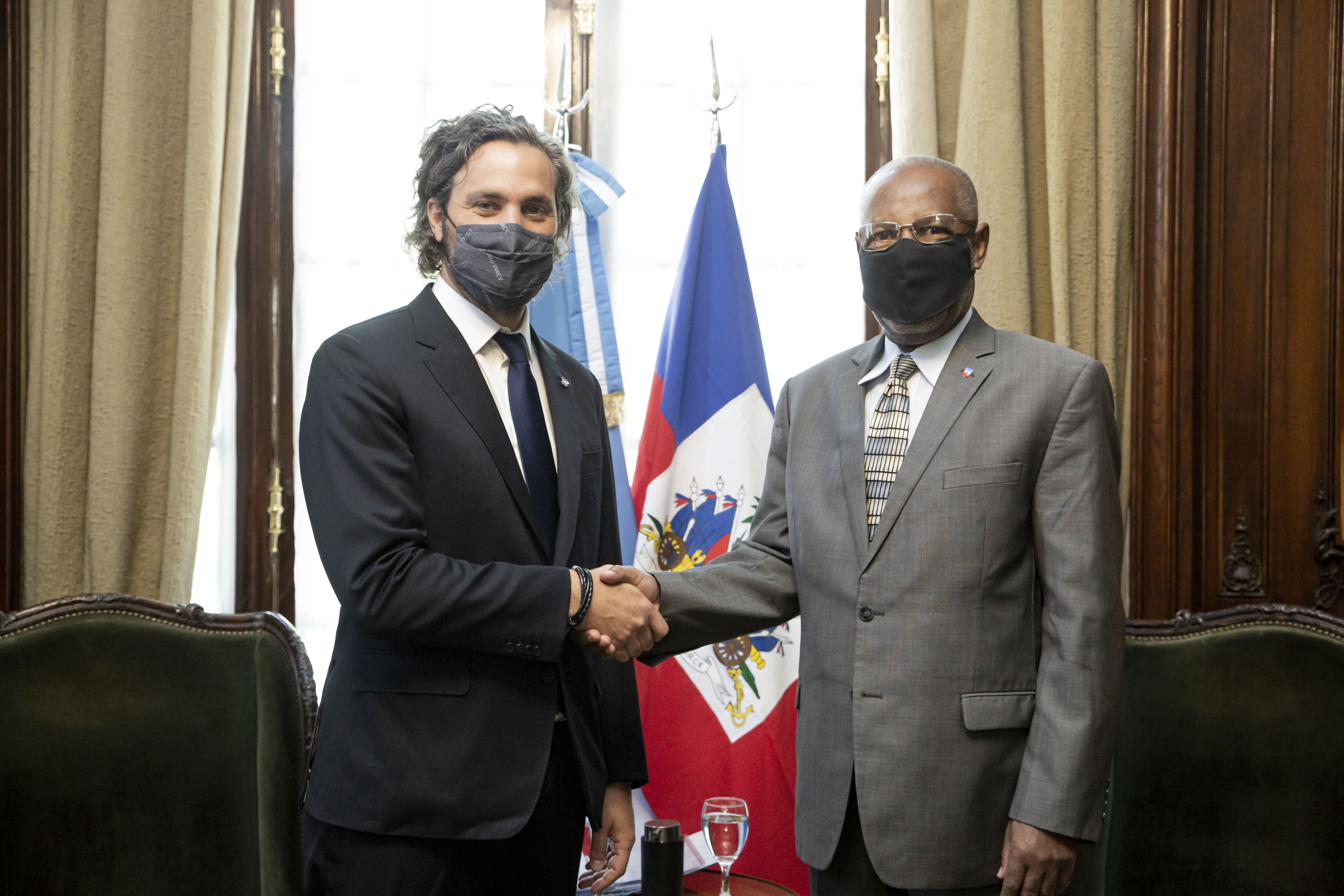
Argentine foreign minister Santiago Cafiero with his Haitian counterpart, Jean Victor Généus, in 2022.

Argentina and Haiti formally established diplomatic relations in 1948, although diplomatic contacts had been established earlier: an envoy sent by the Supreme Director of the United Provinces of South America, Juan Martín de Pueyrredón, arrived in Port-au-Prince in 1816 requesting the recognition of the newly independent United Provinces by Haiti, thus, Haiti became the first state to recognize Argentina's independence from Spain. The two countries established diplomatic relations in the late 1940s. Argentine involvement in Haiti became more visible during the political crises of the late 20th and early 21st centuries. In 1994, President Carlos Menem sent Argentine troops to Haiti as part of the United States-led multinational force deployed after the 1991 coup against President Jean-Bertrand Aristide. Argentina later became a member of the United Nations and Organization of American States groups of friends of Haiti.

Following the resignation of Aristide in February 2004, Argentina took part in international efforts to stabilize Haiti. Its participation included troops in the United Nations Stabilisation Mission in Haiti (MINUSTAH), humanitarian aid, cooperation projects and participation in regional and multilateral forums dealing with the Haitian crisis. The Argentine Congress approved the deployment through Law 25.906 in 2004.

== Peacekeeping and cooperation ==
Argentina contributed military personnel to MINUSTAH and initially focused on stabilization, security, humanitarian assistance and support for elections. Argentine personnel operated in the area of Cap-Haïtien and were involved in patrols, civilian protection and security operations. Argentina also sent humanitarian aid, including food, medicine, clothing, a mobile hospital and a water-treatment plant. During the same period, Argentina developed small-scale socio-economic cooperation projects in Haiti, including community farming projects, the identification of Haitian export products and a sports-and-youth programme.

By 2005, Argentine policy toward Haiti had shifted from a mainly security-and-election approach toward a broader view that linked security, democratization and economic development. Argentina also coordinated with other South American countries, especially Brazil, Chile and Uruguay, through informal regional mechanisms created to coordinate policies toward Haiti.

== Recent relations ==
On 25 January 2023, Argentine president Alberto Fernández met Haitian prime minister Ariel Henry at San Martín Palace in Buenos Aires. Fernández described the relationship as one marked by "historic ties of solidarity" and reiterated Argentina's support for Haiti, including cooperation and humanitarian assistance. Argentine officials linked the initiative to broader regional efforts through the Community of Latin American and Caribbean States (CELAC), including work on a climate adaptation and disaster-response fund.

Argentina exports about US$10 million worth of goods to Haiti each year, including Toyota Hilux motor vehicles, maize and beef. Haitian exports to Argentina amount to around US$80,000 annually.

== Diplomatic missions ==
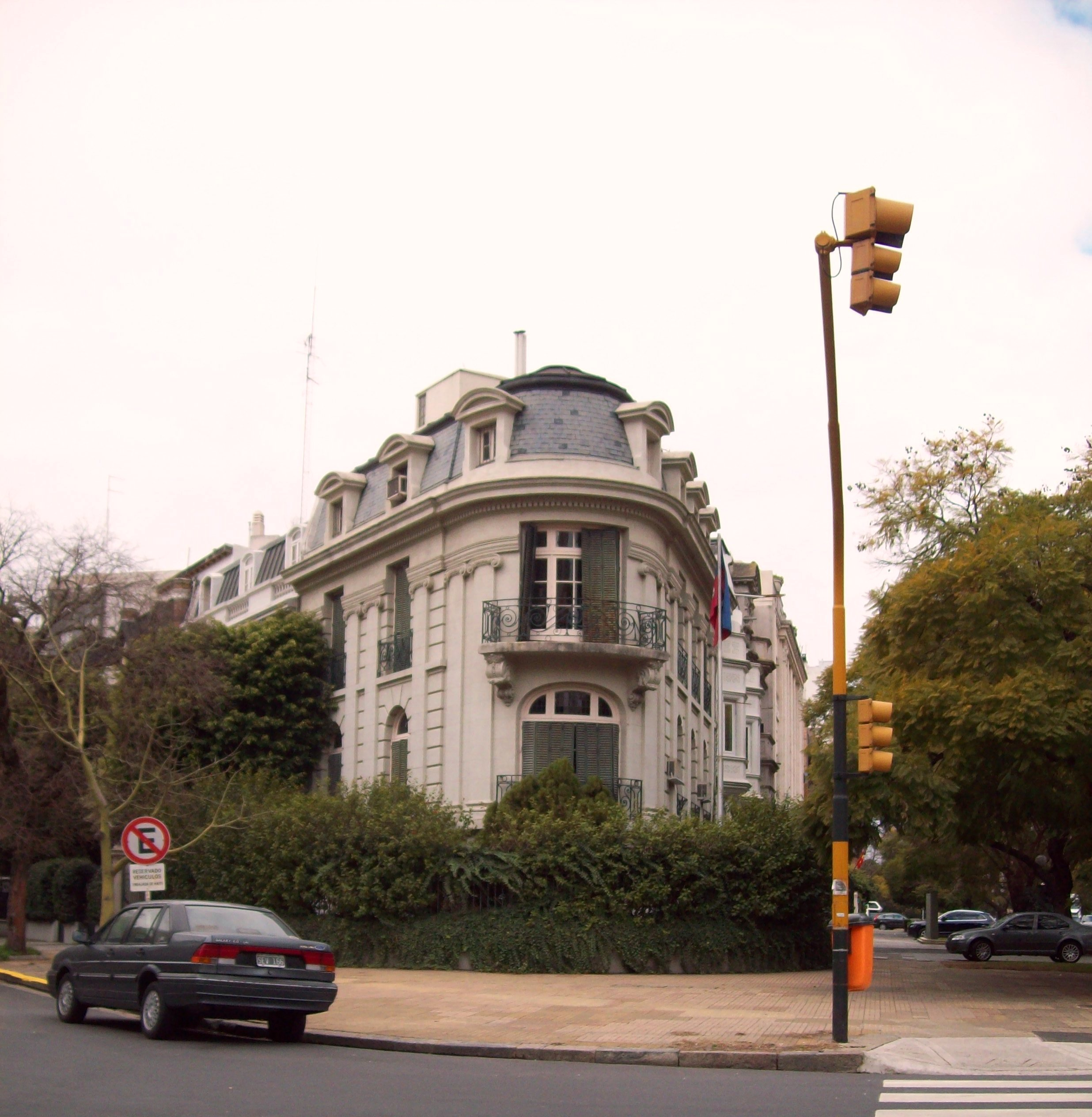
Haitian Embassy in Buenos Aires.

Argentina has an embassy in Port-au-Prince, located in Pétion-Ville. Haiti is represented in Argentina through its embassy in Buenos Aires.

== Migration ==
Haitian immigration, though small in size compared to other migratory flows in Argentina, grew during the 2010s after the 2010 Haiti earthquake. According to the 2022 Argentine census, 1,524 Haitian-born people lived in Argentina, though this likely underestimates the broader community because it excludes Argentine-born descendants and may not fully reflect migrants without regular status. Argentina has attracted Haitian migrants through relatively accessible entry routes and free public higher education, particularly in cities such as Rosario and Córdoba.

According to Le Nouvelliste, up to 50,000 Haitians live in Argentina. In August 2018, amid the crisis in Haiti, Argentina introduced a visa requirement for Haitian citizens, including tourist stays of less than three months.

Community and cultural initiatives have also developed, especially in Rosario, where the Asociación Civil Haitiana and university-linked projects have promoted Spanish-language learning, Kreyòl and Haitian cultural activities.

== See also ==
- Foreign relations of Argentina
- Foreign relations of Haiti
- Haitian diaspora
  - Haitian Argentines
- United Nations Stabilisation Mission in Haiti
- White Helmets Commission
