= Haitian Bahamian =

Haitian Bahamian Haïtien Bahaméen Ayisyen Bahamyen
Total population
- 80,000 (Haitians make up 25% of the population)

Regions with significant populations
- Nassau

Languages
- English, French, Haitian Creole

Religion
- Roman Catholicism, Haitian Vodou

Related ethnic groups
- Haitians, Haitian Americans, Haitian Brazilian, Haitian Canadian, Haitian Chilean, Haitian Cuban

Haitian Bahamians (French: Haïtien Bahaméen, Haitian Creole: Ayisyen Bahamyen) are Bahamian residents or citizens of full or partial Haitian ancestry. The Bahamas currently does not allow dual citizenship, so those who are Bahamian citizens must renounce their Haitian citizenship.

== Notable Haitian Bahamians ==
- Maureen Duvalier, singer
- Edner Cherry, boxer

== See also ==
- Bahamas–Haiti relations
