= Haitian diaspora =

Haitan emigrants and their descendants

Map of the Haitian diaspora around the world. Haiti + 1,000,000 + 100,000 + 10,000 + 1,000

The Haitian diaspora consists of Haitian people and their descendants living outside of Haiti. Countries with significant numbers of Haitians include the Dominican Republic, the United States, Cuba, Chile, Mexico, Canada, Brazil, the Bahamas, and France (including French Caribbean territories and French Guiana).

There are roughly 1.5 to 2 million people of Haitian ancestry living outside Haiti, mainly due to chronic economic issues, gang violence and political crises.

== North America ==
=== Particulars ===
Migration between people from Haiti in various forms to the United States is deeply rooted. Jean Baptiste Point du Sable, an immigrant from Saint-Domingue (present-day Haiti), founded in 1803 the first nonindigenous settlement in what is now Chicago, Illinois, the third largest city in the United States. The State of Illinois and City of Chicago declared du Sable the Founder of Chicago on October 26, 1968 - du Sable is perceived to be from Saint-Domingue. His father was a European Frenchmen who had a child with an enslaved African woman. Conflicting evidence suggests that he could have possibly migrated from Canada or elsewhere.

In January 2010, Canadian Prime Minister Stephen Harper announced that Canada will consider fast-tracking immigration to help Haitian earthquake refugees. US Homeland Security Secretary Janet Napolitano announced that the estimated 100,000 to 200,000 Haitians "not legally in the United States" as of January 12, 2010, would be granted a form of asylum called temporary protected status (TPS). Thousands of Haiti earthquake survivors, including Haitian children left orphaned in the aftermath of earthquake, could be relocated to the US. Senegal is offering parcels of land – even an entire region if they come en masse – to people affected by the earthquake in Haiti. Northwest Arkansas seems to be a prime attraction as of 2026 for Haitian people in cities like Springdale and Siloam Springs. There is a significant Haitian population in South Florida, specifically the Miami enclave of Little Haiti. New Orleans, Louisiana has historic ties to Haiti that date back to the Haitian Revolution. New York City, especially in Flatbush, Brooklyn, East Flatbush and Springfield Gardens, has a émigré community with the second largest population of Haitians of any state in the nation. There are large Haitian communities in Massachusetts; Spring Valley, New York; New Jersey; Washington, D.C.; Providence; Georgia; Connecticut; Pennsylvania and Ohio. There are also large Haitian communities in Montreal, Quebec, Canada; Paris, France; Havana, Cuba; and Kingston, Jamaica.

Anténor Firmin was a 19th-century Haitian anthropologist, perhaps the first black anthropologist and an early writer of Négritude, who influenced 20th century American anthropologist Melville J. Herskovits.

Michaëlle Jean, the former Governor General of Canada and now Secretary-General of the Organisation internationale de la Francophonie, was a refugee from Haiti who came to Canada in 1968 at age 11.

Haitian immigrants have constituted a visible segment of American and Canadian society, dating back to before the independence of Haiti from France in 1804. Haiti's proximity to the United States, and its status as a free black republic in the years before the American Civil War, have contributed to this relationship. Many influential early American settlers and black freemen, including Jean Baptiste Point du Sable and W. E. B. Du Bois, were of Haitian origin.

In modern times, large-scale emigration from Haiti is mostly because they have been steadily migrating in significant numbers to the United States since the late 1950s–early 1960s, soon after François Duvalier ("Papa Doc") became the strongman of Haiti. The political repression that characterized Duvalier's regime forced large numbers of Haitians to seek safer harbor in the United States. Sustained political oppression, economic hardship, and lack of opportunity continued to drive contingents of Haitian immigrants out of their homeland throughout the 1970s, 1980s, and 1990s.

Haitian migration peaked in 1981 in conjunction with the Mariel Boatlift from Cuba. While President Carter conducted backdoor negotiations with Fidel Castro to re-seal the Port of Mariel and stem Cuban migration, the same approach did not work with Haiti, and in response, the newly elected Ronald Reagan began the policy of extraterritorial maritime interdiction conducted by the U.S. Coast Guard. This policy continues in force today with the current Secretary of Homeland Security noting, "The Coast Guard maintains a continual presence in the Florida straits and the Caribbean Sea, particularly around Puerto Rico and our maritime approaches, patrolling with air and sea military assets. Any migrant intercepted at sea, regardless of their nationality, will not be permitted to enter the United States. Migrants who do attempt to enter the United States by sea put their lives at incredible risk."

A 2011 article in the Journal of International Migration also considers Haitians "environmental refugees", noting that "the history of colonialization, repressive regimes and longstanding political turmoil in both countries [Haiti and the Dominican Republic] are major contributors to the current problems of environmental degradation. Major environmental problems on the island are deforestation, soil erosion and insufficient supplies of potable water."

=== Present status in the United States ===
Haitian immigration persists to the present day, as evidenced in the numerous reports of major news networks, such as those of CNN or the New York Times, about the boat people disembarking on the Florida shores as recently as October 2002. The combination of push and pull factors led Haitians to cross the Caribbean Sea, by plane or by boat, legally or illegally, in order to reach the shores of America, the perceived land of opportunity, to begin new lives. An examination of the records of the Census Bureau as well as those of the Immigration and Naturalization Service (INS) allows for reasonable inferences about the size of the legal Haitian population currently residing in the United States. However, estimates provided by community leaders who offer assistance to the illegal population as well suggest that the actual number of the Haitian diaspora is higher than that recorded in government documents. In short, there is good reason to believe that the Haitian diaspora in the United States exceeds 850,000 and according to community leaders may be close to 1 million.

That the Haitian community in the U.S. is one of the fastest-growing ethnic groups is reflected in its political gains. Florida boasts two Haitian-American state lawmakers, and another recently served as secretary of health under former Gov. Jeb Bush, who actively courted the community's votes. In Chicago, Kwame Raoul, the son of Haitian émigrés, filled Sen. Barack Obama's former state Senate seat in 2004. He ended his term in 2019. Pierre-Richard Prosper, the son of Haitian doctors, served as U.S. ambassador-at-large for war crimes after he was nominated by President Bush in January 2001. He ended his term in 2005. Under heavy lobbying by the U.S. Congressional Black Caucus and some Republicans, Congress enacted the HOPE Act, and President Bush signed it. The act provides duty-free imports for some Haitian textiles. The Bush administration also spared Haiti some of the deep aid cuts that hit other Latin American nations.

The Congressional Black Caucus has urged more economic aid for Haiti and criticized the lack of U.S. support for former Haitian President Jean-Bertrand Aristide, ousted in 2004 amid a violent uprising.

==== Boston ====
Boston has attracted significant numbers of immigrants from Haiti for over 40 years. This arrival over time of Haitians in Boston corresponded to several waves of migration that have come to the United States from the Caribbean country since the 1950s. The largest of these migratory waves in the late 1950s, 1960s and 1970s flowed into the metropolitan New York area. Since the late 1970s, the largest destination has expanded to include South Florida.

Haitians have settled in sections within the Boston city limits and its surrounding area. The location and diffusion of the population has mirrored the growth of the community. Highly concentrated in the city at first, Boston's Haitians slowly expanded to neighboring municipalities and, most recently, to far-flung suburbs. There are, for example, significant numbers of the population in Brockton, Randolph and Malden. The area of greatest Haitian concentration in Boston proper is in Mattapan, followed by Dorchester, Hyde Park and Roxbury.

Blue Hill Avenue is an important Haitian thoroughfare. The street runs through Roxbury and Dorchester. Its last section, in Mattapan, is Boston's Haitian 'downtown.' There, the street is dotted with several Haitian businesses. Many Haitian churches and organizations have their headquarters along Blue Hill Avenue also.

On the north bank of the Charles River, Haitians settled in Cambridge in the 1950s and 60s. The population in this area now numbers approximately 7,500. Although Haitians did not arrive in nearby Somerville until the early 1990s, the community there today is almost as large as the one in Cambridge. Currently, however, increasing costs of living in Cambridge and Somerville are beginning to drive out people of modest means. The result has been the relocation of many of these area's Haitians to the more affordable neighboring towns of Revere, Everett and Lynn.

In the mind of most Americans, Boston is a city of politics, and politics in Boston is dominated by its Irish population, particularly the legendary Kennedy family. In today's city, however, where the traditionally powerful white population has recently become a minority, another immigrant group — Haitians — has found itself in a position to play an important role in building institutions, starting enterprises and building broad political coalitions with other groups.

The organizational basis of the community is evident from the broad array of public and private entities that serve it. Haitians in Boston are beginning to develop themselves into an emerging, local political force. A variety of entrepreneurial activities established in the Haitian population have been successful in the Boston area. Activities focusing on food services (catering and restaurants), money transfer, tax preparation, and financial management are among the most common, attracting interest and sustaining success. These enterprises cater to the needs of any recently arrived and rapidly growing population. Haitian entrepreneurs have established businesses through the Boston metro region.

Many of the area's earliest immigrants from Haiti were skilled professionals who went on to become locally prominent lawyers, doctors, and educators. In increasing numbers, Haitian immigrants are working in the region's health care system, particularly as nurses. One community leader suggests that a visit to any nursing home in the Boston area would uncover the fact that 75% of those working there are Haitian. Other common areas of employment include office positions with the high-tech companies along Route 128, as well as positions as teachers in elementary and high schools.

The Haitian community in Boston, now almost 50 years old, has adjusted to several waves of immigration, each bringing people with different socio-economic backgrounds, interests, and needs. Members of today's community include a variety of generations and individuals that have had radically different life experiences, ranging from a 70-year-old man who arrived in the late 1950s to a 10-year-old, third generation child who has never been to Haiti. Finding the common ground among such diverse members of the population is one issue in the community as is another one, dictated at least in part by geography. As Haitians spread throughout the metropolitan area, they are becoming somewhat economically segmented, with the blue-collar, lower-middle-class population in places like Mattapan or Somerville confronting quite different issues and challenges than the more white-collar, upper-middle-class families in places like Randolph on the outer fringes of the metropolitan area.

==== New York City ====
New York City has the largest concentration of Haitians in the United States as well as the oldest established Haitian communities of the country. The conservative estimate of the documented Haitian population in the New York City metropolitan area, as recorded by INS is approximately 156,000. However, community leaders and directors of community centers, who come in constant contact with the undocumented population, strongly believe that the actual number is closer to 400,000. This number includes the non-immigrant (temporary visitors, students, temporary workers and trainees) and undocumented entrants, as well as the documented residents who do not fill out the census forms for a variety of reasons. Moreover, the New York City Haitian population represents a very heterogeneous group, reflecting the various strata of Haitian society. Members of the middle class started migrating during the U.S. occupation in the 1920s and 1930s; at the time they established their enclaves in Harlem, where they mingled with African Americans and other Caribbean immigrants who were contributing to the Harlem Renaissance. Significant waves followed exponentially during the Duvalier era that started in 1957 and ended in 1986 with the ousting of Baby Doc. These waves were more heterogeneous than previous ones, as no single class of Haitians was immune from the Duvaliers' dictatorship. To date, cohorts of Haitians continue to come to New York, many being sent for by relatives already established in the city. Haitians reside in all the boroughs.

The largest communities are found in Brooklyn where the documented population is placed at approximately 88,763, and in Queens where the number of Haitians is believed to be around 40,000. Members of the community who are of working-class background tend to establish their residence in Brooklyn, primarily in the neighborhoods of Prospect Heights, Bensonhurst, Flatbush, Kensington, Crown Heights, East Flatbush, Lefferts Gardens, Bushwick, Canarsie and Flatlands; many are apartment dwellers many homes in the area are duplexes and triplexes. Upper middle-class Haitians who choose to stay in Brooklyn own brownstone homes in Park Slope and single family homes in Midwood.

Generally speaking, Haitians themselves consider the majority of their compatriots living in Queens to be mostly middle class. Members of this group enjoy ownership of their homes or cooperative apartments in the neighborhoods of Cambria Heights, Queens Village, Springfield Gardens and Jamaica. Less privileged Haitians settle in the working-class neighborhoods of Rosedale; generally members of the professional community live in the more affluent section of Holliswood and some move to the adjacent counties of Nassau and Suffolk which are parts of Long Island. One of the largest Haitian community of Nassau County is Elmont that is nearly 4,902,13.0% Haitians of African descent along with their entire extended families.

In Manhattan, a small concentration of working-class Haitians (7%) congregates on the Upper West Side and Harlem. Some reside along Cathedral Parkway and in Washington Heights. Very few Haitians (less than 1%) establish their niches in the Bronx.

In this discussion, it is also important to recall that Haitians have established communities in the neighboring counties of Westchester and Rockland that are included in the Greater New York Metropolitan Statistical Area as well as in the city of Bridgeport. In fact, Spring Valley in Rockland County has a relatively large segment of Haitian residents, estimated at 23% of the population. In Westchester County the city of Mt. Vernon has a small but significant Haitian community.

The size of the Haitian population in New York makes the community highly visible. In neighborhoods with a higher concentration of Haitians, the community has established institutions and businesses such as community centers, churches, music shops, grocery stores, restaurants, bakeries, bars, beauty and barber shops, travel agencies, shipping companies, and money transfer companies, among other enterprises. These are found along Flatbush, Church, and Nostrand Avenues, as well as Eastern Parkway in Brooklyn, and on Linden, Farmers, and Francis Lewis Boulevards and Jamaica and Hillside Avenues in Queens. Many of these businesses display signage in both English and Haitian Creole (and sometimes French), including establishments such as Yoyo Fritaille, Le Manoir, Le Viconte, Haiti Parcel & Cargo Inc., and Bakery Creole. Fried meats and plantains are commonly sold in these areas, and music by groups such as Sweet Micky, Kompa, Zin, T-Vice, Carimi, Tabou Combo, and Boukman Eksperyans is frequently played. Haitian Creole is commonly spoken among community members who gather in these shops and businesses to discuss politics and news related to Haiti, exchange information, and maintain cultural traditions, including culinary, literary, and artistic practices. During the summer, musicians perform Rara, a parading musical form, in Central Park and Prospect Park.

According to the 2014–2015 English Language Learner Demographic Report published by the NYC Department of Education, 3,031 English Language Learners (ELLs) in K–12 schools in New York City speak Haitian Creole, making it the sixth most common home language of ELLs citywide and the fifth most common home language of Brooklyn ELLs. Because of the large population of Haitian Creole-speaking students within NYC schools, various organizations have been established to respond to the needs of these students. For example, Flanbwayan and Gran Chimen Sant Kiltirèl, both located in Brooklyn, New York, aim to promote education and Haitian culture through advocacy, literacy projects, and cultural/artistic endeavors. Other educators have called for a culturally relevant pedagogy to better meet the needs of Haitian Creole-speaking ELLs. For instance, noting the intrinsic value of cultural background knowledge on reading comprehension, Kristen L. Oscarsson employed Haitian folktales with a group of 4th and 5th grade Haitian students in the U.S. as a method of improving their literacy rates. At the end of her 12-week study, most of her students' reading skills had increased at least one grade level, with some increasing two or two and a half grade levels.

==== New Jersey ====
New Jersey is also home to the fourth largest population of Haitians in the United States after Florida, New York and the Boston area. There are several areas of New Jersey which the communities of Haitians live. The largest is in North Jersey where the population is visible around the Essex County cities of Irvington, Orange, East Orange, Newark concentrated in the area of Vailsburg. Other areas of North Jersey where a Haitian presence is visible are in Elizabeth, Bayonne and Jersey City. There is also a growing population in the suburbs of Essex and Union County in West Orange, Maplewood, Roselle and Union. Other growing populations of the Haitian community can be seen in Central and South Jersey specifically in Asbury Park, Trenton, Willingboro and the Pleasantville/Atlantic City area.

The visibility of Haitians living in New Jersey especially in North Jersey can be seen in the different businesses such as music shops, grocery stores, restaurants, bakeries, bars, beauty and barber shops, travel agencies, tax companies, shipping companies, money transfer companies, and a hodgepodge of other businesses, which cater to the Haitian community. Those are found all along Main Street and Central Avenue in Orange and East Orange, along Springfield, Stuyvesant and Clinton Avenues in Irvington and along South Orange Avenue in Newark and East Orange. Haitian-American youth are especially visible at collegiate institutions, such as Rutgers University, Kean University and Montclair State University where a very active Haitian student organization is present on campus.

==== Philadelphia ====
Next to the areas in New York/New Jersey/Connecticut/Massachusetts, Philadelphia has also become home to a growing number of Haitians. Like many other groups, the lower cost of living in Philadelphia has attracted many immigrants who entered the US through New York. There are large numbers of Haitians in North Philadelphia, Northeast and some in other areas like Olney, East Mount Airy, Chestnut Hill and West Philadelphia. The conservative number of Haitians in Philadelphia is 12,000

==== Detroit ====
Haitians in the Detroit area are not located in any single neighborhood or part of the city. The greatest concentration of Haitian families, however, is in Northwest Detroit, within an area bounded by Telegraph Road, the Southfield Freeway, 5 Mile Road and 8 Mile Road. Located within this general area is St. Gerard's, one of two Roman Catholic churches attended by Detroit's Haitians. Sacred Heart, the other, is located closer to downtown Detroit. Also not far from downtown, on Ferry Street in Detroit's museum district near Wayne State University, is another key institution of the Haitian community, the Espoir Center for Caribbean Arts and Culture.

==== Chicago ====
Illinois' Haitian population of about 15,000 is much smaller than that of Haitian communities on the East Coast. Illinois' Haitian community is widely dispersed, with small enclaves of Haitian professionals, middle and working-class people and poor, undocumented refugees scattered in small clusters in and around Chicago. There is no 'Little Haiti' neighborhood in Chicago, like in Miami, to act as a voting block. There are two elected Haitian-American official in the Chicago area, an alderman in Evanston, a suburb that straddles the city's north side where many Haitian immigrants have settled and Illinois Attorney General Kwame Raoul. Lionel Jean-Baptiste, an attorney in private practice, was elected alderman in Evanston on April 3, 2001 becoming the first Haitian-American in the state to hold public office. Of the 8,000 residents in his ward, only about a hundred are Haitian and only about 30 of them registered voters, but that hasn't stopped Haitians throughout the region from claiming him as their own. Eighty percent of the financing for his campaign came from Haitian donors. Still, the community has had difficulty asserting itself.

==== Washington, D.C. ====
Haitians in the metropolitan Washington area are found in the city and in outlying areas in Virginia and Maryland. Although Washington's Haitians are scattered within the region, the single location with the heaviest concentration of Haitian-Americans is the suburban area of Silver Spring, Langley Park and Hyattsville, home of the future ISU president Sebi. As evidence of this fact, not only are such Haitian institutions as Yon-Yon's catering business, but also one can occasional hear spoken Creole in shops and stores in this part of Montgomery County and in nearby Prince George's County.

==== Atlanta ====
Presently, there is already a sizable Haitian community in Atlanta. And it is, indeed, growing at a rapid pace. Unlike most other Haitian-American centers, though, Atlanta does not have a central neighborhood where it is located. The community, like the city, is spread out considerably over a large area. To a certain extent this diffusion of the Haitian population has been a hindrance to the community's ability to organize itself. At this moment, however, the tide seems to be turning, as a number of issues are galvanizing the community and bringing it closer together. Changes in the migration flows of Haitians to Atlanta, awareness of national-scale Haitian-American issues and the bicentennial of Haiti's independence in 2004, were all factors contributing toward the solidification of Atlanta's spread out Haitian population.

The Haitian community is spread out over the large, greater metropolitan area of Atlanta. Because there is no single area within the metropolitan vastness where Haitians have settled, there is no specific Haitian commercial area. Haitians live, work and shop throughout the greater Atlanta area which now includes the surrounding Gwinnett, Cobb, Douglas, Dekalb and Clayton counties. Within those counties, they live, work and shop in such towns as Lawrenceville, Smyrna, Marietta, Decatur, Stone Mountain and Austell. One of the areas of Haitian businesses within this urban sprawl is on Moreland Avenue in Atlanta proper, where two Haitian-owned businesses face each other in a small shopping center. A number of Haitian businesses are located in Marietta, but not within a close range of each other. In addition, many new Haitians from the Northeast and Florida are relocating to the middle-class area of Gwinnett County in Lawrenceville. This area has established itself as the center of Haitian economic development in the Atlanta metropolitan area and has a relatively family friendly environment

==== Miami ====
The documented Haitian-American population of Miami-Dade County, based on government records, is approximately 100,000. However, when one factors in the attested underrepresentation of the Census data, as well as the number of undocumented immigrants, there is good reason to believe that community leaders and technocrats who work with the Haitian community are not wrong to place Haitian population at over 200,000. A large contingent of Haitians may be living in Miami undocumented. Haitian people seeking political asylum and/or economic opportunity have been steadily arriving in Florida shores since the early 1970s.

Haitians have established themselves in the Edison/Little River area of Miami, which eventually came to be referred to as Little Haiti. Once they are able, some end up moving out of Little Haiti to the neighboring municipality of North Miami where a relatively large segment of Haitian immigrants of lower-middle-class background relocates. On the other hand, Miami is also experiencing another wave of Haitian immigration, this time coming from the Northeast United States (New York City and Boston), the Midwest (Chicago) and Montreal, Quebec, Canada. This particular group of Haitians is composed mostly of middle-class individuals who relocate to Florida due to the weather and its proximity to Haiti. These newer residents often live in the middle-class neighborhoods such as Miami Shores, North Miami Beach, El Portal and Miami Gardens. A 2021 article in the Journal of Haitian Studies suggests that " suggests that members of the Haitian diaspora living and working in the ethnic enclave of Little Haiti utilize diasporic transnationalism in their everyday lives as a means of maintaining culture and as a method of resistance against marginalization locally and globally."

Irrespective of the presence of middle-class Haitians, Miami is considered the city that received (and continues to receive) the largest segment of lower-class Haitians, consisting of poor peasants from andeyò (countryside) and urban dwellers. Many of these Haitians found new lives in the Edison/Little River section of Miami, one of the oldest neighborhoods in the city. Soon after, this area became known as Little Haiti, and is now one of the most recognizable Haitian communities in the United States. From north to south, Little Haiti extends from 84th Street to 36th Street; from west to east, it is ten blocks wide, stretching from 6th Ave, NW to 4th Ave, NE. It is crossed by two major north-south axes: Miami Avenue and Second Avenue NE renamed Avenue Morrisseau-Leroy after the revered Haitian writer who championed the cause of (Haitian) Creole in literature, and who spent the later years of his life in Miami until his death in the late summer of 1998. The main thoroughfares that cross east/west are 36th, 54th, 62nd, and 79th Streets. Estimates of the population of Little Haiti vary from 40,000 to 55,000. Little Haiti is also considered one of the poorest areas of Miami-Dade County. The following figures were released by the Edison/Little River Neighborhood Planning Program (1994–96): The per capita income is $5,693, the median household income is $14,142, and close to half the population lives below poverty level. City government efforts are currently underway to revitalize the neighborhood, by creating long-term economic development, and improving housing and infrastructure. The City of Miami has established in Little Haiti a neighborhood service center (along with others throughout the metropolitan area), known as Neighborhood Enhancement Teams (NET) to address the social problems of the community.

Most of the Haitian businesses in Little Haiti are found along the major arterials mentioned above; like those of New York, they are unmistakably Haitian with names such as Bèl Fouchèt, Piman Bouk, Les Cousins, Libreri Mapou and Cayard Market. They include restaurants, grocery stores, dry cleaning establishments, tailor and shoe repair shops, shipping and money transfer companies, botanicas (shops that sell mostly religious/spiritual objects, including Vodou artifacts), among others. Little Haiti is the heart of the Haitian community of Miami.

Delray Beach has one of the largest proportions of Haitian residents of any city in the United States. The Haitian community has grown geographically, economically, and socially over time, coinciding with broader economic development in Delray Beach as a municipality. This growth has also produced tensions both within the Haitian community and in its interactions with other residents of the city.

=== Canada ===
In the 1950s, the Haitian population in Canada only numbered in the forties. The emigration of Haitians in more substantial numbers began with the bloody dictatorship of François Duvalier in the early 1960s. With most Haitians being able to speak French, Canada is a natural destination as French is one of Canada's two official languages alongside English. The Haitian diaspora, including all emigrants and their immediate descendants, is estimated to number close to 18,200.

Many chose Canada as their new home, specifically Quebec, for linguistic and religious reasons. In coming to Canada, professional Haitians often had to bypass a Duvalier law forbidding them to leave Haiti. They frequently were forced to flee Haiti with false documents and with no legal proof of identity. Upon arrival in Canada they would declare their status as political refugees. The trend of French-speaking Haitian immigrants to Canada was to settle in Quebec. By 1965, some 2,000 Haitians had arrived. The period covering the late 1960 through the 1970s saw a dramatic change in both the volume and background of Haitian immigrants. This was the beginning of the massive exodus in response to the Duvalier regime. From 1973 to 1976 an average of approximately 1,000 Haitians were admitted to Canada each year, with a peak of 1,750 in 1974. The settlement of Haitians in Canada by the end of the exodus was estimated to have reached 9,050, according to Citizenship and Immigration Canada.

==== Montreal ====
Immigration from Haiti to Quebec started in 1963. Haitian settlement in Montreal increased about 40 percent between the late 1960s and the early 1970s, rising from 55.1 percent in 1968 to 92.9 percent in 1973. The early Haitian immigrants, those who came between 1960 and 1970, were usually from the Haitian elite. They came from a comfortable life in terms of their social and professional status. Most were doctors, academics, teachers and pursued careers in the liberal professions. The increase in settlement within Montreal coincided with an increase in the number of high school educated immigrants; the percentage of immigrants that finished the 11th grade of high school increased alongside the growth of Haitian transplants in Montreal.

People of Haitian descent are estimated to number close to 150 000 in the Greater Montreal area. 54% are first-generation immigrants.

==== Ottawa ====
There are an estimated +1,200 persons of Haitian descent in the National Capital Region (including Ottawa and Gatineau).

== Latin America and the Caribbean ==
Geographically, Haiti is in the Latin America & Caribbean region, and many slightly better-off Latin American countries have large Haitian populations. Historically, its neighbors, the Dominican Republic and Cuba, have had the bulk of the Haitian populations in the region outside of Haiti itself. Part of the reason for the ongoing Dominican-Haitian tension in the present day is because of strong illegal immigration in recent decades. Rapidly emerging Haitian populations have been popping up in Brazil, Mexico, Peru, Venezuela, Ecuador, Chile, Colombia, Panama, Costa Rica, Argentina, Puerto Rico, United States Virgin Islands, Sint Marteen, Barbados, Guyana, Curaçao, Aruba, Dominica, the Bahamas, and Suriname among other places in the region. The Caribbean territories belonging to France or the United Kingdom have sizeable Haitian populations. In 2021, tens of thousands of Haitians previously residing in South America traveled north by caravan from Colombia, through Darién Gap into Panama, then northward through Central America and Mexico to the U.S. border.

=== Cuba ===
Haitian Creole and culture first entered Cuba with the arrival of Haitian immigrants at the start of the 19th century. Haiti was a French colony, and the final years of the 1791–1804 Haitian Revolution brought a wave of French settlers and their Haitian slaves to Cuba. They came mainly to the east, and especially Guantanamo, where the French later introduced sugar cultivation, constructed sugar refineries and developed coffee plantations. By 1804, some 30,000 French were living in Baracoa and Maisí, the furthest eastern municipalities of the province. Later, Haitians continued to come to Cuba to work as braceros (hand workers, from the Spanish word brazo, meaning "arm") in the fields cutting cane. Their living and working conditions were not much better than slavery. Although they planned to return to Haiti, most stayed on in Cuba. For years, many Haitians and their descendants in Cuba did not identify themselves as such or speak Creole. In the eastern part of the island, many Haitians suffered discrimination. But according to the Castro regime, since 1959, when he took over, this discrimination has stopped.

Haitian Creole is the second most spoken language in Cuba, where over 300,000 Haitian immigrants speak it. It is recognized as a language in Cuba and a considerable number of Cubans speak it fluently. Most of these speakers have never been to Haiti and do not possess Haitian ancestry, but merely learned it in their communities. In addition to the eastern provinces, there are also communities in Ciego de Ávila and Camagüey provinces where the population still maintains Creole, their mother tongue. Classes in Creole are offered in Guantanamo, Matanzas and the City of Havana. In addition, there is a Haitian Creole radio station operating in Havana.

=== Brazil ===
Significant Haitian immigration to Brazil began in 2010. The arrival of the Haitians via Tabatinga, in the Amazon, began to be noticed in February, soon after the earthquake that violently shook Haiti and in particular the capital, Port-au-Prince. The catastrophe killed more than 150,000 people and left some 300,000 internally displaced.

The presence of Haitians in Brazil was quantitatively inexpressive until then. According to IBGE data, in 1940, 16 Haitians lived in Brazil; counts for several other time periods included 36 people.

With the presence in Haiti of the United Nations Mission for the Stabilization of Haiti - MINUSTAH, led by Brazil since 2004, Haitians have come to see Brazil as a point of reference. After the earthquake of 2010, which triggered a great wave of emigration from Haiti, Brazil became one of the preferential destinations of migrants, given the difficulty of entry into countries of traditional emigration (United States, Canada, Dominican Republic, France, etc.). Currently, around 50 to 100 Haitians enter the country undocumented by the state of Acre.

In 2015 and 2016, due to the political-economic crisis faced by Brazil, many Haitians returned to Haiti or went to other countries, such as Chile, Peru and the United States.

According to the government of Acre, since December 2010, about 130,000 Haitians have crossed the Peruvian border with the state. According to the delegate Carlos Frederico Portella Santos Ribeiro, of the Federal Police (PF), between January and September 2011, there were 6,000 and, in 2012, 2,318 Haitians who entered without documents in Brazil.

Haitians arrive in Brasiléia, Acre, by bus and are asked to look for the PF police station requesting refuge, filling out a questionnaire in their own language and being interviewed by police officers. The PF issues a preliminary protocol that makes them "asylum seekers", obtaining the same rights as Brazilian citizens, such as access to health and education. They can also get a work permit, passport and CPF, and are officially registered in the country.

After registration in the PF, the documentation goes to the National Committee for Refugees (Conare) and the National Immigration Council (Cnig), which open a process to evaluate the granting of permanent residence on a humanitarian basis, valid for up to 5 years. Haitians are not considered refugees in Brazil. Under Brazilian law, the refuge can only be granted to anyone who proves to be suffering persecution in their country for ethnic, religious or political reasons. However, due to the humanitarian crisis provoked by the catastrophe of 2010, the Brazilian government opened an exception, granting them a distinct visa.

In April 2013, the government of Acre decreed a social emergency in the municipalities of Epitaciolândia and Brasileia as a consequence of the arrival of undocumented immigrants in these places, mostly Haitians. For months, an emergency shelter for immigrants worked in Brasileia. In April 2014, due to the flooding of the Madeira River, this already overcrowded shelter had to be closed, leaving not only Haitians but also migrants from other countries, such as Senegal, Nigeria, the Dominican Republic and Bangladesh.

The undocumented situation of immigrants is largely a consequence of bureaucratic demands imposed by the Ministry of Foreign Affairs for the entry of foreigners into the country. Besides Haitians, migrants from other countries began to use the border between Assis Brasil and the Peruvian city of Iñapari as the gateway to Brazil.

As a result of the closure of the Brasileia shelter, the Acre government moved the immigrants to Rio Branco for a new makeshift shelter.

Since April 8 and 9, 2014, the massive arrival of Haitians to the city of São Paulo without warning, on buses chartered by the government of Acre, has attracted the attention of the press, civil society and various humanitarian organizations. Upon arriving in the city of São Paulo, many of them seek the Peace Mission, an NGO linked to the Pastoral Care of Migrants.

Founded by Scalabrinian religious, the Peace Mission operates in the parish of Our Lady of Peace, in the neighborhood of Glicério. Since 1939 in activity, the Mission receives 110 immigrants daily and from 60 to 70 nationalities per year. 650 Haitians went through the Peace Mission between April 7 and May 11, 2014. The organization serves migrants (internal and external) and refugees from around the world since its foundation in 1939.

Father Paolo Parise, coordinator of the Mission, emphasizes the need for Brazil to have a clear humanist migration law, replacing Law 6,815, dated August 19, 1980 (Alien Statute), a "legacy of time of dictatorship ". According to him, the country lacks a de facto migration policy, and the State - not civil society organizations - should be the protagonist in actions in favor of migrants.

Haitians leave their country and their families mainly in search of work. "We do not believe that there are opportunities on the island, in Brazil everything is easier and it is the only place that is receiving the Haitians with humanity, in other countries it is a hell. "says Kenny Michaud, who has been in São Paulo for five months. In general, immigrants work to maintain themselves and also need to send money to their families in Haiti.

In 2012, Haitian emigrants sent their relatives the equivalent of 22 percent of Haiti's gross domestic product (GDP), according to CIA data. Before the earthquake of 2010, which destroyed the country's infrastructure and provoked the wave of emigration, the impact of remittances on GDP did not reach 16%. According to the World Bank, the value of international remittances to Haiti reached US $1.82 billion in 2012 (before the earthquake, it was less than US $1.3 billion). The Central Bank of Brazil says it does not have information on the amount remitted by individuals or legal entities there since 2010, but Haitians working in Brazil say they send an average of R $500 a month to family members

== Europe ==
In France, there is a large Haitian community, of about 62,000 in mainland France, and over 130,000 in overseas French territories. The majority of Haitians living in mainland France reside in the Paris, usually settling in neighborhoods that already have large numbers of Haitians and several other black immigrants from the Caribbean and Africa. Haitians also make-up a large portion of the populations of French Caribbean territories like French Guiana, Guadeloupe, and Martinique. Outside of France, small Haitian communities can be seen emerging in several other European countries like Belgium and Switzerland.

== Migrant Deaths ==
In the spring of 2007 a sloop overcrowded with at least 160 passengers left 82 dead. Some of the deceased were eaten by sharks say the survivors. In May 2009, similarly, nine Haitian migrants were killed when a boat loaded with approximately 30 passengers capsized. 124 Haitian migrants were repatriated to Haiti after attempting to reach the United States. The U.S. coast guard reported that a 60 meters (200 ft) boat was intercepted at the end of July 2009. Approximately 200 Haitian migrants were on board a ship which capsized on Tuesday July 28, 2009 killing at least 11. The U.S. Coast Guard rescued 113 survivors in the shallow waters off the Turks and Caicos Islands coastline. Reports say that migrants may pay up to $500 to brokers for an opportunity to travel in these boats. The vessel had launched about three days ago. The ship hit a reef as they steered away from a police vessel in an attempt to hide. The injured are being cared for in a Caribbean Islands hospital. Lt-Cdr Matthew Moorlag of the US Coast Guard reported that approximately over 100 of the victims are illegal immigrants.

In response to an uptick in Haitian migration in 2021, Secretary of Homeland Security, Alejandro Mayorkas, held a press conference urging Haitians to not take to the sea noting, "The transit is dangerous and unforgiving. We have seen 20 lives lost in recent weeks, as a result of these dangerous voyages. In addition, the threat of serious illness when boarding vessels in subpar conditions is greater at this time, during a pandemic."

== See also ==
- Haitians
- Haitian Mexicans
- Haitian Americans
- Haitian Brazilian
- Haitian Canadians
- Madan Sara
- Marabou
- Haitian emigration
- Haitian Revolution
- Afro-Dominicans
- Afro-Caribbeans
