= Jazz Guignard =

Haitian jazz musician

Jazz Guignard was a popular Haitian jazz musician in the 1930s. He was distinguished by his completion of one of the first noncommercial recordings of Haitian music.
