= Chinese Haitians =

Haitians of Chinese ancestry

海地華僑 · Hǎidì Huáqiáo · Sino-Haïtien

Total population
- 230

Regions with significant populations
- Port-au-Prince

Languages
- French · Haitian Creole · Chinese

Religion
- Buddhism · Haitian Vodou · Roman Catholicism

Related ethnic groups
- Chinese Caribbeans · Marabou (ethnicity)

Chinese Haitians
- Traditional Chinese: 海地華僑
- Simplified Chinese: 海地华侨
Transcriptions
Standard Mandarin
- Hanyu Pinyin: Hǎidì Huáqiáo
Yue: Cantonese
- Yale Romanization: Hóideih Wàkìu

Alternative Chinese name
- Traditional Chinese: 海地華裔
- Simplified Chinese: 海地华裔
Transcriptions
Standard Mandarin
- Hanyu Pinyin: Hǎidì Huáyì
Yue: Cantonese
- Yale Romanization: Hóideih Wàyeuih

Chinese Haitians (French: Sino-Haïtien; Haitian Creole: Ayisyen Chinwa) are Haitians of Chinese ancestry who immigrated to or were born in Haiti. There are about 230 Chinese people living in Haiti as of 2010. The descendants that intermarried with other races are called Marabou.

== Overview ==
Many Chinese people living in Haiti are businessmen in governmental or other businesses while there are other Chinese nationals working in Haitian companies as well. With last names like Wu, Wah, Fung, Fong-Ging, Fungcap, were the first known Chinese families arrived in Haiti in the late 1890s, fleeing crumbling dynasties, while continuous waves came into Haiti in the 1970s and 1980s with them mostly coming from Taiwan. There is only one Chinese restaurant in Haiti, the Wujiayuan Restaurant in Pétion-Ville, an upper-class neighborhood in Port-au-Prince. The restaurant was arranged as a shelter during the 2010 Haiti earthquake by China's foreign ministry.

About 230 Chinese people were in Haiti at the time of the disaster. Most of the 230 Chinese people were safe but eight Chinese police officers on a peacekeeping mission died in a collapsed United Nations building.

== See also ==
- Afro-Asians
- Chinese Caribbeans
- Chinese Jamaicans
- China–Haiti relations
- Marabou (ethnicity)
