= Haitian Chileans =

People of Haitian heritage and diaspora living in Chile

Haitian Chileans Haitiano-Chileno Haïtien Chilien Ayisyen Chilyen
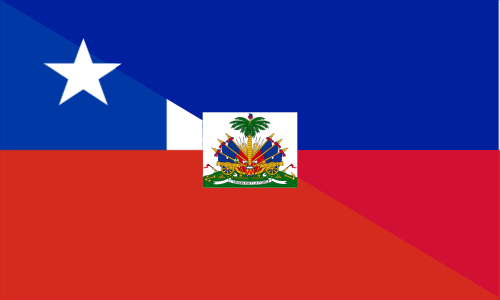

Total population
- 185,865 (2019)

Regions with significant populations
- Quilicura

Languages
- Spanish, Haitian Creole, French

Religion
- Roman Catholicism, Evangelicalism, Haitian Vodou

Related ethnic groups
- Haitians, Haitian Americans, Haitian Brazilians, Haitian Canadians, Haitian Cubans, Haitian Bahamians

Haitian Chileans (Spanish: haitiano-chilenos, Haitian Creole: Ayisyen Chilyen, French: Haïtien Chilien) are Chilean citizens of full or partial Haitian ancestry.

== Demographics ==
It's one of the migrations that has grown the most in Chile in recent years, with a 731% increase between 2013 and 2016, a period in which the arrival of 41,000 people is estimated. Prior to 2013, some 4,000 Haitian immigrants were estimated to be living in Chile. In the 2002 census, the Haitian population living in Chile was only 50 people.

The vast majority of Haitians in Chile arrived as tourists since they did not need to apply for a visa beforehand, and then overstayed without returning to Haiti. Following the election of Sebastian Piñera who ran on a platform of stemming this illegal immigration, the visa-free entry for Haitians was cancelled.

In 2017 there were 105,000 Haitians in Chile. By the end of 2019 this number had grown considerably to 185,865 according to the National Statistics Institute.

== Notable people ==
- Jean Beausejour, footballer
- Berdine Castillo, athlete

== See also ==
- Chile–Haiti relations
- Afro-Chileans
