= Haitian Cuban =

Cubans whose ancestry originated in Haiti

Haitian Cuban Haitiano-Cubano Haïtien Cubain Ayisyen Kiben
Total population
- 300,000

Regions with significant populations
- Camagüey, Ciego de Ávila, Guantanamo, Havana, Matanzas

Languages
- Spanish, French, Haitian Creole

Religion
- Roman Catholicism, Haitian Vodou

Related ethnic groups
- Haitians, Haitian Americans, Haitian Brazilian, Haitian Canadians, Haitian Chilean

Haitian Cubans (Spanish: Haitiano-Cubano; French: Haïtien Cubain; Haitian Creole: Ayisyen Kiben) are Cuban citizens of full or partial Haitian ancestry.

== Origins ==
Haitian culture and French and Haitian Creole languages, first entered Cuba with the arrival of Haitian immigrants at the start of the 19th century. Haiti was a French colony, and the final years of the 1791-1804 Haitian Revolution brought a wave of French settlers fleeing with their Haitian slaves to Cuba. They came mainly to the east, and especially Guantanamo, where the French later introduced sugar cultivation, constructed sugar refineries and developed coffee plantations.

By 1804, some 30,000 French were living in Baracoa and Maisí, the furthest eastern municipalities of the province.

== Haitian immigrant workers (1912–1939) ==
Due to the United States occupation of Haiti, many Haitians left to find work as laborers in neighboring countries like Cuba. These immigrants lived a fine line trying to maintain their Haitian culture and assimilating enough to be able to work and live in a foreign society. In 1937, over 25,000 Haitians were forcibly removed from Cuba and sent back to Haiti. This different treatment of migrant laborers is due to several factors. Cuban racists beliefs combined with economic concerns were a direct catalyst for this drastic Haitian exodus.

=== Revolution ===
Cubans feared a repeat of the Haitian Revolution, which was not quelled by the current guerrilla warfare in Haiti by the caco forces against the Americans. Similarly, black Haitians were stereotyped as being violent and rife with crime. Being the subject of stereotypes wasn't uncommon in Cuba, as black Cubans were often stereotyped the same way.

=== Religion ===
Haitian practice of vodou, was often mistaken for "witchcraft."

=== Language ===
The vast majority of Haitians spoke Haitian Creole, which created a language barrier forcing Haitians to remain in agricultural labor.

=== Housing practices ===
Haitians lived in small communities near the sugar cane plantations, very rural and removed from populous cities.

=== Education ===
Economic restraints amongst Haitians kept education informal and contained in their small communities, as such, very few of these Haitians had anything above a basic level of Creole literacy. This enabled Haitians to keep control over the cultural values their children received.

=== Haitian religion ===
Majority of Haitians are Catholic but vodou is also present behind the scenes. Vodou is decentralized and flexible. The rituals involved in vodou strengthen community ties and help the oppressed Haitians deal with their suffering.

== Recent years ==
Haitians have continued to come to Cuba to work as braceros (hand workers, from the Spanish word brazo, meaning "arm") in the fields cutting cane. Their living and working conditions were not much better than slavery. Although they planned to return to Haiti, most stayed on in Cuba. For years, many Haitians and their descendants in Cuba did not identify themselves as such or speak Creole. In the eastern part of the island, many Haitians continued to suffer discrimination.

== Notable Haitian Cubans ==
- Benito Martínez (died 2006), claimed to be the world's oldest living person
- Camila Ribeaux, member of global girl group Girlset

== See also ==
- Cuba–Haiti relations
