= Haitian Brazilians =

Haitian Brazilian Haitiano-brasileiro Haïtien Brésilien Ayisyen brezilyen
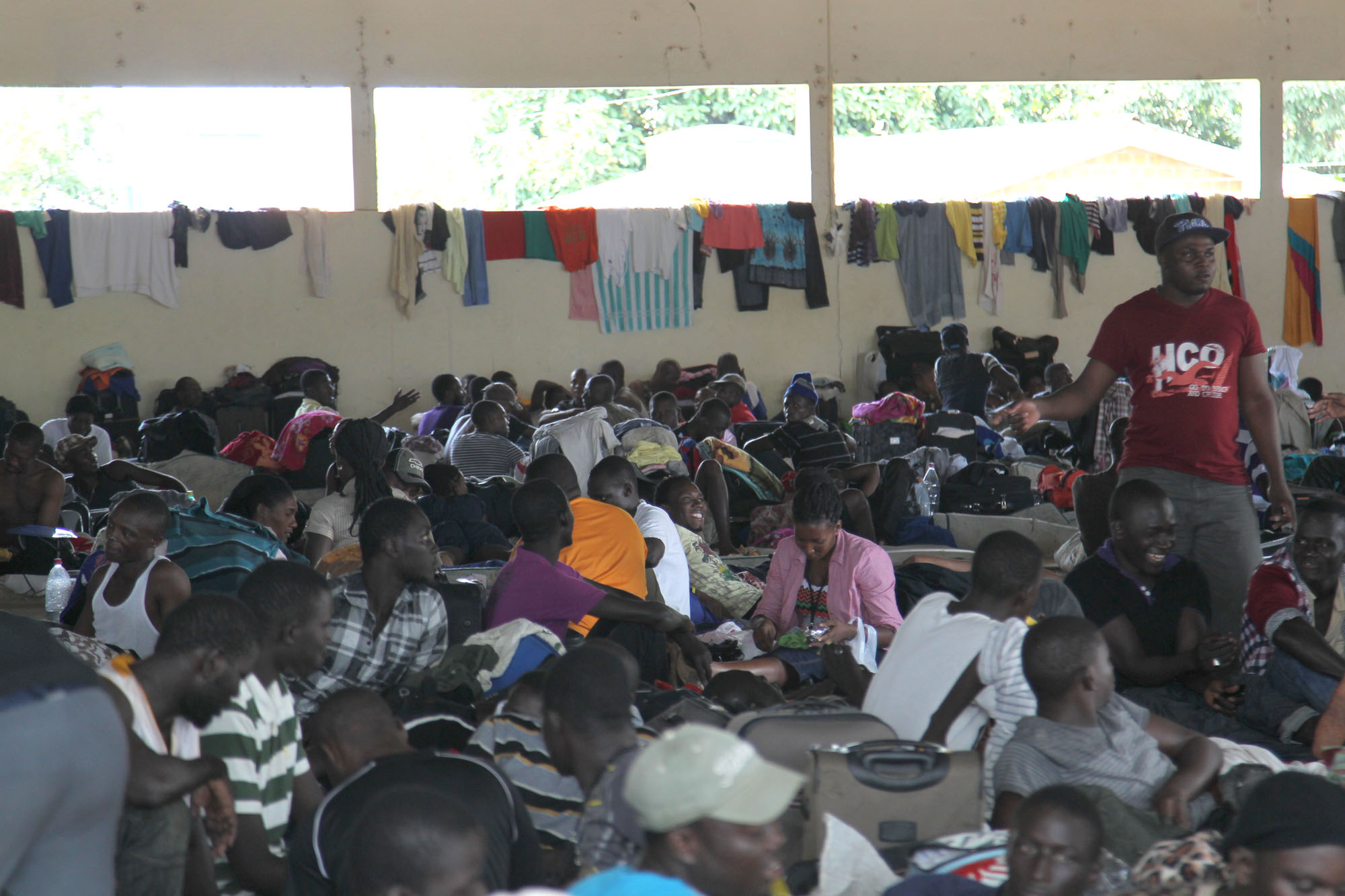
- Haitian immigrants housed in makeshift accommodation in Brasileia in Acre in 2014. Photo: Luciano Bridges / SECOM - Public Photos

Total population
- 181,404 (2024)

Regions with significant populations
- Porto Velho, Brasiléia, Manaus, São Paulo and Curitiba

Languages
- Portuguese, French, and Haitian Creole

Religion
- Roman Catholicism, Haitian Vodou, Protestantism

Related ethnic groups
- Haitians, Haitians in the Dominican Republic, Haitian Americans, Haitian Canadian, Haitian Cuban, Haitian Bahamian, Haitian Chilean, Haitians in France

Haitian Brazilians (Portuguese: Haitiano-Brasileiro, French: Haïtien Brésilien, Haitian Creole: Ayisyen-Brezilyen) are Brazilian persons of full, partial, or predominantly Haitian ancestry, or Haitian-born persons residing in Brazil.

Haitian immigration to Brazil became a migratory phenomenon that accelerated after the earthquake that rocked Haiti in 2010. The presence of Haitians in Brazil was negligible before the political instability that affected the country in 2004. Since then, the presence of military peacekeepers UN (mostly Brazilian), Haitians have come to see in Brazil a reference point, a fact that was reinforced after the disaster, which triggered the great migratory wave that started in 2010. Another important reason for the increase in the arrival of people from Haiti in Brazil were the migration opportunities created in 2014 during the FIFA World Cup in Brazil and in 2016 during the Summer Olympics held in Rio de Janeiro, Brazil – as well as the creation of a humanitarian visa for Haitians by the Brazilian authorities in 2012.

== Migration history ==
Haitians had always been migrating to Brazil, but following the 2010 earthquake, Brazil granted humanitarian visas and permanent residencies to approximately 98,000 Haitians. However, not long after settling, around 30,000 of those Haitians left Brazil partly due to Brazil's economic recession during that time.

== Illegal immigration ==
According to the government of Acre, since December 2010 as of March 2015, approximately 15,000 Haitians have entered the border of Peru and the state settled precariously in the states of Acre and Amazonas. As of 2016, there are roughly 51,124 Haitians living in Brazil.

Numbers in the Federal Police. From January to September of the year 2011 were 6000, says delegate PF Carlos Frederico Santos Ribeiro Portella. In 2012, there were 2,318 Haitians who entered illegally.

=== Legalization ===
People from Haiti who do not have Brazilian papers often enter into Brazilian territory through the northern Border (Amazon region) by bus, taxi, boat, walking, and with the support of smugglers. Inside Brazilian territory, many of them look for the Federal Police of Brazil (PF), which is in charge of initiating their processes of regularization in the country. They fill a form and the Brazilian authorities often give them a temporary "protocol" with which they can live with legal status in the country. They have access to the public healthcare system as well as education, similar rights of the Brazilian citizens. They also get a permission to work in the country.

After registration at the PF, the documentation is sent to the National Committee for Refugees (Conare) and the National Immigration Council (CNIg). These institutions are in charge of deciding if applicants receive, for example, a permanent residence under a "humanitarian visa", valid in some situations for 5 years. Officially, people from Haiti are not considered refugees by Brazilian law. Due to the increase in the arrival of many Haitians in Brazil in the last decades, the Brazilian government provides them different paths of regularization in the country than those available for migrants coming from other countries.

=== Legal and institutional deadlock ===
The governor of Acre decreed a "social emergency" for the municipalities of Epitaciolândia and Brasiléia as a result of the uncontrolled influx of immigrants (mostly Haitians) into these places. This occurred before the new bureaucratic process for new arrivals was instituted by the Ministry of Foreign Affairs. The Brazilian government argued that the opening of diplomatic dialogue with the governments of Peru and Ecuador to demand for visa requirements of immigrants would solve 90% of the problem of illegal immigration.

Besides the Haitians, people from other countries are starting to use the border between Assis Brasil and the Peruvian city of Iñapari as a gateway to Brazil. Coming from countries such as Senegal, Nigeria, the Dominican Republic, and Bangladesh, many are trying to share with the Haitians the shelter of Brasileia.

== Sending money abroad ==
Haitians living abroad sent remittances in 2012 amounted to 22% of the annual gross domestic product (GDP) in Haiti, according to the Intelligence Agency of the United States of America (CIA). Before the 2010 earthquake, which destroyed the country's infrastructure and caused a wave of immigration to Brazil, the impact of remittances in GDP did not reach 16%.

According to the World Bank, the value of international remittances to Haiti reached $1.82 billion last year. Before the quake, not less than U.S. $1.3 billion. The Central Bank of Brazil says it has no value sent by individuals or legal there since 2010, but Haitians working in Brazil said they send, on average, $500 a month for family.

== Sport ==
The growing Haitian community in Brazil motivated the foundation of the all-Haitian football team called the Pérolas Negras (French: Perles Noires) in 2009. The team participated in the prestigious Copa São Paulo de Futebol Júnior in 2016.

== Academic studies ==
Being a recent migration and unprecedented in the history of Brazil, studies on this migration are still scarce. One of the first studies that have been known is the Haitian Jenny Télémaque, who analyzed the discourse of Brazilian media regarding the Haitian migration to Brazil.

Several articles have been published dealing with general aspects of immigration, from various perspectives, including: “A migração de haitianos para o Brasil”; “Brazil, a new Eldorado for Immigrants?: The Case of Haitians and the Brazilian Immigration Policy; “Prá que engolir rejeitados do Haiti? O lugar de onde falo!".

In 2014, it was published the result of the project coordinated by Professor Duval Fernandes titled “Estudos sobre a Migração Haitiana ao Brasil e Diálogo Bilateral; result of a partnership between the Pontifical Catholic University of Minas Gerais with educational and research institutions of Haiti, Ecuador, Peru and Bolivia, as well as with the Ministry of Labour and Employment of Brazil and the International Organization for Migration. The initiative yielded material related to all migratory path of Haitians to Brazil.

In the same year, it was held at the Graduate Program in History and Cultural Studies at the Federal University of Rondônia - UNIR, the master's thesis Geraldo Cotinguiba entitled: “Imigração haitiana para o Brasil – a relação entre trabalho e processos migratórios”.

In 2015 it was defended in the Program of Social and Human Sciences of the Federal University of ABC - UFABC, the Master's thesis entitled "Reve de Brezil: A Inserção de um Grupo de Imigrantes Haitianos em Santo André, São Paulo - Brasil, the result of an ethnographic work done by researcher Adriano Araujo with the Haitian immigrant community established in the Core Gypsies in Grande ABC.

Also in 2015, the Haitian researcher and professor at the Federal University of Amapá, Joseph Handerson, defended the Anthropology Program of the National Museum / UFRJ, his thesis entitled. "Diáspora. As Dinâmicas da Mobilidade Haitiana no Brasil, no Suriname e na Guiana Francesa"; a study about the dynamics related to the Haitian diaspora in different parts of the world.

== See also ==
- Afro-Brazilian
- Afro-Haitian
- Brazil–Haiti relations
- Caribbean Brazilian
