= Haitian Canadians =

Canadians of Haitian birth or descent

Haitian Canadians Haïtien-Canadiens Ayisyen Kanadyen
Total population
- 178,990 (by ancestry, 2021 Census)

Regions with significant populations
- Mostly Quebec, with smaller populations in Ontario, Alberta, British Columbia and New Brunswick

Languages
- Canadian French, Canadian English, Haitian Creole; Franglais

Religion
- Predominantly: Roman Catholicism and Haitian Vodou; Minority: Protestantism

Related ethnic groups
- Haitians, Taíno, White Haitians, Black Canadians, Chinese Canadians, Indo-Canadians, French Canadians, Arab Canadians, Indigenous peoples in Canada, Haitian Americans

Haitian Canadians (French: Haïtiano-Canadiens) are Canadians of Haitian descent or Haitian-born residents of Canada. As of 2016, more than 86% of Haitian Canadians resided in Quebec.

== Haitian migration to Canada ==
=== Immigration ===
==== 1960–1980 ====
Immigration from Haiti to Quebec started in 1963. Haitian settlement in the Quebec municipality Montreal increased about 40% between the late 1960s and the early 1970s. Immigration data from 1968 shows that Haiti placed fifteenth in overall origin countries outputting migrants to Quebec; in addition, Haiti had 1.6% of the total immigration percentage of Quebec in 1968. In the span of five years, Haiti became the second-largest source country for Quebec immigration, accounting for 8.4% of the total number of immigrants to Quebec in 1973.

==== The impact of nationalism and political tension in Haiti on immigration ====
The migration of Haitian immigrants between 1969 and 1974 can be understood through the political institutions in place within Haiti at the time. Haiti was governed by way of a dictatorship, led by François Duvalier. Duvalier had been contested by the leftist Unified Party of Haitian Communists, who failed in resisting Duvalier's authoritarian regime. Duvalier's death and the subsequent succession of his son Jean-Claude Duvalier led to the notion of “patriotic action”, a declaration of nationalism directed towards Haitian Canadian and Haitian American immigrants, as well as a call to action in assisting their Haitian brethren. Haitian Canadians joined forces with their home country brethren in some cases to assist in the "“resolution of the Haitian crisis” and to attempt to establish greater leftist political power. The idea of “patriotic action” finalized with the potential deportation faced by around 700 Haitian Canadians from 1972 to 1973. These Haitian Québécois joined forces under a protest movement in regards to their rights as citizens; these protests were organized by the Christian community of Haitians of Montreal.

== Demographics ==
Number of Haitian nationals granted permanent residence in Canada by year
Year	Number of Haitian nationals admitted	Total number of permanent residents admitted	Proportion of permanent residents admitted
2002	2,217	229,048	1%
2003	1,945	221,349	0.9%
2004	1,657	235,823	0.7%
2005	1,719	262,242	0.7%
2006	1,650	251,640	0.7%
2007	1,614	236,753	0.7%
2008	2,509	247,246	1%
2009	2,085	252,174	0.8%
2010	4,552	280,691	1.6%
2011	6,208	248,748	2.5%

=== Haitian Canadians by Canadian province or territory (2016) ===
Province	Population	Percentage	Source
Quebec	143,165	1.8%	
Ontario	17,715	0.1%	
Alberta	2,235	0.1%	
British Columbia	1,140	0.0%	
Nova Scotia	355	0.0%	
New Brunswick	305	0.0%	
Manitoba	235	0.0%	
Saskatchewan	185	0.0%	
Prince Edward Island	35	0.0%	
Newfoundland and Labrador	25	0.0%	
Northwest Territories	10	0.0%	
Nunavut	0	0.0%	
Yukon	0	0.0%	
Canada	165,095	0.5%	

== Culture ==
Noted representations of Haitian Canadian culture have included the novels of Dany Laferrière, and the television comedy series Lakay Nou.

== See also ==
- Canada–Haiti relations
- Haitian Americans
- Haitian diaspora
- Haitians in Montreal
- Black Canadians in Montreal
- Roxham Road, unofficial border crossing used irregularly by many Haitians temporarily in the U.S. to seek asylum in Canada during 2017
