= List of diplomatic missions of Haiti =

This is a list of diplomatic missions of Haiti, excluding honorary consulates. Haiti has a small diplomatic presence worldwide; most of its missions are located in the Americas and the Caribbean.

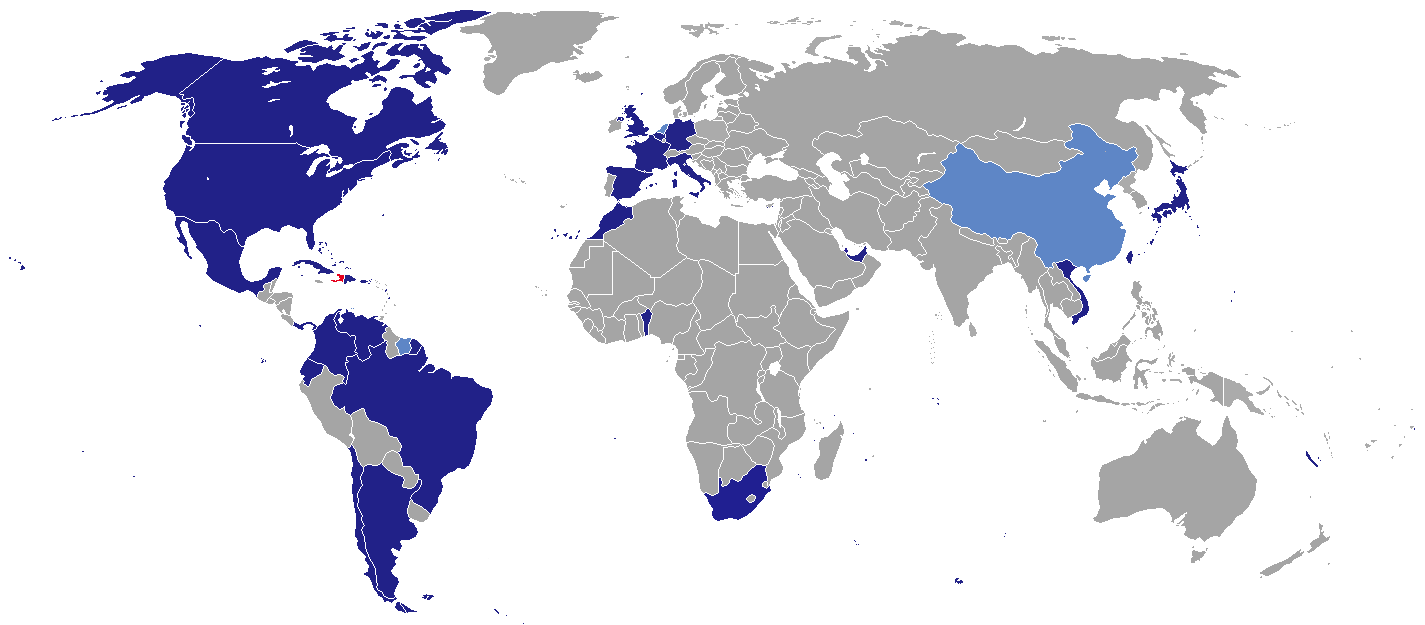
Map of Haitian diplomatic missions

== Current missions ==
=== Africa ===
Host country	Host city	Mission	Concurrent accreditation	Ref.
Benin	Cotonou	Embassy		
Morocco	Rabat	Embassy		
Morocco	Dakhla	Consulate-General		
South Africa	Pretoria	Embassy		

=== Americas ===
Host country	Host city	Mission	Concurrent accreditation	Ref.
Argentina	Buenos Aires	Embassy	Countries: Uruguay	
Bahamas	Nassau	Embassy		
Brazil	Brasília	Embassy		
Brazil	Florianópolis	Consulate-General		
Brazil	Salvador da Bahia	Consulate-General		
Brazil	São Paulo	Consulate-General		
Canada	Ottawa	Embassy		
Canada	Montreal	Consulate-General		
Chile	Santiago de Chile	Embassy	Countries: Peru	
Colombia	Bogotá	Embassy		
Cuba	Havana	Embassy	Countries: Serbia	
Dominican Republic	Santo Domingo	Embassy		
Dominican Republic	Barahona	Consulate-General		
Dominican Republic	Dajabón	Consulate-General		
Dominican Republic	Higüey	Consulate-General		
Dominican Republic	Santiago de los Caballeros	Consulate-General		
Ecuador	Quito	Embassy		
Mexico	Mexico City	Embassy	Countries: Belize; Guatemala	
Mexico	Tapachula	Consulate-General	Countries: Belize; Guatemala	
Mexico	Tijuana	Consulate-General	Countries: Belize; Guatemala	
Panama	Panama City	Embassy	Countries: Bolivia; Costa Rica; Honduras	
Suriname	Paramaribo	Consulate-General		
United States	Washington, D.C.	Embassy		
United States	Atlanta (Georgia)	Consulate-General		
United States	Boston (Massachusetts)	Consulate-General		
United States	Chicago (Illinois)	Consulate-General		
United States	Miami (Florida)	Consulate-General		
United States	New York City (New York)	Consulate-General		
United States	Orlando (Florida)	Consulate		
Venezuela	Caracas	Embassy		

=== Asia ===
Host country	Host city	Mission	Concurrent accreditation	Ref.
China	Beijing	Commercial Development Bureau		
Japan	Tokyo	Embassy		
Qatar	Doha	Embassy		
Republic of China (Taiwan)	Taipei	Embassy		
United Arab Emirates	Abu Dhabi	Embassy		
Vietnam	Hanoi	Embassy	Countries: Australia; Brunei; Indonesia; Laos; Malaysia; Myanmar; Philippines; Thailand	

=== Europe ===
Host country	Host city	Mission	Concurrent accreditation	Ref.
Belgium	Brussels	Embassy	Countries: Luxembourg; Netherlands; Multilateral Organizations: European Union; Organisation for the Prohibition of Chemical Weapons	
France	Paris	Embassy	Countries: Switzerland; Multilateral Organizations: Francophonie	
France	Paris	Consulate-General	Countries: Switzerland; Multilateral Organizations: Francophonie	
France	Cayenne, French Guiana	Consulate-General	Countries: Switzerland; Multilateral Organizations: Francophonie	
France	Pointe-à-Pitre, Guadeloupe	Consulate	Countries: Switzerland; Multilateral Organizations: Francophonie	
Germany	Berlin	Embassy	Countries: Poland	
Holy See (Note: The Haitian Embassy to the Holy See is located outside Vatican territory in Rome.)	Rome	Embassy		
Italy	Rome	Embassy		
Netherlands	Oranjestad, Aruba	Consulate-General		
Netherlands	Willemstad, Curaçao	Consulate-General		
Spain	Madrid	Embassy		
United Kingdom	London	Embassy		
United Kingdom	Providenciales (Turks and Caicos Islands)	Consulate-General		

=== Multilateral organizations ===
Organization	Host city	Host country	Mission	Concurrent accreditation	Ref.
Organization of American States	Washington, D.C.	United States	Permanent Mission		
United Nations	New York City	United States	Permanent Mission	Countries: Hungary	
United Nations	Geneva	Switzerland	Permanent Mission	Countries: Austria; Switzerland	
UNESCO	Paris	France	Permanent Delegation		
World Trade Organization	Geneva	Switzerland	Permanent Mission		

== Gallery ==
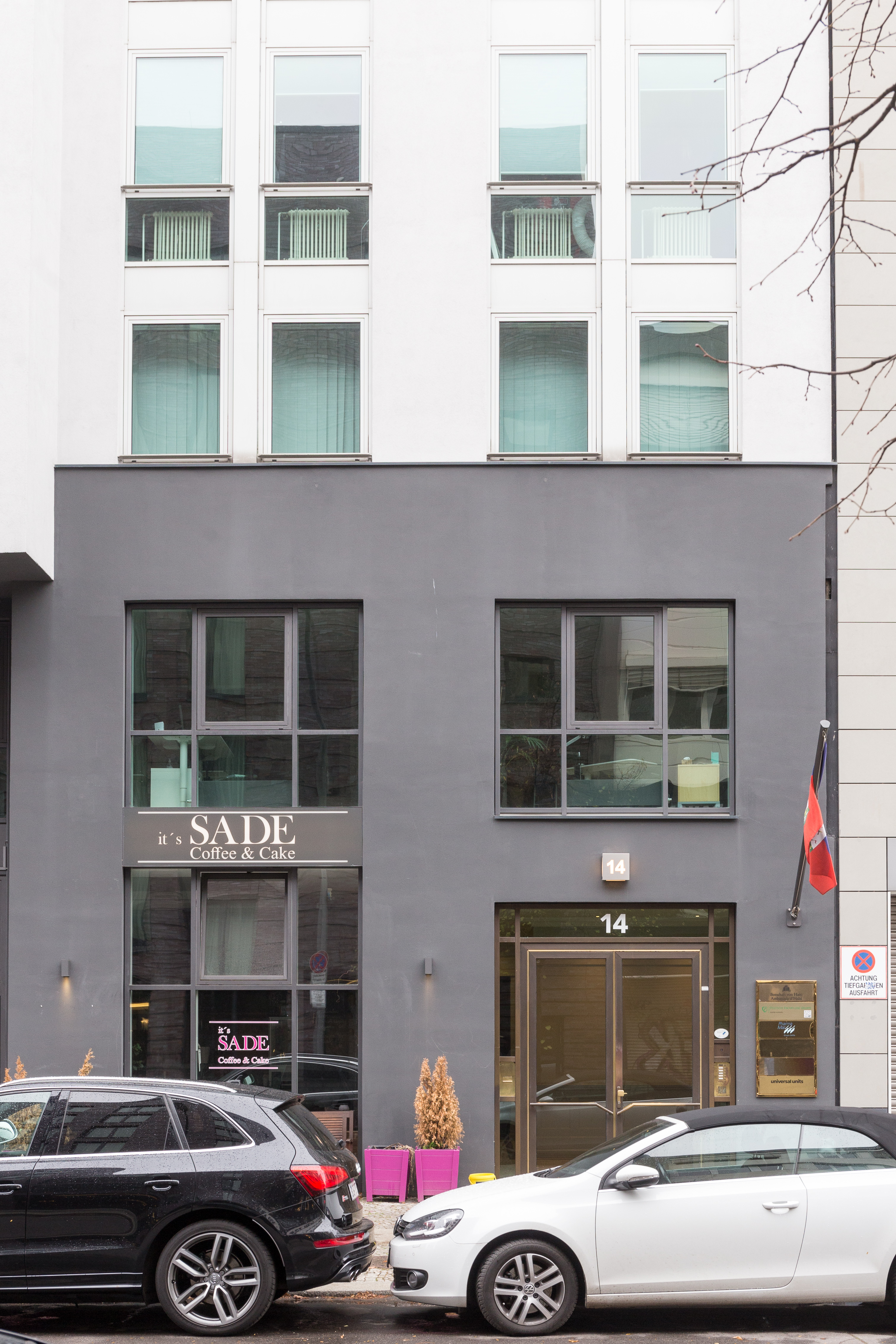
Building hosting the Embassy in Berlin

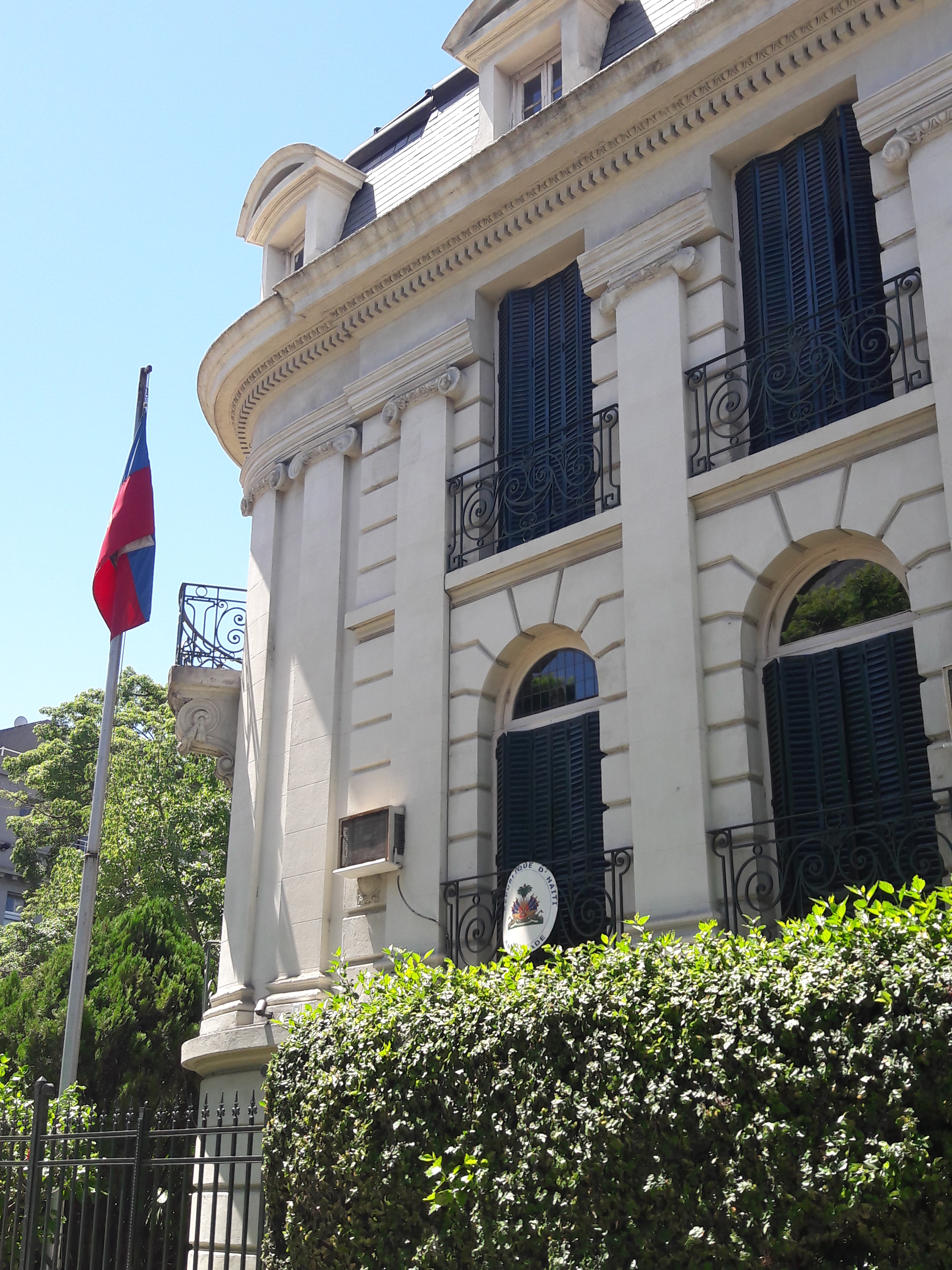
Embassy in Buenos Aires

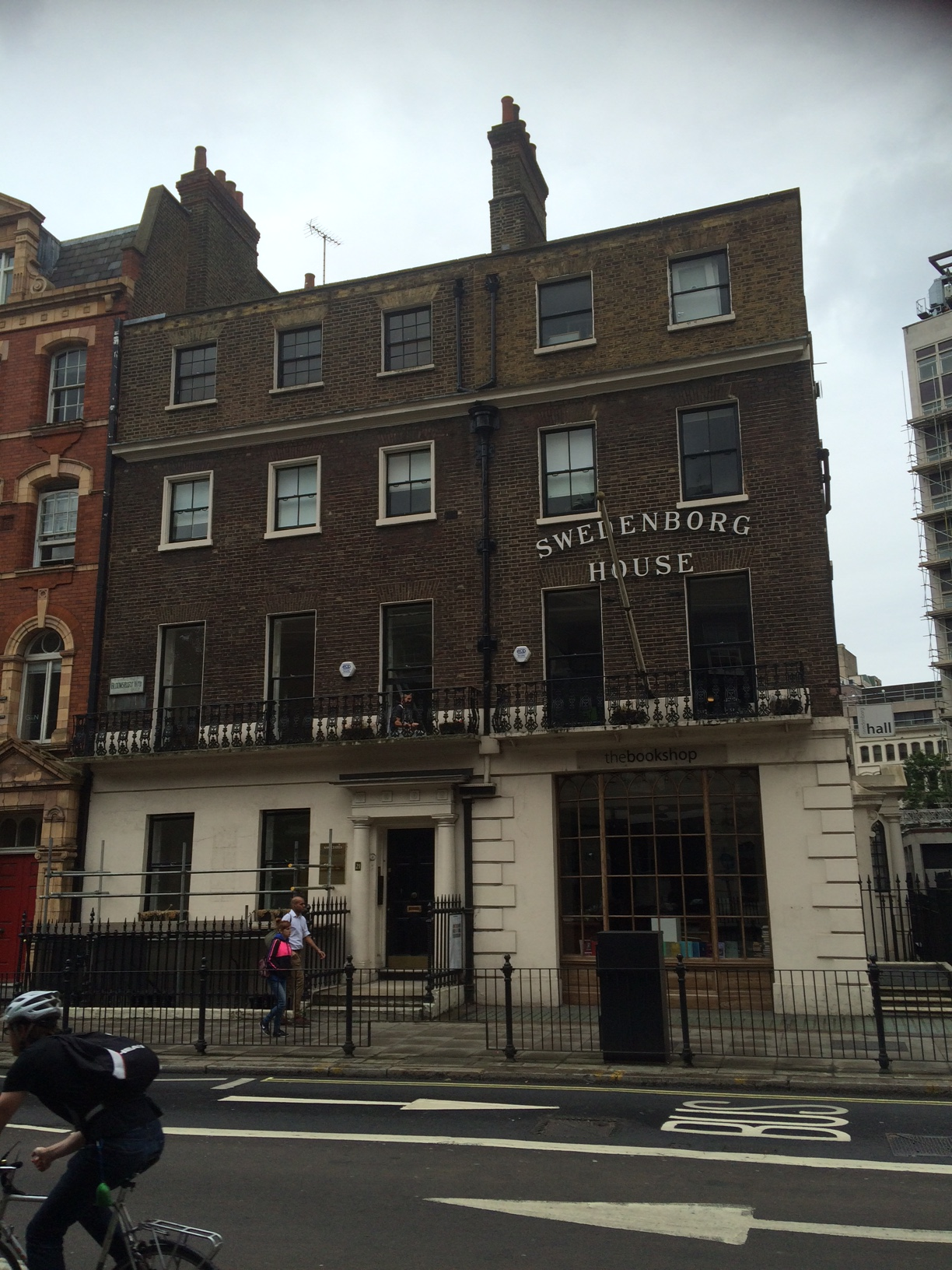
Building hosting the Embassy in London

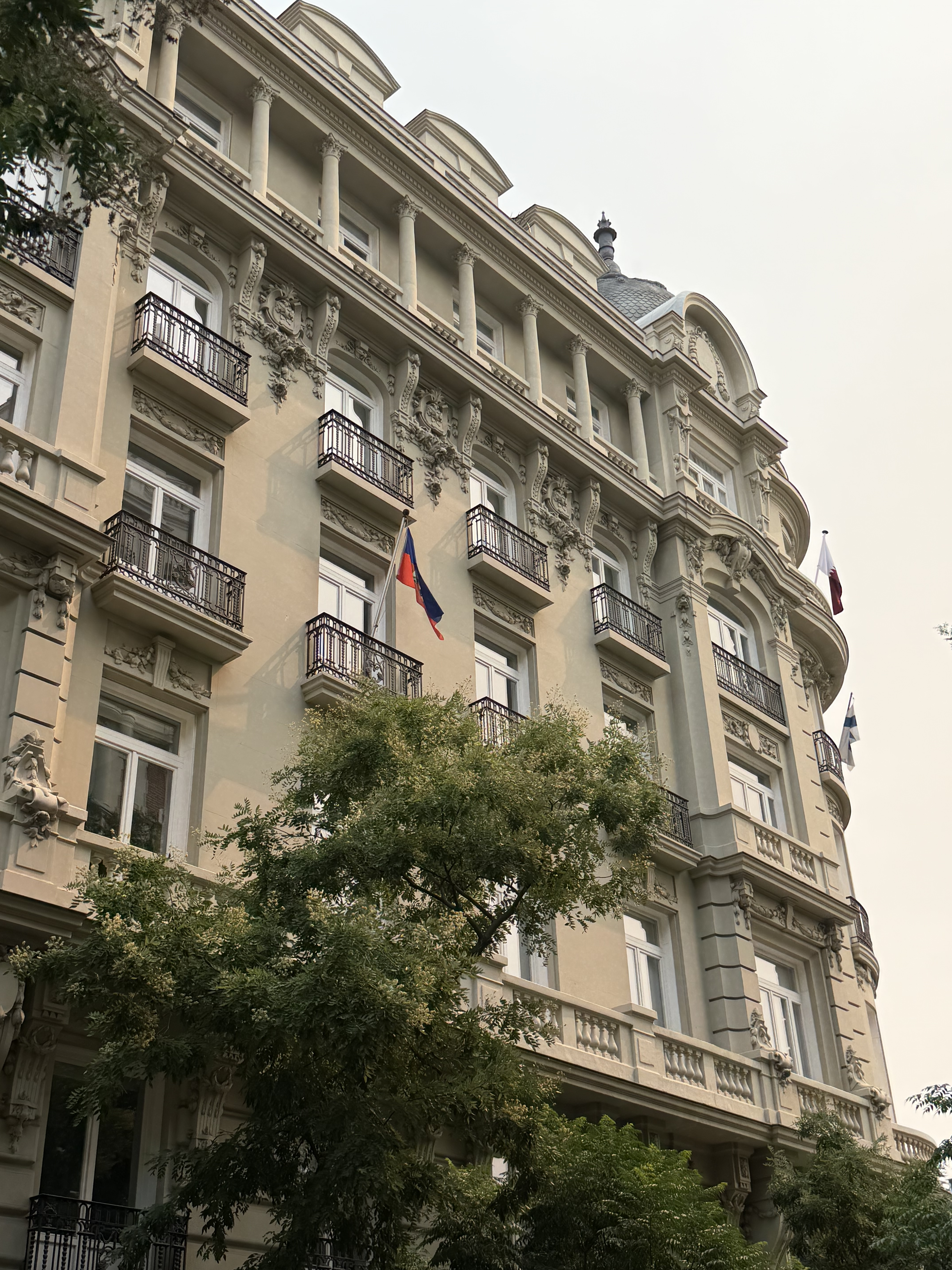
Embassy in Madrid

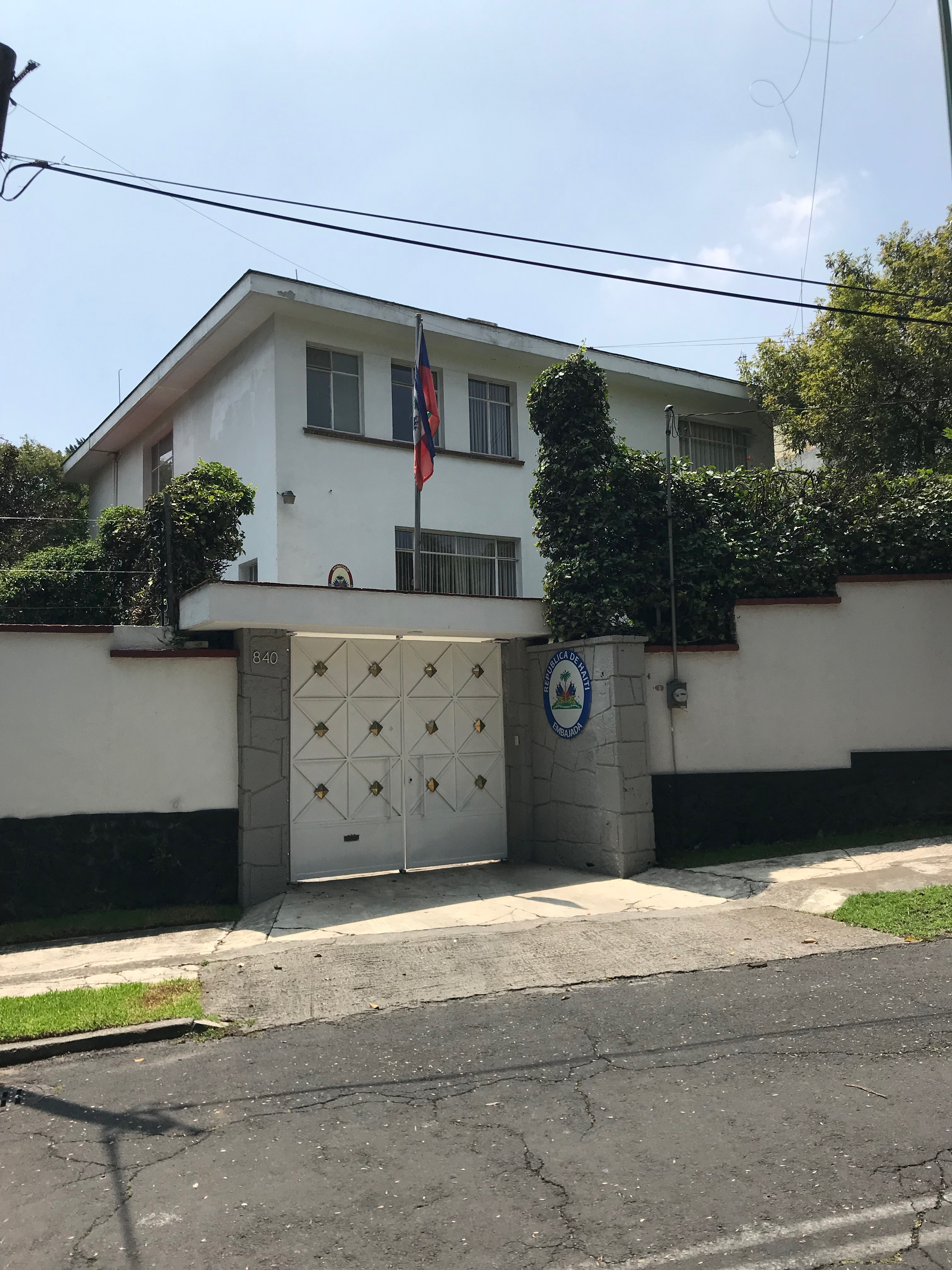
Embassy in Mexico City

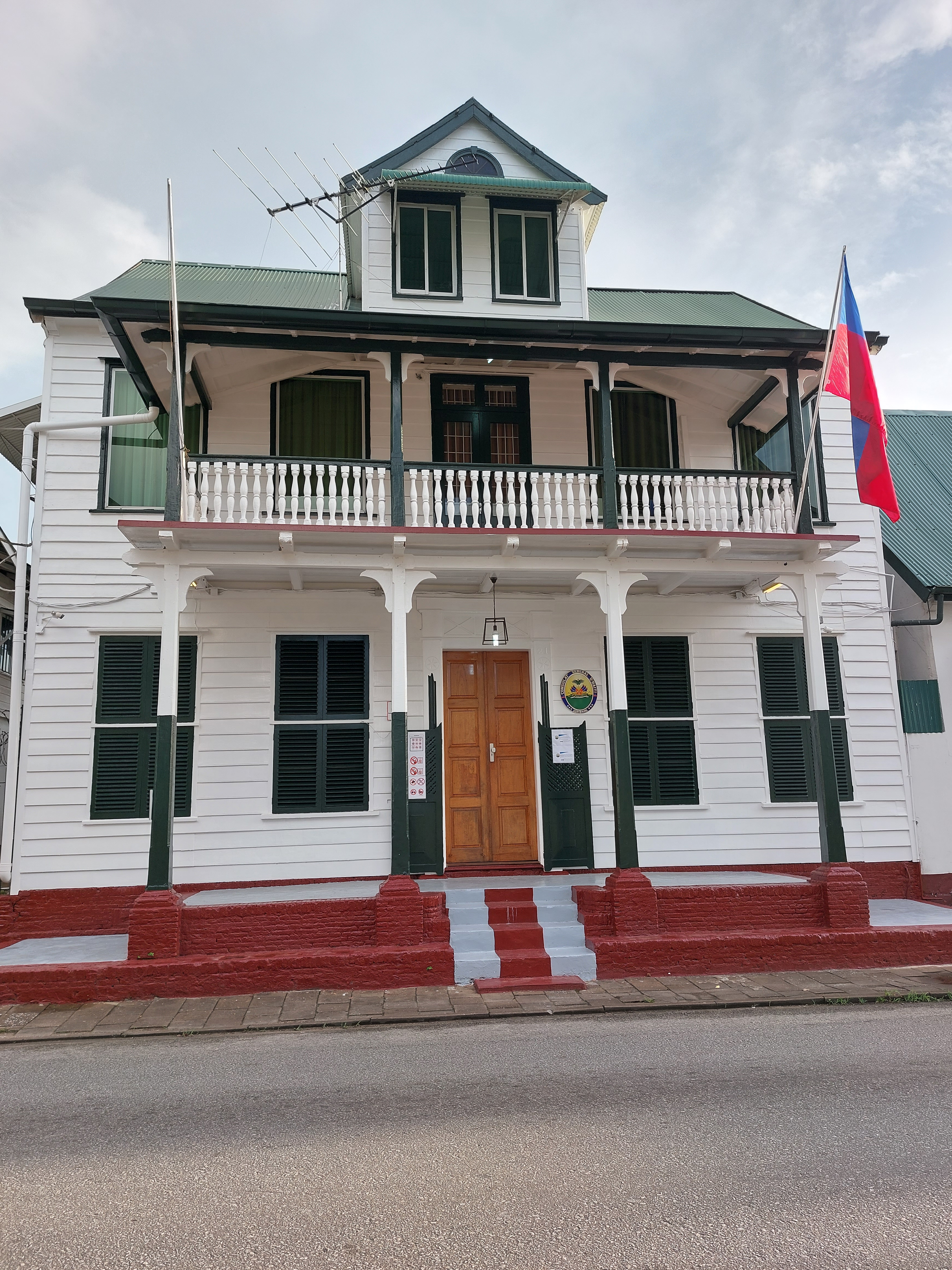
Consulate-General in Paramaribo

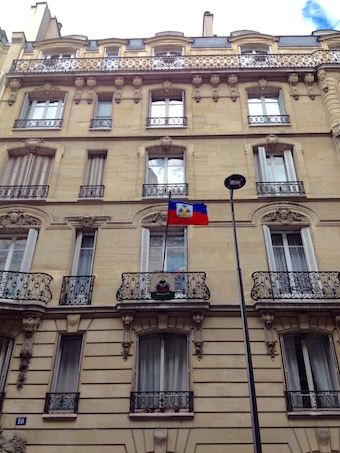
Embassy in Paris

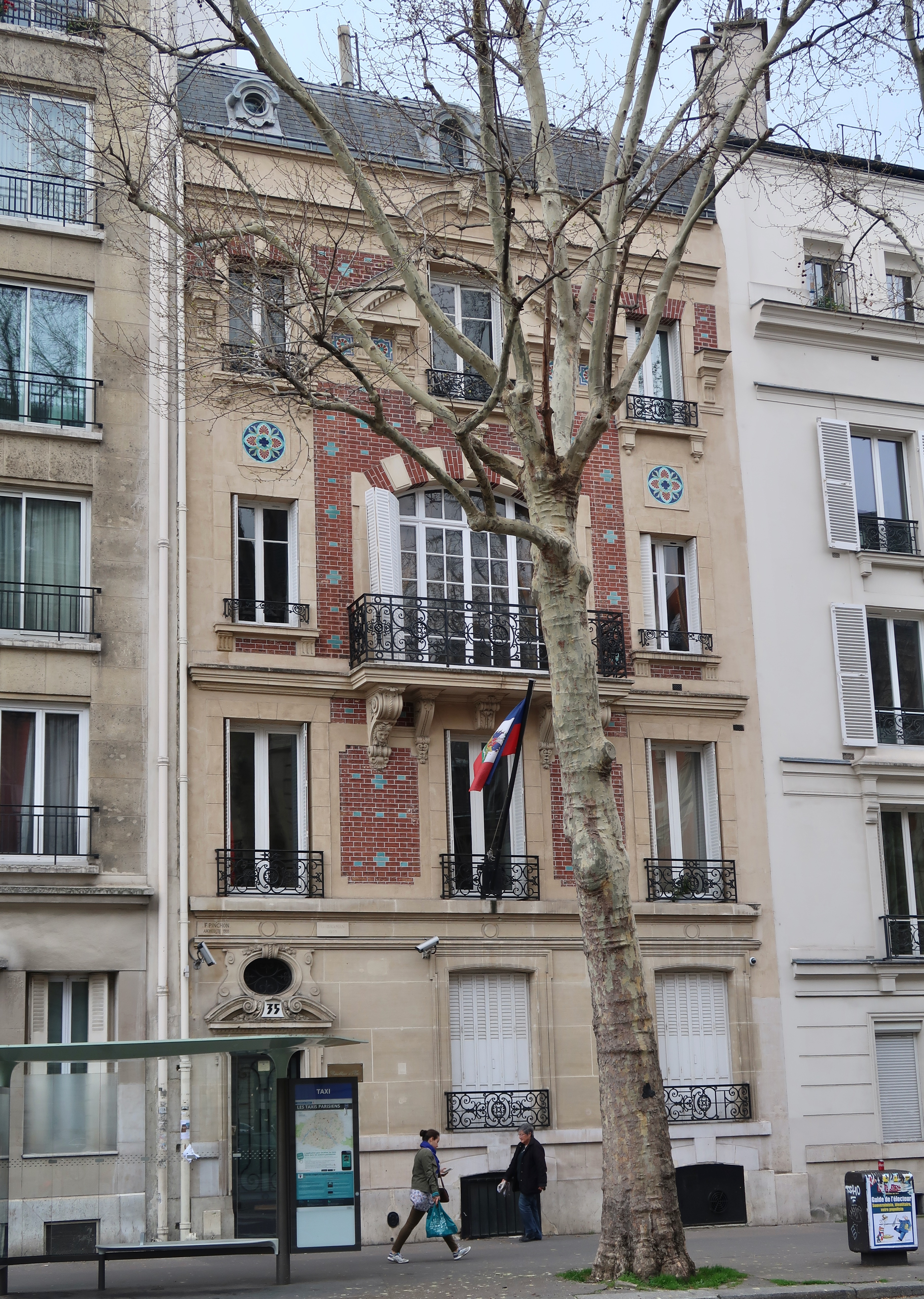
Consulate-General in Paris

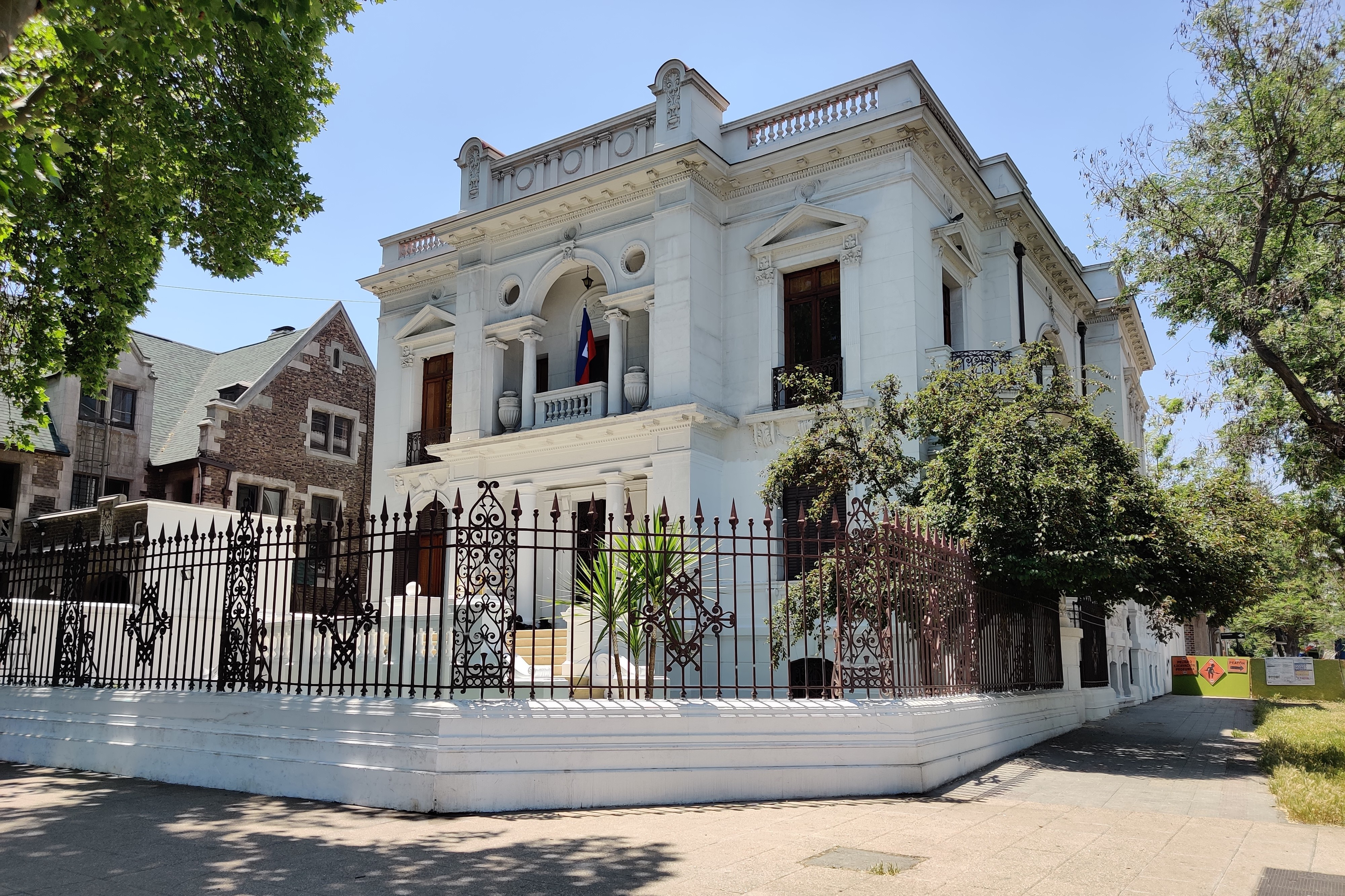
Embassy in Santiago

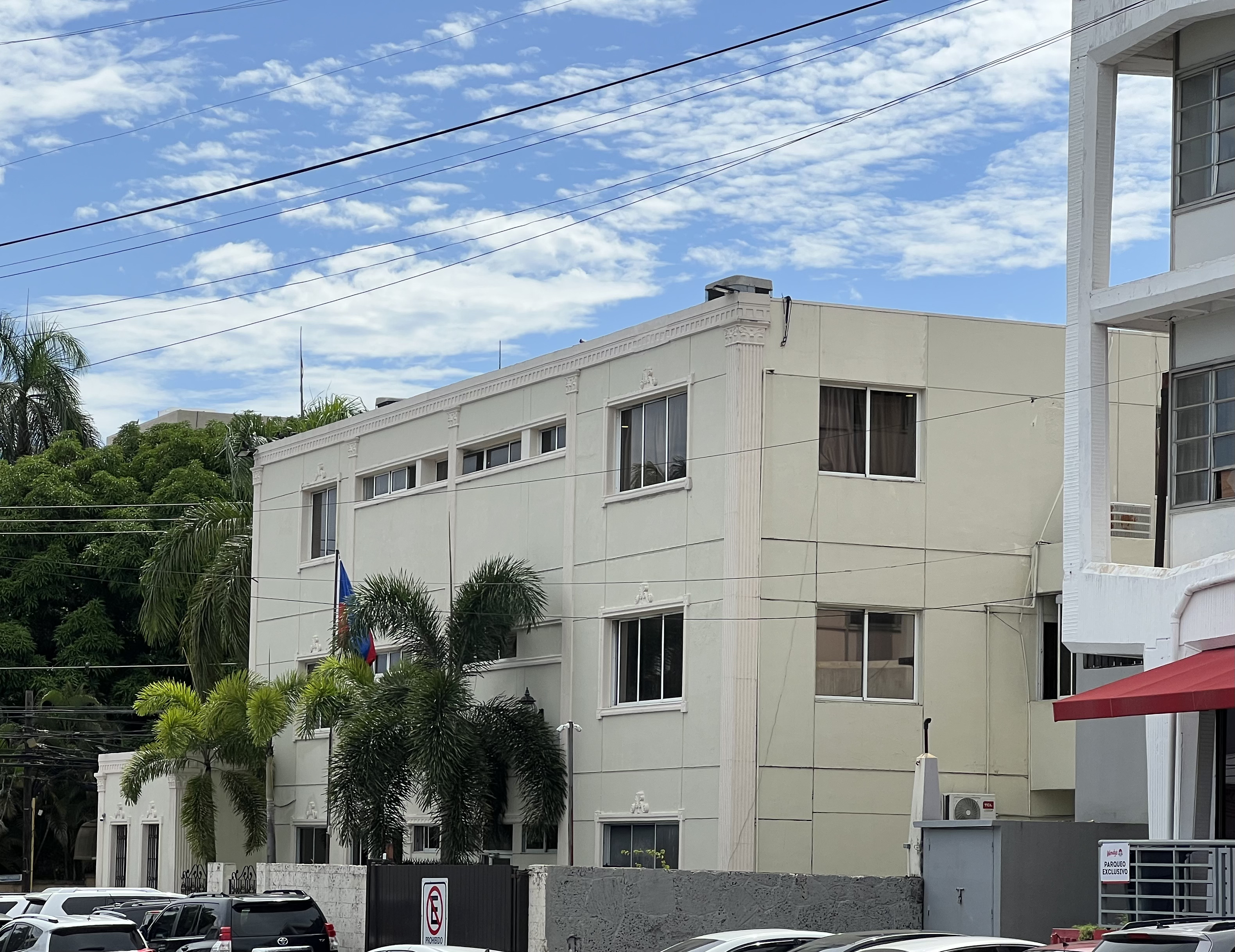
Embassy in Santo Domingo

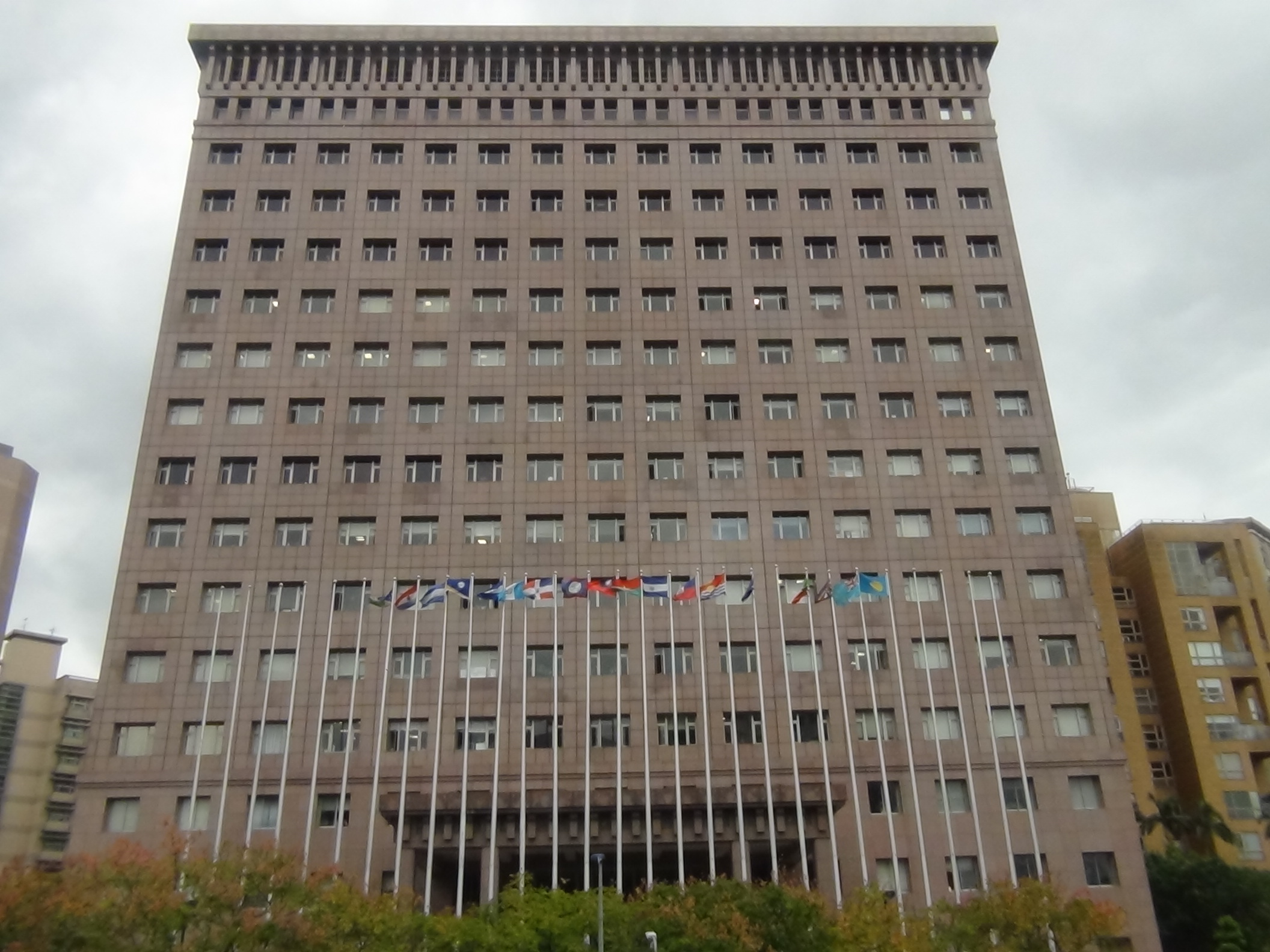
Building hosting the Embassy in Taipei

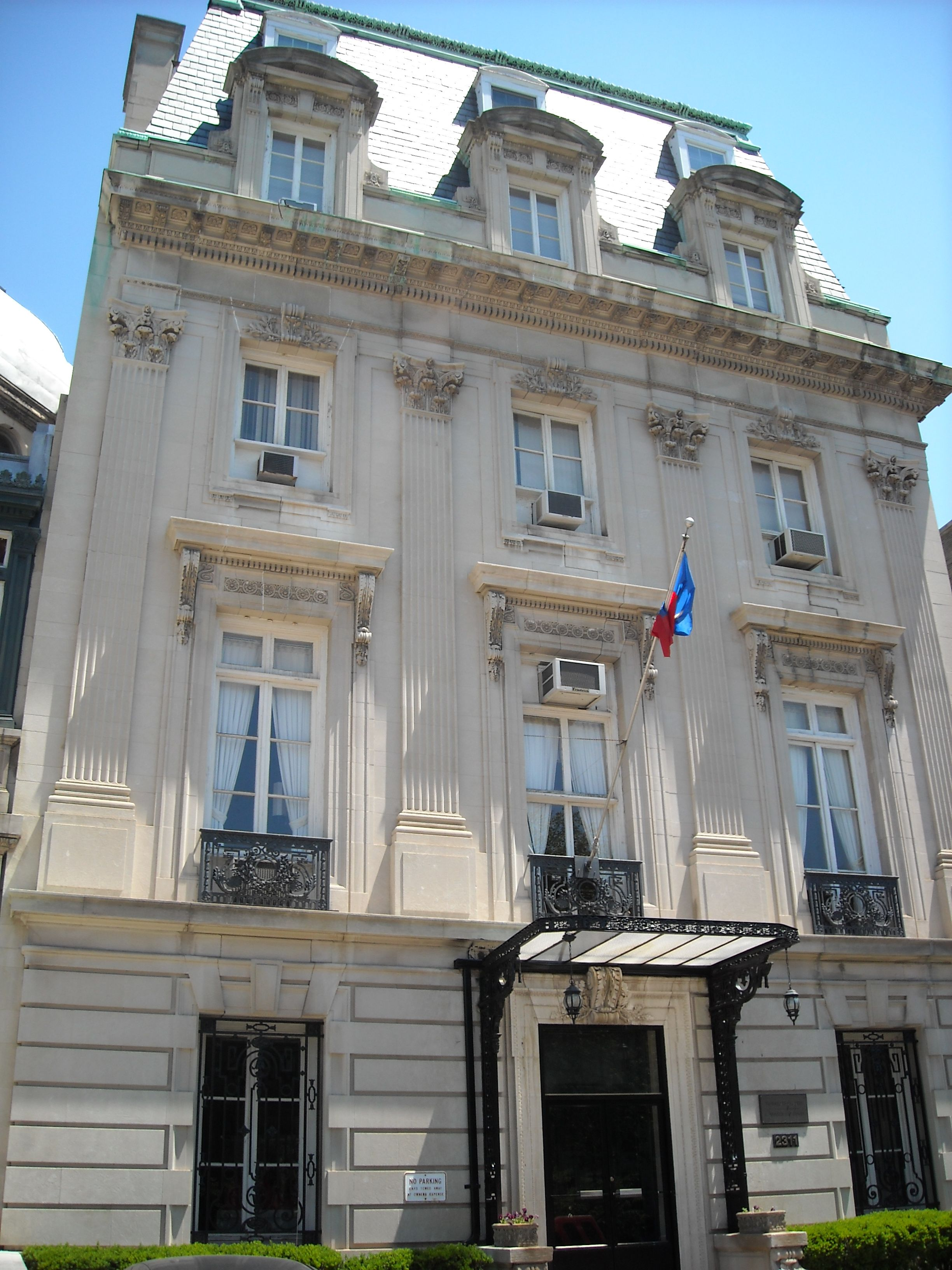
Embassy in Washington, D.C.

== See also ==
- Foreign relations of Haiti
- List of diplomatic missions in Haiti
- Visa policy of Haiti
- Visa requirements for Haitian citizens
