= Diplomatic Quarter (Taiwan) =

- 使館特區
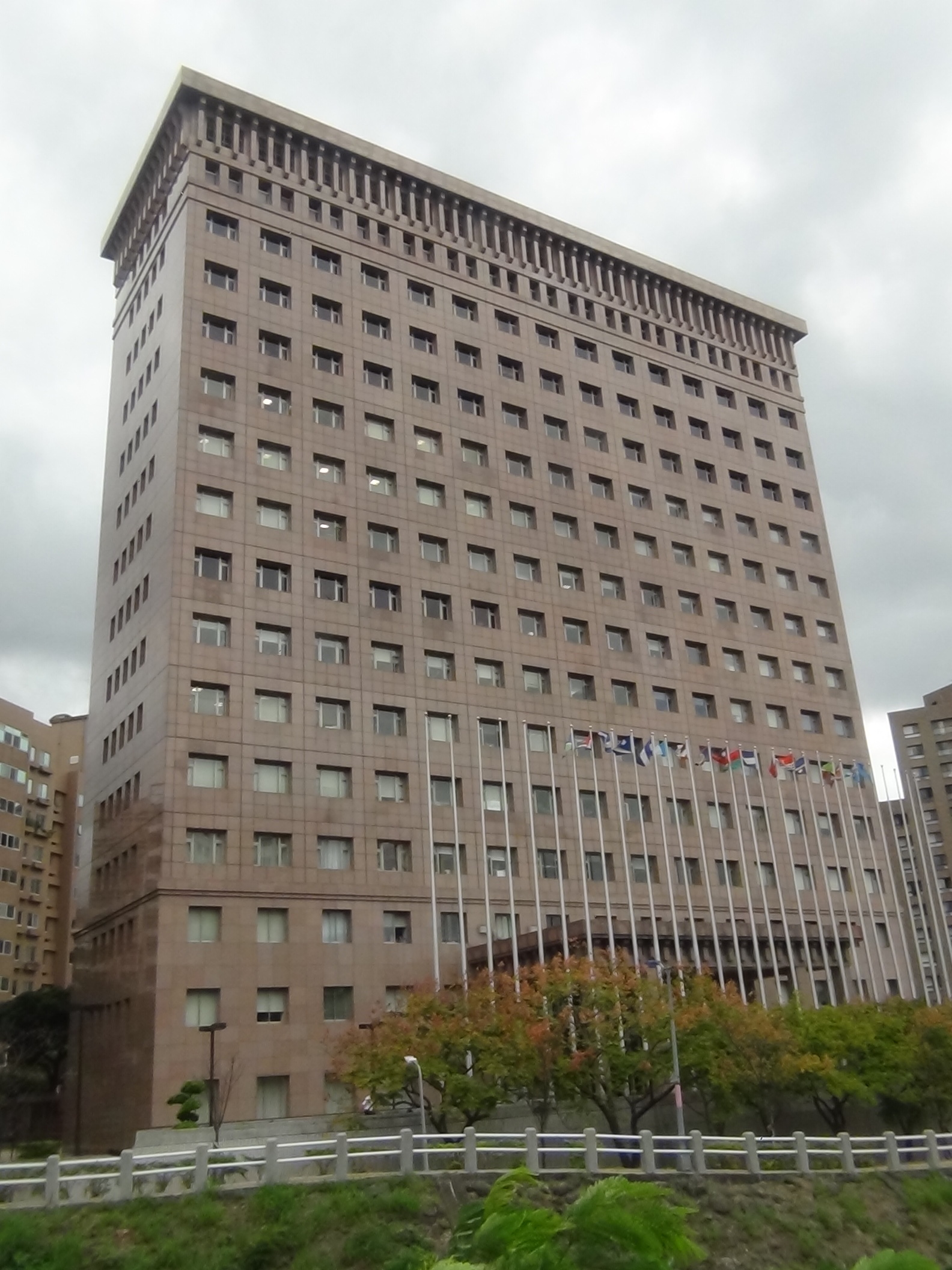
- The Diplomatic Quarter, as seen from Lane 101, Tianmu West road (天母西路101巷)
- Interactive map of the Diplomatic Quarter area

General information
- Type: Diplomatic building
- Location: Shilin, Taipei, Taiwan
- Coordinates: 25.117248°N 121.524108°E
- Construction started: 1994
- Completed: 1998

The Diplomatic Quarter (Chinese: 使館特區; pinyin: Shǐguǎn Tèqū) is a building that houses most of the foreign embassies in Taiwan, as well as the headquarters of the International Cooperation and Development Fund (TaiwanICDF). It is located in the Tianmu neighbourhood of Shilin District in the capital Taipei.

Additionally, the term may refer to the area around this building, for example in the context of the housing market.

An eight-second montage showing flags in front of the Diplomatic Quarter, as seen on 31 October 2017.

== Tenants ==
- Embassy of Belize
- Embassy of Eswatini
- Embassy of Guatemala
- Embassy of Haiti
- Embassy of Marshall Islands
- Embassy of Palau
- Embassy of Paraguay
- Embassy of Saint Kitts and Nevis
- Embassy of Saint Lucia
- Embassy of Saint Vincent and the Grenadines
- Embassy of Tuvalu
- Saudi Arabian Trade Office
- Somaliland Representative Office

== 2009 H1N1 case ==
On 15 June 2009 a female diplomat went to work inside the building after returning from a trip to the Americas. That afternoon, she felt uncomfortable and thus went home. On 16 June she was examined in the National Taiwan University Hospital and the day after it was known that the examination was positive for the Pandemic H1N1/09 virus. The story only went public after a delay, for which the Ministry of Foreign Affairs was widely criticized as trying to keep the news hidden, endangering the health of other people inside the building and the general public.

== See also ==
- List of diplomatic missions in Taiwan
