= List of diplomatic missions in Haiti =

This is a list of diplomatic missions in Haiti. There are currently 19 embassies posted in Port-au-Prince.

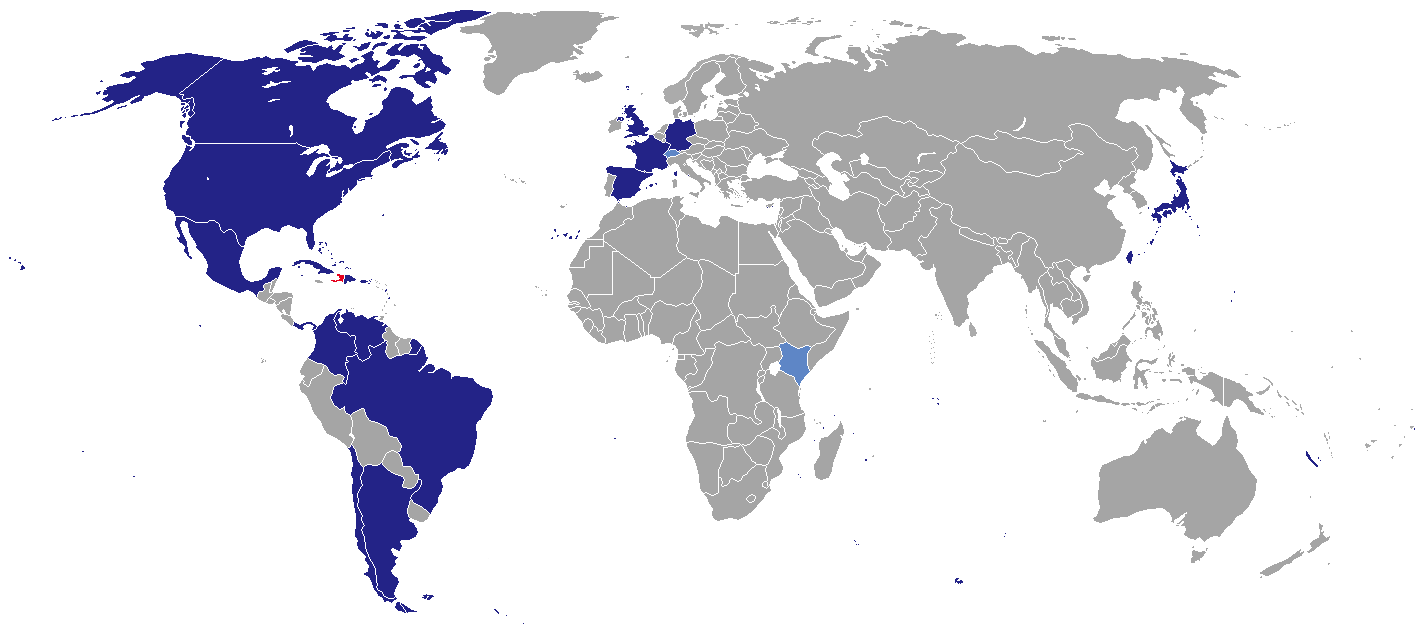
Map of diplomatic missions in Haiti

== Embassies in Port-au-Prince ==
1. Argentina
2. Bahamas
3. Brazil
4. Canada
5. Chile
6. Republic of China (Taiwan)
7. Colombia
8. Cuba
9. Dominican Republic
10. France
11. Germany
12. Holy See
13. Japan
14. Mexico
15. Panama
16. Spain
17. United Kingdom
18. United States
19. Venezuela

== Other posts in Port-au-Prince ==
- China (Trade Office)
- European Union (Delegation)
- Switzerland (Cooperation Office)

== Consulates-General/Consulates ==
Anse-à-Pitres

- Dominican Republic

Belladère

- Dominican Republic

Cap Haitien

- Dominican Republic

Ouanaminthe

- Dominican Republic

== Non-Resident Embassies ==
=== Resident in Havana, Cuba ===
- Angola
- Austria
- Belgium
- Cambodia
- Czech Republic
- Egypt
- Gabon
- Ghana
- Guinea
- Indonesia
- Kenya
- Laos
- Libya
- Malaysia
- Morocco
- Namibia
- Norway
- Paraguay
- Palestine
- Portugal
- Saudi Arabia
- Serbia
- Slovakia
- Timor-Leste
- Ukraine
- United Arab Emirates
- Vietnam
- Zimbabwe

=== Resident in Santo Domingo, Dominican Republic ===
- Guatemala
- India
- Israel
- Netherlands
- Nicaragua
- Peru
- South Korea
- Turkey

=== Resident in Ottawa, Canada ===
- Ethiopia
- Madagascar
- Nepal
- Rwanda

=== Resident in Washington, D.C., United States ===
- Bangladesh
- Bahrain
- Central African Republic
- Philippines
- Singapore
- Sudan
- Tunisia
- Zambia

=== Resident in New York City, United States ===
The following entries are the sending countries' permanent missions to the United Nations

- Afghanistan
- Bosnia and Herzegovina
- Ghana
- Ireland
- Kuwait
- Lesotho
- Micronesia
- Seychelles
- Singapore
- South Sudan
- Turkmenistan
- Togo
- Tajikistan
- Uganda
- Uzbekistan
- Vanuatu
- Yemen

=== Resident in other cities ===
- Algeria (Caracas)
- Australia (Port-of-Spain)
- Finland (Helsinki) (Note: Finland conducts diplomatic relations with Haiti via a "Roving Ambassador to the Caribbean", an ambassador based in Helsinki who periodically visits the Caribbean countries under his/her jurisdiction.)
- Greece (Caracas)
- Ivory Coast (Mexico City)
- Iceland (Reykjavík)
- Malawi (Brasília)
- New Zealand (Bridgetown)
- Poland (Panama City)
- Russia (Caracas)
- Thailand (Mexico City)

== Former Embassy ==
- Ethiopia (closed in 1967)
- Italy
- South Korea (closed in 1992)
- Switzerland

== See also ==
- Foreign relations of Haiti
- List of diplomatic missions of Haiti
- Visa policy of Haiti
