= NTU Hospital metro station =

Metro station in Taipei, Taiwan

NTU Hospital 台大醫院
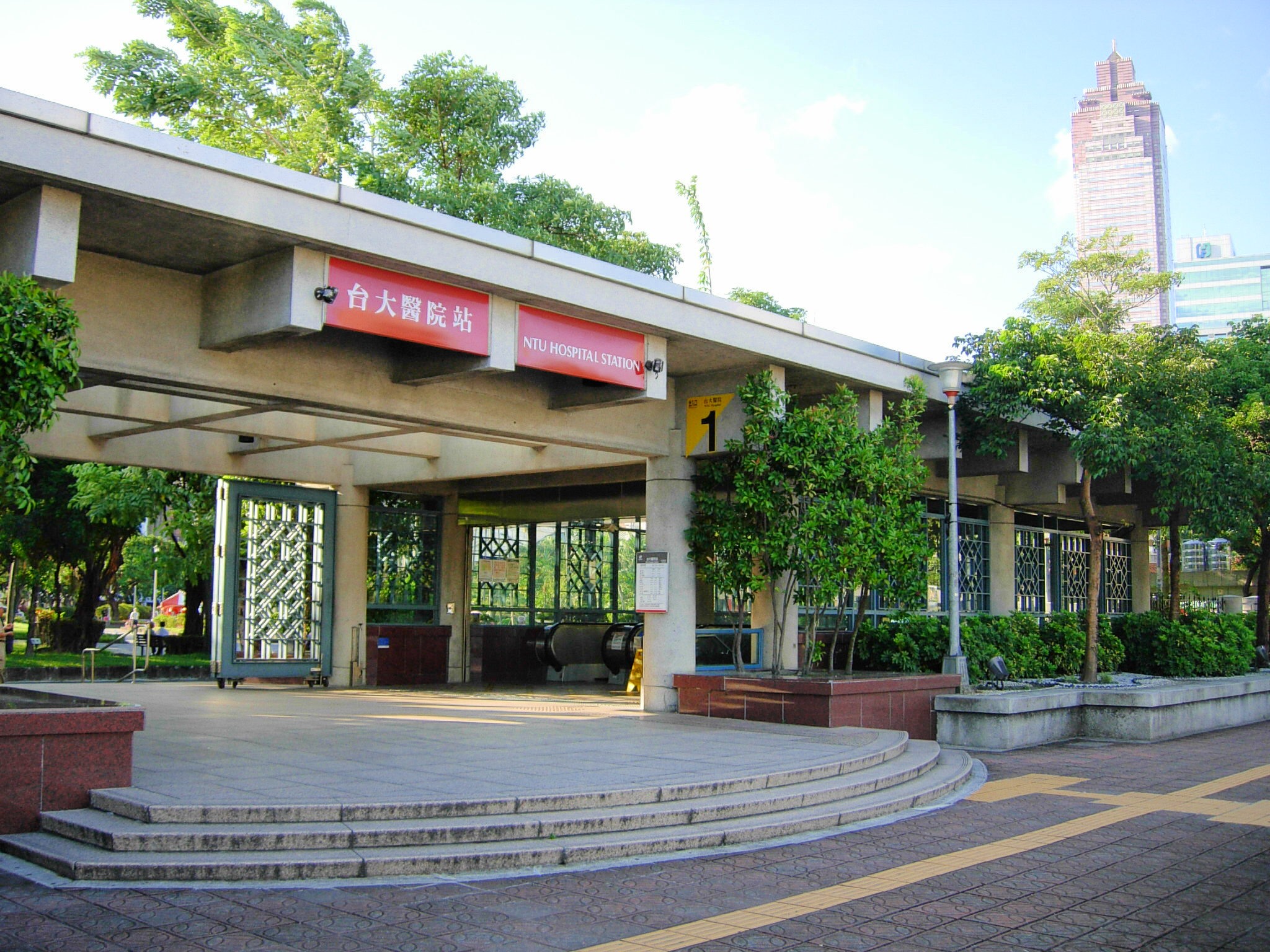
- Exit 1

Chinese name
- Traditional Chinese: 台大醫院
- Simplified Chinese: 台大医院
Transcriptions
Standard Mandarin
- Hanyu Pinyin: Taídà Yīyuàn
- Bopomofo: ㄊㄞˊ ㄉㄚˋ ㄧ ㄩㄢˋ
- Wade–Giles: T'ai²-ta⁴ i-yüan⁴
Hakka
- Pha̍k-fa-sṳ: Thòi-thai Yî-yen
Southern Min
- Tâi-lô: Tâi-tāi Pēnn-īnn (台大病院)

General information
- Location: B1F; Zhongzheng, Taipei; Taiwan
- Coordinates: 25.0421°N 121.5163°E
- System: Taipei metro station

Construction
- Structure type: Underground
- Cycle facilities: Access available

Other information
- Station code: R09
- Website: web.metro.taipei/e/stationdetail2010.asp?ID=R09-050

History
- Opened: 1998-12-24

Passengers
- 2017: 15.793 million per year ▼1.16%
- Rank: (Ranked 43 of 119)

Services
Preceding station	Taipei Metro	Following station
CKS Memorial Hall towards Xiangshan or Daan	Tamsui–Xinyi Line	Taipei Main Station towards Tamsui or Beitou
Location

National Taiwan University Hospital (Chinese: 台大醫院; pinyin: Tái dà yīyuàn) is a metro station in Taipei, Taiwan served by Taipei Metro. It is a station on the Tamsui–Xinyi Line.

== Station overview ==
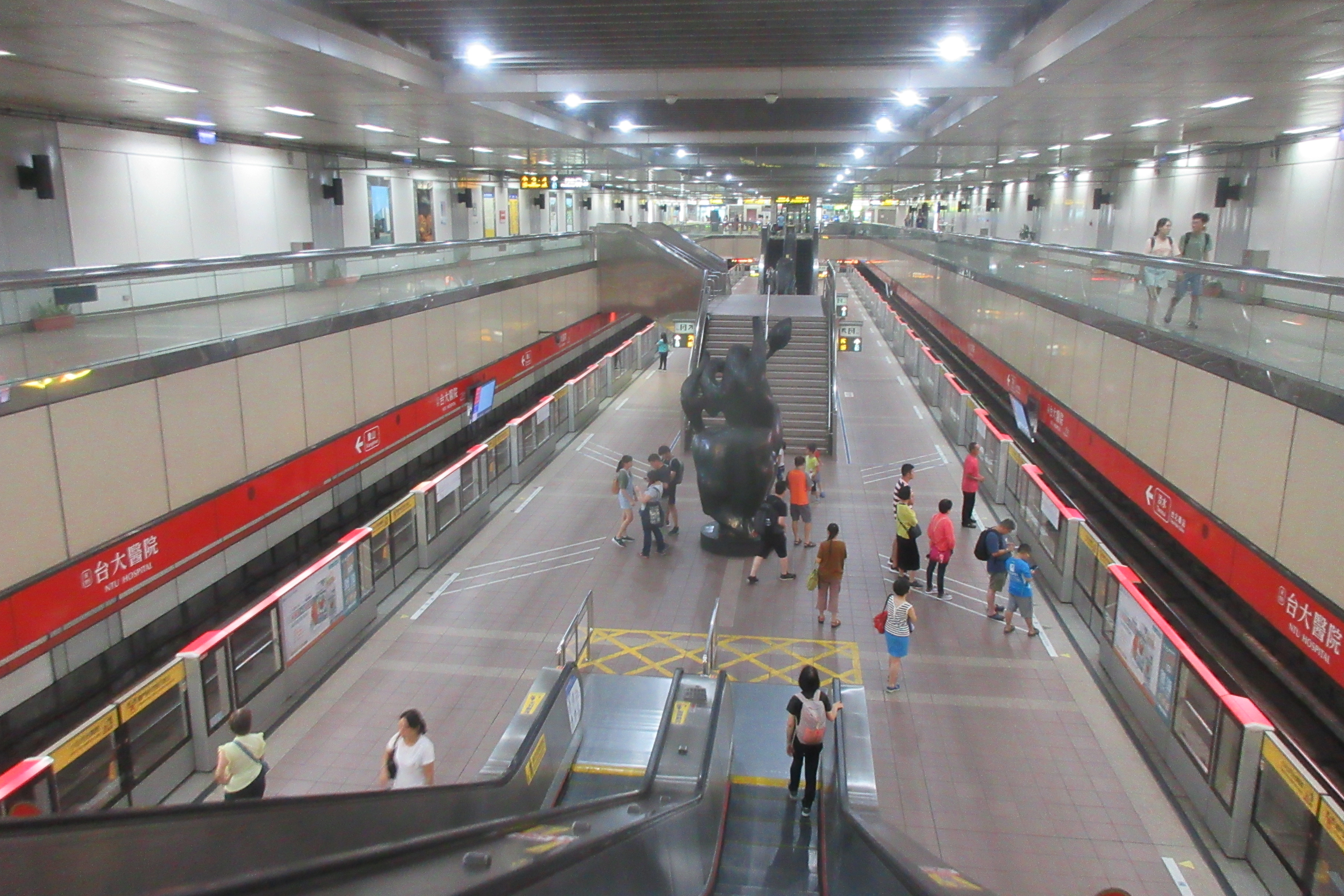
NTU Hospital station platform

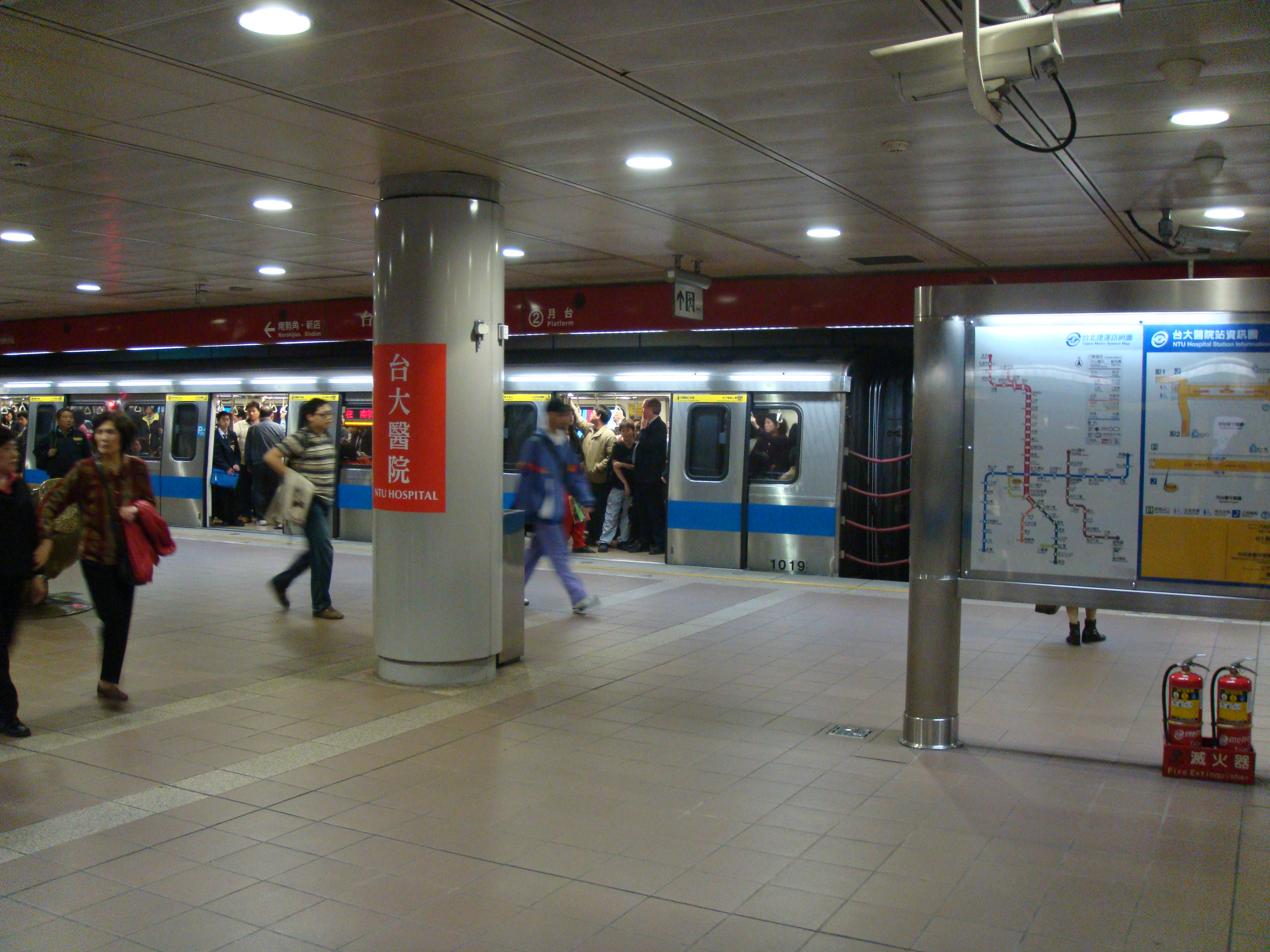
NTU Hospital station platform level

This is a two-level, underground station with an island platform. It has four exits, two of which are equipped with elevators. It is named for the nearby National Taiwan University Hospital. The station has exits to National Taiwan University Hospital, National Taiwan Museum and 228 Peace Memorial Park.

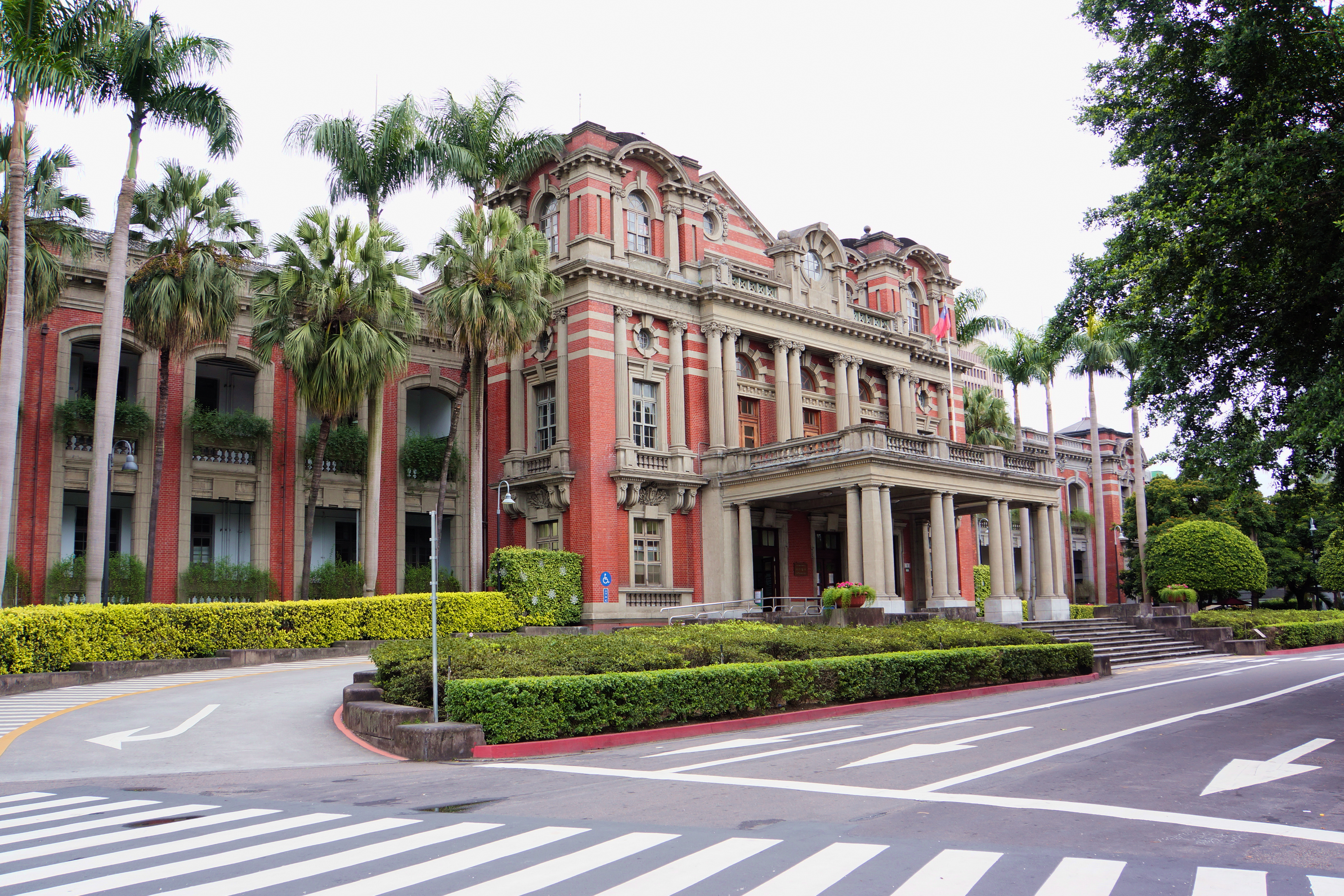
NTU Hospital west site building

=== Public art ===
Several pieces of public art are located on the platform, titled "The Suite of Hands" consisting of "Lotus Holding Hand", "Lotus in Heartful Hands", and "Small Park". These bronze and/or granite sculptures depict how hands, through gestures, can express human affection.

=== History ===
This station was opened for service on 24 December 1998.

On 10 October 2004, after the Madrid bombings, a man placed a bomb in the station. No injuries were reported.

== Station layout ==
Street level	Entrance/exit	Entrance/exit
B1	Concourse	Lobby, information desk, automatic ticket-dispensing machines, one-way faregates
B1	Concourse	Restrooms (south side outside paid area, near exit 1)
B2	Platform 1	← Tamsui–Xinyi line toward Tamsui / Beitou (R10 Taipei Main Station)
B2	Island platform, doors open on the left
B2	Platform 2	→ Tamsui–Xinyi line toward Xiangshan / Daan (R08 Chiang Kai-shek Memorial Hall) →

== First and last train timings ==
The first and last train timings at NTU Hospital station are as follows:

Destination	First train		Last train
Destination	Mon − Fri	Sat − Sun and P.H.	Daily
Tamsui–Xinyi line
R28 Tamsui	06:08	06:08	00:33
R01guangci/fengtian palace station	06:01	06:01	01:00

== Around the station ==
- Museum of Medical Humanities
