= Embassy of Haiti, Taipei =

Embassy of Haiti in the Republic of China 海地駐中華民國大使館
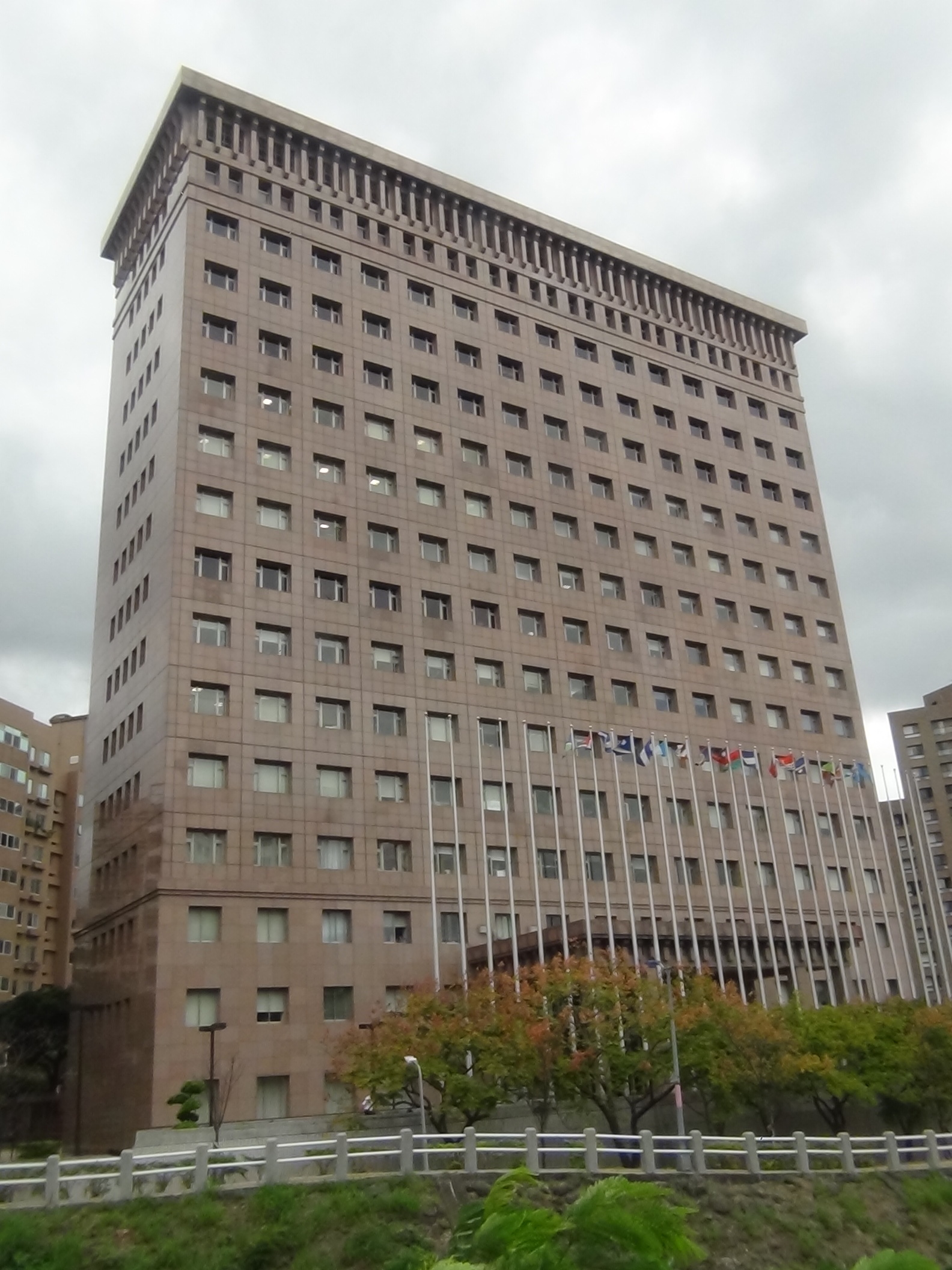
- The Embassy of Haiti at the Diplomatic Quarter
- Location: Shilin, Taipei, Taiwan
- Ambassador: Roudy Stanley Penn

The Embassy of Haiti in the Republic of China (French: Ambassade d' Haïti en République de Chine, Chinese: 海地駐中華民國大使館; pinyin: Hǎidì zhù zhōnghuá mínguó dàshǐ guǎn) is the embassy of the Republic of Haiti in Taipei, Republic of China (Taiwan).

Diplomatic relations between Haiti and the Republic of China were established on April 25, 1956. Haiti was initially represented in Taipei through its embassy in Tokyo, Japan. The permanent mission in Taipei was opened on August 16, 1981.

Haiti is one of twelve countries which recognise the Republic of China over the People's Republic of China, the latter of which Haiti has never had diplomatic relations with.

== See also ==
- Haiti–Taiwan relations
- List of diplomatic missions in Taiwan
- List of diplomatic missions of Haiti
