= National Taiwan University Hospital =

Hospital in Zhongzheng, Taipei, Taiwan

National Taiwan University Hospital 國立台灣大學醫學院附設醫院
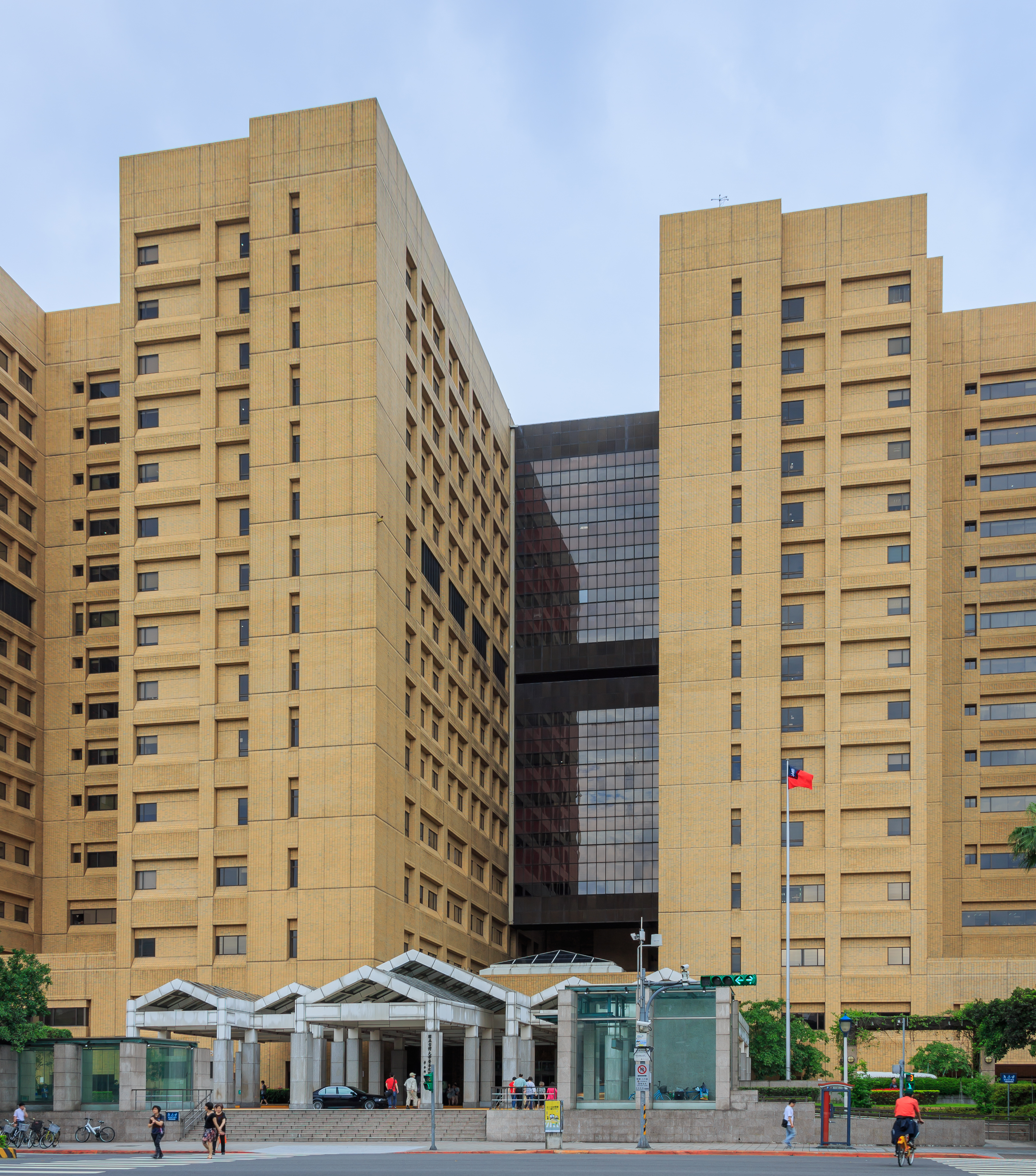

Geography
- Location: Zhongzheng, Taipei, Taiwan
- Coordinates: 25.042716°N 121.517552°E

Organisation
- Type: Teaching
- Affiliated university: National Taiwan University

Services
- Beds: 2,400

History
- Founded: 1895

Links
- Website: www.ntuh.gov.tw

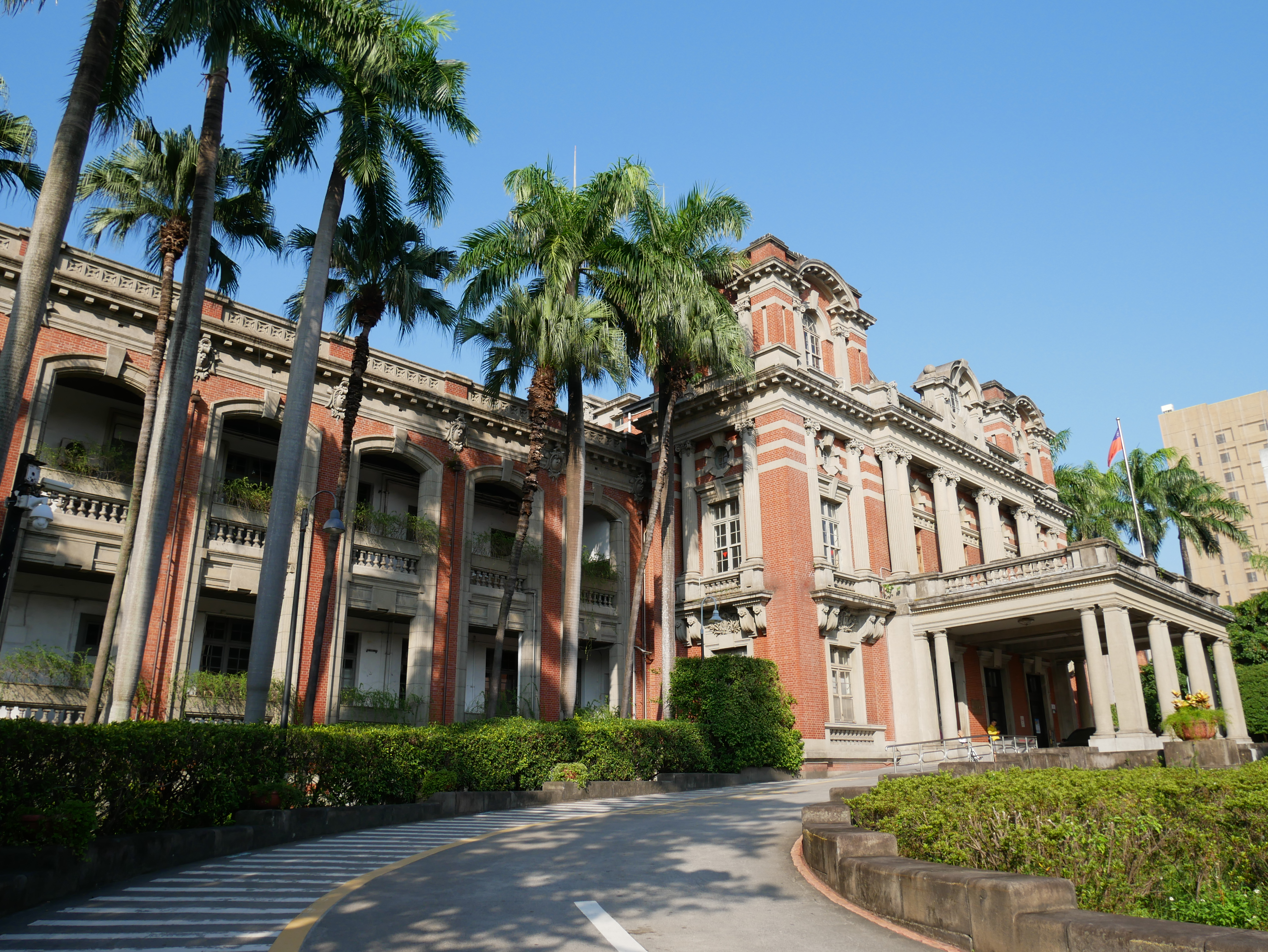
The older wing of the National Taiwan University Hospital dates to 1912.

The National Taiwan University Hospital (NTUH; Chinese: 國立台灣大學醫學院附設醫院; pinyin: Guólì Táiwān Dàxué Yīxuéyuàn Fùshè Yīyuàn) is a university hospital located in the Zhongzheng District of Taipei, Taiwan, affiliated with National Taiwan University (NTU). It has branches throughout Taiwan and is also the largest public hospital in the country.

The hospital was established in Daitōtei (modern-day Dadaocheng) during Japanese rule on June 18, 1895, under the direction supervision of the Governor-General of Taiwan. The hospital was incorporated into the medical school of Taihoku Imperial University in 1937, then adopted its current name in 1945 when the university was renamed NTU.

On 19 October 1991, a large new building complex on the so-called East Site was completed. The (new) East and (old) West Sites together have more than 4,000 employees, serving 2,000 inpatients and 8,000 outpatients daily. Advanced surgical, angiographical, and endoscopic procedures are routinely performed.

== Transportation ==
The hospital is accessible within walking distance East from NTU Hospital Station of the Taipei Metro.

== See also ==
- Museum of Medical Humanities
- Healthcare in Taiwan
- List of hospitals in Taiwan
- National Taiwan University Hospital HIV-positive organ donation case
