= Haiti–Taiwan relations =

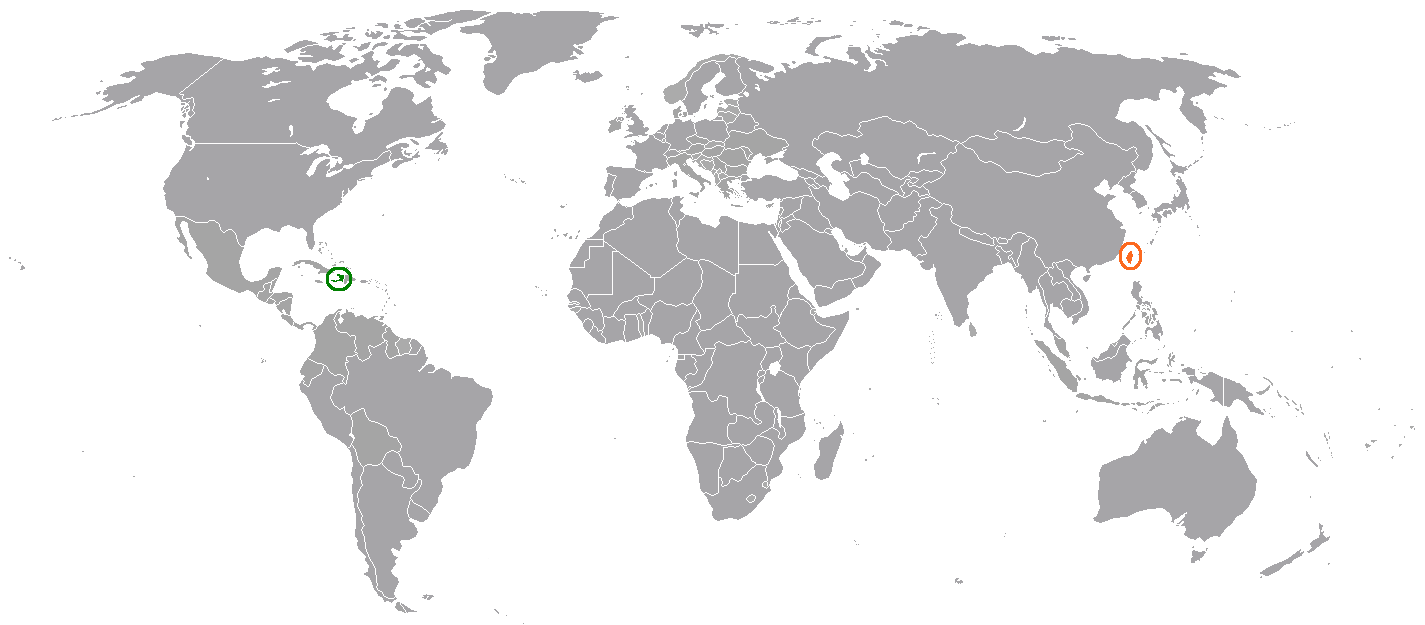

- Haiti: Taiwan

Diplomatic mission
- Embassy of Haiti in Taiwan: Embassy of the Republic of China (Taiwan) in Haiti

Envoy
- Station Chief Francilien Victorin: Ambassador Guillaume Cheng-hao Hu

Haiti–Taiwan relations or ROC–Haitian relations refer to the bilateral relations between the Republic of Haiti and the Republic of China (Taiwan). Haiti maintains an embassy in Taipei and Taiwan maintains an embassy in Port-au-Prince.

== History ==
Haiti recognized the Republic of China (ROC) over the People's Republic of China (PRC) on April 25, 1956, as the sole sovereign power of "China" and have since maintained formal diplomatic relations with the ROC.

Haiti is one of 14 nations that recognize the ROC officially. The Sino-Haitian Treaty of Amity was signed on February 15, 1966.

In 2018, Dominican Republic choose to recognize the PRC over ROC, culminating in increased interest in Haiti among Taiwanese and Chinese governments. In 1993, the PRC opened a commercial office in Haiti in a bid to start the process of formalizing diplomatic relations however it did not come to fruition. The ROC, in a bid to maintain relations, has offered US$150 million to Haiti for development of rural power grids, following the destruction of much of the infrastructure in the 2010 Haiti earthquake.

Taiwan's embassy in Haiti is among the few foreign embassies that remained open since the start of the Haitian crisis and the assassination of Haiti's president in 2021.

== Defense and security ==
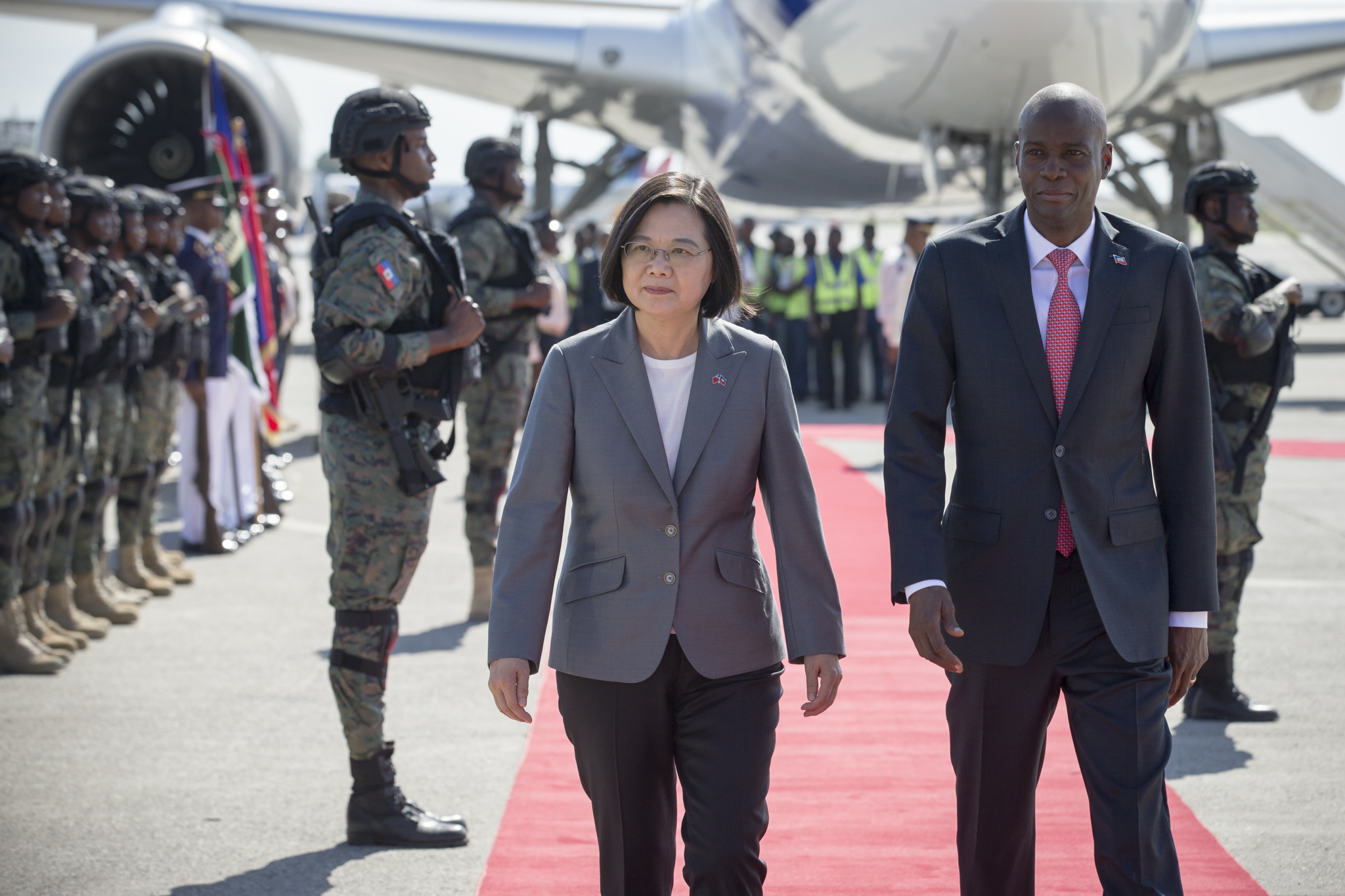

Taiwan was the largest international donor to the FAd'H, after its reinstatement in 2017. 100 sets of protection equipment and 100 T-91 rifles were donated during former Taiwanese president Tsai Ing-wen’s visit to Port-au-Prince in 2019.

In August 2024, 100 of 400 total personal protection kits were donated to the FAd'H via the Taiwan Embassy. The outgoing ambassador Wen-Jiann Ku reiterated that Taiwan has been a supporter of the Haitian Armed Forces since its remobilization. "...Taiwan was the first and only supplier of the army.", he said in an interview with Le Nouvelliste on 2 September 2024. Ku also showed his satisfaction with other international partners showing the will to support, supply, and work with the Armed Forces. "...After discussions with the authorities, Taiwan will furnish other equipment to the army and they are already on their way to be delivered to Haiti.", he said, confirming that additional military equipment are already on the way. Taiwan donated the other 300 kits to the Haitian National Police. They had also donated Humvees to the border police.

== Bilateral visits ==
On 11 August 1992, Haitian President Jean-Bertrand Aristide, while in exile following the September 1991 military coup, visited Taiwan for a meeting with Taiwanese President Lee Teng-hui.

Taiwanese Vice President Lee Yuan-tsu attended the inauguration of Haitian President René Préval on 7 February 1996.

On 28 May 2018, Haitian President Jovenel Moise visited Taiwan following the announcement of the Dominican Republic severing ties with Taiwan. Tsai Ing-wen and Moise discussed developmental aid for Haiti and maintaining relations with Tsai stating "Even though Taiwan and Haiti are separated by large geographic distance, both share democratic and freedom values. In many areas, both sides have seen the results of the long-term and deep partnership".

== See also ==
- Foreign relations of Haiti
- Foreign relations of Taiwan
