= Haitian passport =

Travel document of the Republic of Haiti

Haitian passport; Passeport haïtien Paspò ayisyen
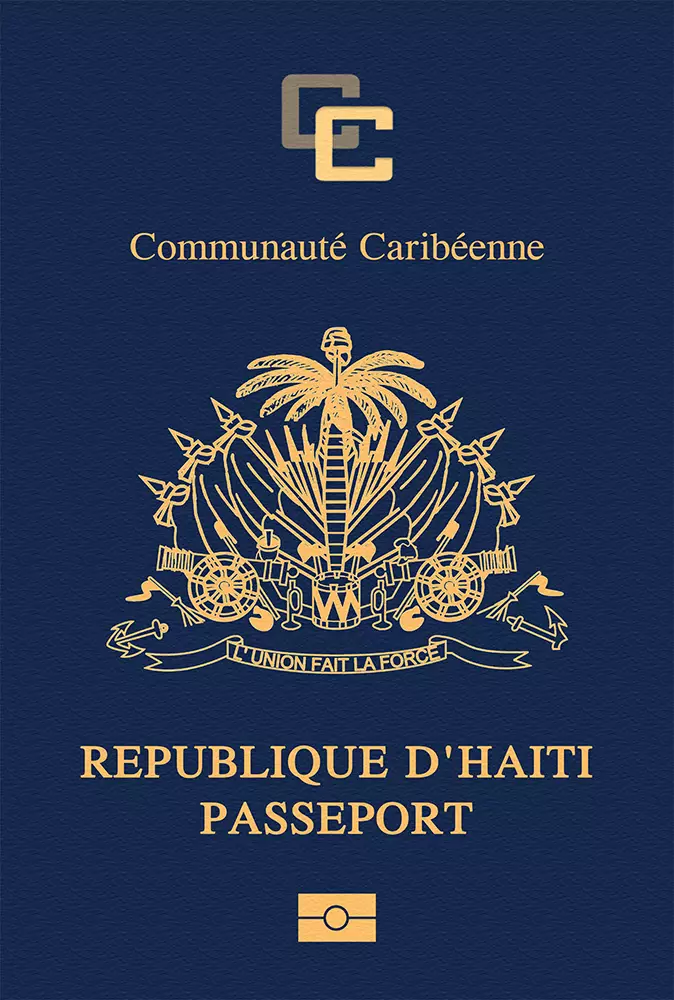
- Front cover of a Haitian biometric passport
- Type: Passport
- Issued by: Haiti
- First issued: 1 January 2009 (machine-readable passports); 2015 (biometric passports)
- Purpose: Identification
- Eligibility: Haitian citizenship
- Expiration: 10 years

The Haitian passport (French: Passeport haïtien; Haitian Creole: Paspò ayisyen) is issued to citizens of Haiti for international travel. Despite appearing as a CARICOM passport, it is not a standardized CARICOM common passport as they are still treated as national passports and the holders do not gain the regional travel privileges from CARICOM passports. The Haitian government has begun rolling out biometric passports in 2015, however it has been inconsistent due to political instability. According to the 2026 Henley Passport Index, It is currently the weakest passport in all of Latin America and the Caribbean, having visa-free or visa on arrival access to only 48 countries and territories, and ranking 83rd in terms of global freedom.

To obtain a Haitian passport, one must be a Haitian citizen and furnish proof thereof. As of 2013, people who were born in Haiti but who later changed their nationality may obtain Haitian passports.

== Physical appearance ==
The Haitian passport has a dark blue cover with the Haitian Coat of Arms in the middle embossed with gold foil. The CARICOM logo and the words "Communauté Caribéenne" (Caribbean Community) are printed above representing the country's political membership, and the official name of the country "République d'Haïti" is printed at the bottom in French with the word "Passeport" printed below it.

=== Identification page ===
- Photo of the passport holder
- Type ("P" for passport)
- Country code
- Passport serial number
- Last name and First name of the passport holder
- Citizenship
- Date of birth (DD. MM. YYYY)
- Gender (M for men or F for women)
- Birth place
- Date of issue (DD. MM. YYYY)
- Passport holder's signature
- Expiration date (DD. MM. YYYY)

The passport is written in Haitian Creole and French.

== History ==
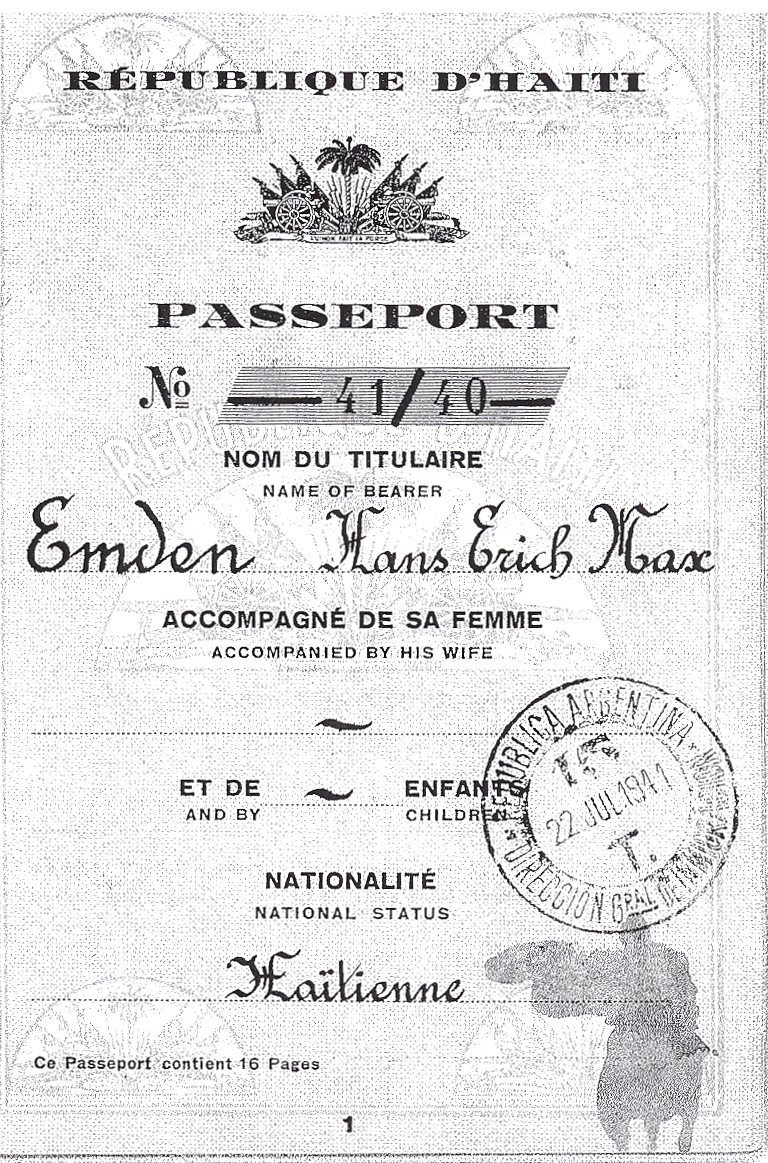
Passport issued to Hans Erich Max Emden by the Haitian government, who managed to escape the Holocaust. In 1941 he used it to travel to Argentina

Between 1937 and 1942, a Haitian passport and Haitian citizenship could be obtained without visiting the country. About 100 Eastern European Jews used this method to escape Europe. At about this time, United States officials became aware of a 'passports for sale' racket carried out with the complicity of the Haitian government. In return for a substantial loan from a Swiss bank, 100 genuine signed passports were made available for sale in Germany, reportedly for $3,000 each.

In 2011, the launch of biometric or epassports was announced.

== Visa requirements ==
Visa requirements for Haitian citizens Haiti Visa-free eVisa Visa available both on arrival or online Visa on arrival Visa required

As of 2026, Haitian citizens had visa-free or visa on arrival access to 48 countries and territories, ranking the Haitian passport 83rd in terms of travel freedom according to the Henley visa restrictions index.

== See also ==
- Visa requirements for Haitian citizens
