= National Taiwan University Hospital HIV-positive organ donation case =

2011 medical incident in Taiwan

On 24 August 2011, the organ transplant team at the National Taiwan University Hospital (NTUH) failed to identify that a donor had previously been diagnosed with HIV due to an error in recording the HIV test result in the donor’s blood report. As a result, five transplant recipients were exposed to the risk of infection.

This incident was the first known case in Taiwan involving the transplantation of organs from an HIV-positive donor, shocking the nation and becoming a major news event. After the medical team administered preventive antiretroviral treatment, follow-up examinations showed that none of the affected patients had contracted HIV. However, the relationship between their immune responses and potential HIV activity remained undetermined.

Following an investigation, the Control Yuan initiated impeachment proceedings against Ko Wen-je, who was the leading physician of the NTUH transplant team at the time. The impeachment announcement was made while Ko was abroad attending a conference and unable to return to Taiwan to respond, which triggered further controversy.

== Background ==
After a team led by Professor Lee Chun-jen of the National Taiwan University College of Medicine completed Asia’s first living-donor kidney transplant in 1968 and the first cadaveric kidney transplant in 1969, organ transplantation began to develop within Taiwan’s medical community. However, a comprehensive organ donation system had not yet been established at the time; hospitals independently sought donors and carried out transplant procedures on their own.

In 2001, Chen Hsi-sheng, a professor in the Department of English at Tamkang University, suffered from fulminant hepatitis B, which resulted in liver failure. His students appealed online for an immediate organ transplant to save his life, drawing significant media attention. At the time, the law only permitted organ donation from relatives within the third degree of kinship. Minister of Health Lee Ming-liang publicly announced in the Legislative Yuan that he was willing to extend the limit to relatives within the fifth degree. However, no suitable liver donor could be found, and Chen passed away. In the aftermath, Minister Lee began working on establishing a formalized organ donation and transplantation procedure.

In 2002, the Organ Donation and Transplantation Registry Center was established to oversee organ donations and transplant surgeries across Taiwan. Due to the absence of a functioning registration system, however, the center was initially unable to operate effectively. Ko Wen-je, then director of the Trauma and Emergency Center at National Taiwan University Hospital, was commissioned by the Department of Health’s Bureau of Medical Affairs to develop the organ donation registration system as a special project. In 2005, the organ donation and transplant allocation system was launched. The procedures for organ testing, the design of forms, matching rules, computer software and hardware, and the framework for organ procurement organizations were largely designed and coordinated by Ko. Taiwan’s organ donation and transplantation system was established on this basis.

In 2011, the system faced its most serious medical error since its introduction. Due to a mistake made during the verbal reporting of laboratory results, the NTUH transplant team transplanted organs from a donor who had previously been diagnosed with HIV. The incident attracted intense media scrutiny and exposed weaknesses within Taiwan’s organ donation system.

== Incident ==
On 23 August 2011, a man fell from a building in Hsinchu City and was taken to Nanmen Hospital for emergency treatment. After resuscitation efforts failed, his family agreed to donate his organs. As Nanmen Hospital was one of the partner institutions in the National Taiwan University Hospital (NTUH) organ donation network, the NTUH organ donation team went to the hospital to obtain the family’s consent and to carry out preliminary procedures such as blood testing.

While NTUH’s emergency laboratory was conducting blood tests, the NTUH transplant coordinator, who had traveled to Hsinchu to handle the donation process, was not physically present at the hospital and therefore unable to consult the hospital information system directly. The coordinator contacted a medical technologist by phone and asked for the test results to be relayed verbally. The coordinator then recorded the results by hand on the report sheet. During the call, the technologist reported the HIV screening value as 56.7 and the result as reactive, but the coordinator was unable to interpret this information. After writing down the numerical value, the coordinator incorrectly marked the donor’s HIV test result as negative (non-reactive). This erroneous information was then entered into the Organ Donation and Transplantation Registry Center’s database.

On 24 August, following routine procedure, the NTUH coordinator entered the handwritten test results into the registry system before the transplant team’s supervising physician had reviewed or verified the information. That evening, transplant teams from NTUH and National Cheng Kung University Hospital arrived at Nanmen Hospital to procure the organs, retrieving the heart, lungs, liver, and both kidneys. The organs were then transported to NTUH and NCKU Hospital for transplantation surgeries, which were completed in the early hours of 25 August.

On 26 August, 48 hours after the test results had been logged, the NTUH coordinator contacted the laboratory by phone, as usual, requesting verification of the donor’s test report in the hospital information system and asking for the report to be emailed. Upon comparing the emailed results with the handwritten report, the coordinator discovered that the HIV test result should have been recorded as reactive, but it had been mistakenly marked as negative on the handwritten sheet. The coordinator immediately informed the NTUH transplant physicians and requested a second test. That evening, the results confirmed that the donor had been infected with HIV during his lifetime, though his family had been unaware of this. NTUH and NCKU Hospital immediately administered antiretroviral treatment to the five transplant recipients.

On 27 August, NTUH informed the families of the transplant recipients that the donor had been HIV-positive. NTUH also held a press conference to explain the situation to the public. After the administration of preventive antiretroviral therapy and subsequent follow-up examinations, none of the affected patients were found to have contracted HIV. However, the relationship between their immune responses and potential HIV activity remained uncertain.

== Systemic issues ==
In reviewing the system after the incident, Ko Wen-je concluded that the core problem was that the system was “inexpensive and efficient, but unsafe.” The lack of a review mechanism was a significant factor contributing to the error. However, when the system was first established, such a mechanism was not included because it would have increased personnel costs for hospitals. Ideally, the organ procurement team should be structurally separated from the transplant team to avoid role confusion, but due to concerns over efficiency and staffing costs, this separation was never implemented in Taiwan.

Although the NTUH emergency laboratory detected the donor’s HIV antibody test as reactive, regulations at the time required that such results be interpreted by a licensed physician. Due to a machine malfunction during the incident, communication between the medical technologist and the coordinator broke down, and no qualified physician participated in interpreting the results. The medical technologist also failed to correct the coordinator when the coordinator repeated the incorrect interpretation twice during the phone call, resulting in the coordinator recording the wrong result. Although the coordinator wrote down the correct numerical value, the failure to verify the interpretation with the responsible physician before entering the data into the organ transplant system became the primary cause of the error.

As of [date needed], the National Science Council has commissioned professional researchers to study these systemic issues, with findings to be released upon completion.

== Administrative disciplinary process ==
On 30 August, the United Evening News reported that Ko Wen-je had voluntarily requested disciplinary action. However, on 1 September, Ko stated in an interview that he had never said such a thing. He also joked, “Everyone else is innocent; only I am guilty. I’m already prepared to go to prison and stay in the cell next to Chen Shui-bian.”

On 4 November, the Department of Health completed its investigation report and concluded that Ko Wen-je had committed managerial negligence, recommending that he be referred to the Taipei City Department of Health for disciplinary action. Ko expressed dissatisfaction with the conclusion. On 6 November, Ko stated in an interview, “Whenever something goes wrong, it’s always someone else’s fault. The Department of Health has never said what it needs to improve.” He strongly criticized the Department for ignoring procedural justice and lacking self-reflection.On 16 November, Ko further commented, “I didn’t expect that every responsibility related to this incident on Earth would be assigned to me,” asserting that the HIV transplant error resulted from systemic flaws rather than personal misconduct.

In June 2012, the Taipei City Department of Health convened the Physicians Disciplinary Committee regarding this incident. The committee determined that Ko Wen-je and eight other NTUH physicians had acted in accordance with existing regulations and that the medical error was unintentional and unavoidable. The committee resolved not to impose disciplinary action.

== Disciplinary actions and controversies ==
On 30 August 2011, National Taiwan University Hospital (NTUH) and National Cheng Kung University Hospital each submitted their own “Review Report on the HIV-Positive Organ Transplant Incident.”

The Control Yuan conducted an investigation into the causes of the incident. While issuing corrective measures for multiple systemic failures within the Department of Health and NTUH, it concluded that Ko Wen-je bore primary responsibility. On 14 August 2012, nearly one year after the incident, Ko was impeached by the Control Yuan and the case was forwarded to the Civil Service Disciplinary Committee under the Judicial Yuan. The impeachment document stated that as the head of NTUH’s organ transplant program, Ko failed to review the mechanism for interpreting organ donor test results, did not follow standard medical procedures for reading such results, and did not establish comprehensive training for transplant coordinators. He authorized a coordinator with limited experience to carry out critical pre-transplant procedures without proper supervision, ultimately causing harm to five families.

In mid-August, some members of the medical community launched a petition expressing dissatisfaction with the Control Yuan. On the evening of 14 August, Ko stated that he had not read the full impeachment document, adding, “I don’t want to read it, I don’t want to know—let them do whatever they want! This system existed long before NTUH’s incident and had been used more than 5,000 times. So what do they want?”On 17 August, Ko criticized the Control Yuan, saying it was treating the public with a “Cultural Revolution-style public struggle session.”

On 18 August 2013, the Civil Service Disciplinary Committee ruled that Ko Wen-je had failed in his supervisory duties in the HIV-positive organ transplant case, deciding to demote him by two ranks. NTUH implemented the penalty by lowering Ko’s salary grade (from the civil service Grade 740 to Grade 680).

On 20 August, Ko’s wife, physician Peggy Chen (Chen Pei-chi), held a press conference despite illness, expressing dissatisfaction with the ruling. She argued that the committee had used an organ donation procedure revised after the incident to judge Ko’s actions, and stated that NTUH had not disclosed the truth.On 21 August, she further accused NTUH of falsifying procedures to shift blame onto Ko.On 22 August, she stated that legal action against NTUH was possible, saying, “No truth, no forgiveness.”

On 9 October, during a lecture titled “Review of the HIV Organ Donation Incident,” Ko stated that “the investigation process had absolutely no procedural justice,” adding that if the case were viewed again 50 years later, “it would still feel dirty,” and that “the only bright spot was that someone (himself) did not abandon his subordinates and run away.”

Chu Wu-hsien, who served as Minister of Civil Service during the Chen Shui-bian administration, argued that under Interpretation No. 308 (1992) of the Council of Grand Justices, teachers and civil servants are classified differently. As Ko held both academic and civil service status, Chu claimed that the Civil Service Disciplinary Committee lacked jurisdiction and that its decision was unlawful, recommending that Ko file for retrial. The committee maintained that administrative positions within NTUH were covered by the Civil Service Disciplinary Act. Some argued that since the Taipei City Medical Disciplinary Committee had already decided not to discipline Ko, the Civil Service Disciplinary Committee should not impose further sanctions. Ko also raised this argument, invoking the principle of ne bis in idem. The committee responded that medical discipline and civil service discipline differ in nature, purpose, and procedures, and that Ko misunderstood the legal principle.

Ko petitioned the Civil Service Disciplinary Committee for reconsideration. In January 2015, after Ko had assumed office as Mayor of Taipei, the committee found that all evidence he submitted had already been examined in the original ruling. His petition lacked valid grounds and was therefore dismissed.Ko did not pursue further appeals.

== Aftermath ==
The five recipients who received the transplanted organs continued long-term antiretroviral therapy, and follow-up examinations up to August 2014 showed no signs of HIV infection. This outcome prompted domestic discussions on the possibility of allowing organ donation and transplantation involving HIV-positive individuals. By late July, the Ministry of Health and Welfare reached a preliminary conclusion that HIV-positive individuals should be allowed to donate organs to other HIV-positive recipients. However, the actual legal amendments and implementation details had yet to be finalized. If the relevant regulations were to pass in the future, although fewer than ten people per year would benefit, it would represent a significant step forward in medical humanitarianism.

Ko Wen-je stated that during this incident, he felt he had been targeted by the government, which was focused solely on finding someone to blame. He said this experience was one of the main reasons he decided to enter politics and run in the 2014 Taipei mayoral election.
