= Museum of Medical Humanities =

Museum in Zhongzheng, Taipei, Taiwan

NTU Museum of Medical Humanities
- 醫學人文博物館
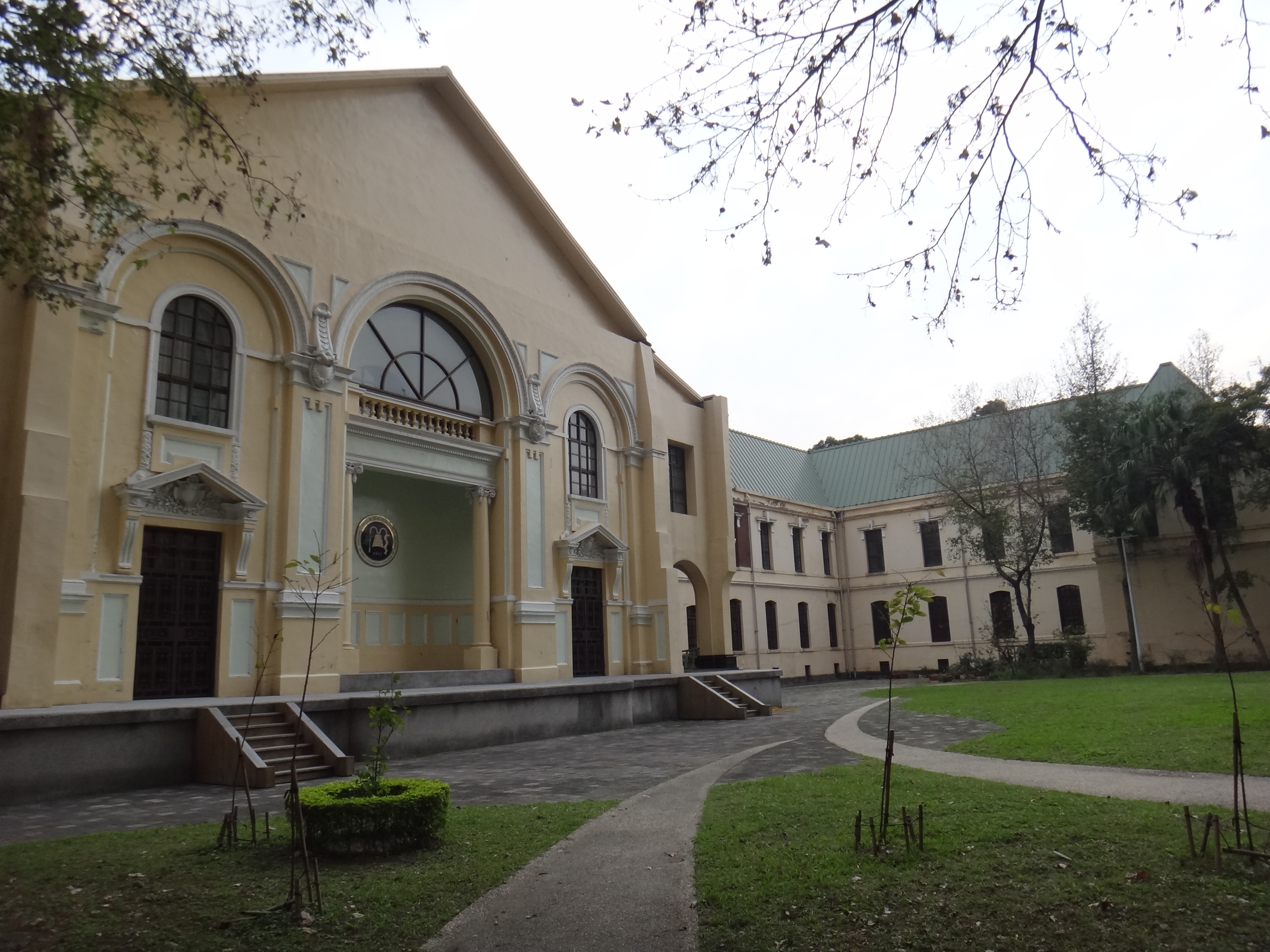
- Established: 21 February 1998
- Location: Zhongzheng, Taipei, Taiwan
- Coordinates: 25°02′23″N 121°31′07″E
- Type: museum
- Public transit access: NTU Hospital Station
- Website: Official website

The Museum of Medical Humanities (traditional Chinese: 醫學人文博物館; simplified Chinese: 医学人文博物馆; pinyin: Yīxué Rénwén Bówùguǎn) of National Taiwan University (NTU) is a museum about medical humanities at the NTU College of Medicine campus in Zhongzheng District, Taipei, Taiwan.

== History ==
The museum was opened on 21 February 1998.

== Exhibitions ==
The museum regularly holds special medical and cultural exhibitions, showcasing the contribution of the college to the medical development in various fields in Taiwan. It also provides teachers with educational and research information relating to medical humanities.

== Transportation ==
The museum is accessible within walking distance east from NTU Hospital Station of the Taipei Metro.

== See also ==
- List of museums in Taiwan
- National Taiwan University
- Healthcare in Taiwan
