= Visa policy of Haiti =

Policy on permits required to enter Haiti

Most visitors to Haiti may enter without a visa for up to 3 months.

However, citizens from certain countries must obtain a visa from one of the Haitian diplomatic missions. They may enter without a visa for up to 3 months if they are holding a valid visa or residence permit issued by any Schengen Area member state, Canada or the United States.

All non-Haitian passport holders must pay a tourist fee of USD 10 on arrival.

Visitors must hold passports that are valid for at least 6 months from the date of arrival.

== Visa policy map ==
Visa policy of Haiti Haiti Visa not required (3 months) Visa required

== Visa required in advance ==
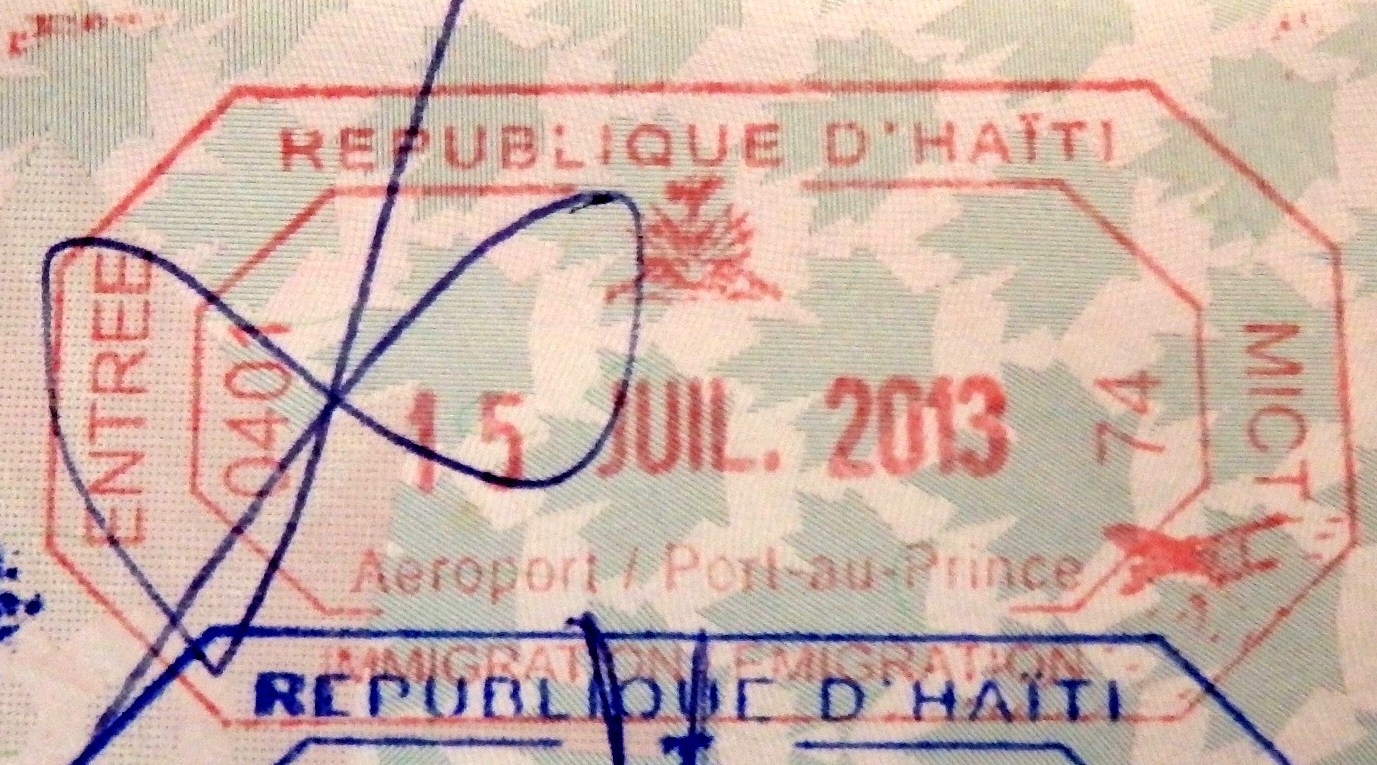
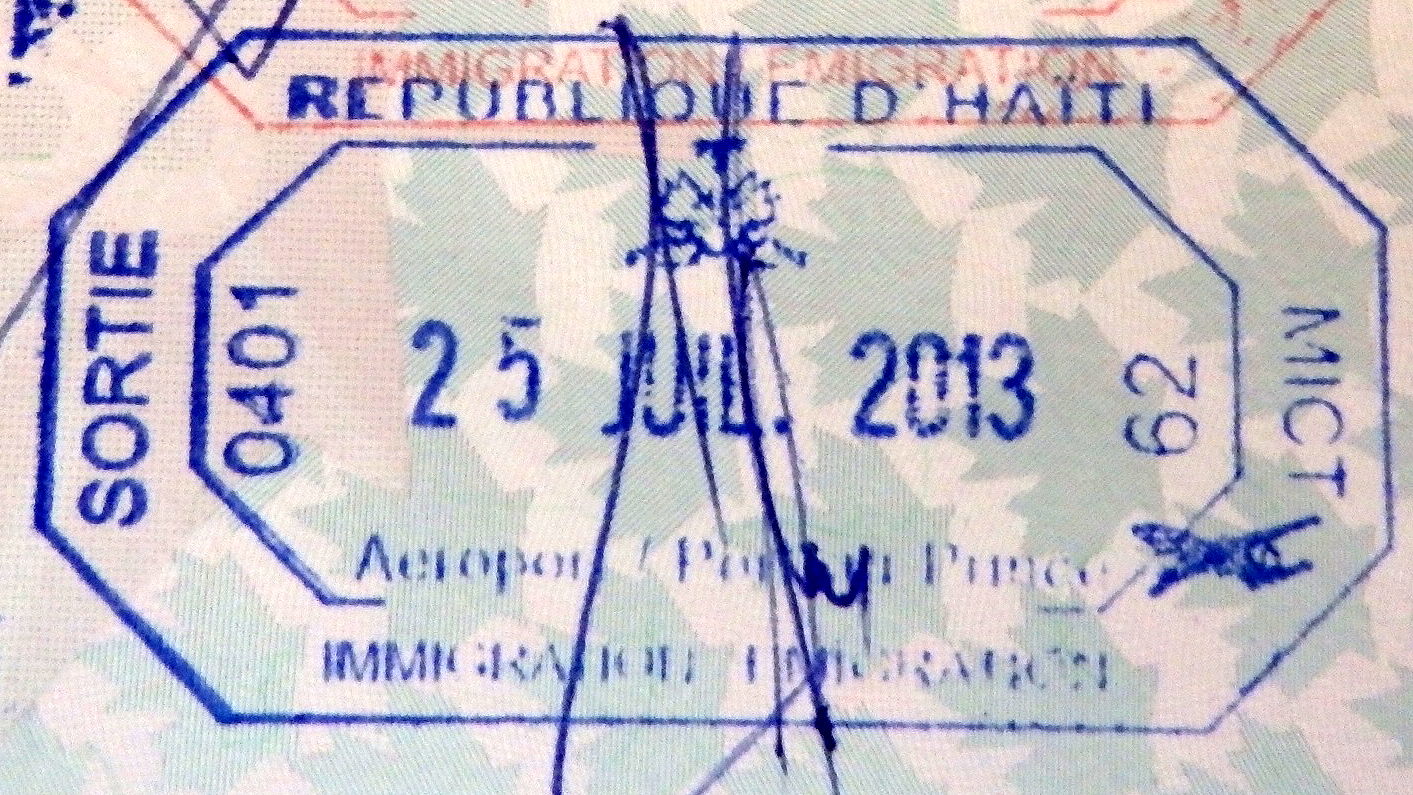
Entry and exit stamps.

As per the Embassy of Haiti in Washington, D.C.'s website, pre-arranged visas are required for citizens of the following countries:

- Colombia
- Cuba
- Dominican Republic
- Iran
- Libya
- Panama
- Syria
- Vietnam
- Yemen

However, according to IATA, pre-arranged visas are required for citizens of the following countries and territories:

- Colombia
- Cuba
- Dominican Republic
- Kosovo
- Panama

== See also ==
- Visa requirements for Haitian citizens
