= Foreign relations of Haiti =

Haiti was one of the original members of the League of Nations, and was one of the original members of the United Nations and several of its specialized and related agencies. It is also a founding member of the Organization of American States. Haiti also has diplomatic relations with the Republic of China, commonly known as Taiwan, instead of the People's Republic of China. Taiwan is one of Haiti's major trading partners and the two countries maintain very friendly relations. Haiti has also re-established very warm relations with Cuba in which a major act of bilateral cooperation has resulted in Cuba's large contribution of doctors to the country. The Haitian government has publicly shown admiration to Fidel Castro and his administration.

The international community rallied to Haiti's defense during the 1991 to 1994 period of illegal military rule. Thirty-one countries participated in the U.S.-led Multinational Force (MNF) which, acting under UN auspices, intervened in September 1994 to help restore the legitimate government and create a secure and stable environment in Haiti. At its peak, the MNF included roughly 21,000 troops, mostly Americans, and more than 1,000 international police monitors. Within six months, the troop level was gradually reduced as the MNF transitioned to a 6,000 strong peacekeeping force, the UN Mission in Haiti (UNMIH). UNMIH was charged with maintaining the secure environment, which the MNF had helped establish, as well as nurturing Haiti's new police force through the presence of 900 police advisors. A total of 38 countries participated in UNMIH.

In order to spur Haiti's social and economic recovery from three years of de facto military rule and decades of misrule before that, international development banks and donor agencies pledged in 1994 to provide over US$2 billion in assistance by 1999. Disbursements were largely conditioned on progress in economic reform. Parliamentary inaction, principally as a result of the political struggles and gridlock that plagued Haiti since 1996, resulted in the blockage of much of this assistance as disbursement conditions were not met. The electoral crisis that has brewed in the aftermath of the 21 May 2000 local and parliamentary elections has resulted in the blockage of most multilateral and bilateral assistance. Major donors are led by the United States, with the largest bilateral assistance program, and also include Canada, People's Republic of China, France, Germany, Japan, the Netherlands, Peru, the Philippines, Russia, South Korea, Republic of China (Taiwan) and the United Kingdom. Multilateral aid is coordinated through an informal grouping of major donors under the auspices of the World Bank which, in addition to the Inter-American Development Bank (IDB) and the European Union, is also a major source of Haitian development assistance.

Visas are required for citizens of Colombia and Panama due to the actions of nationals of those two countries in using Haiti as a drop-off point for narcotic drugs bound for the United States. Panama's proximity to Colombia and their thriving off-shore banking industry has lured many traffickers to use that nation and Haiti as bases for their activities. Citizens of the Dominican Republic also require visas to visit Haiti, not only due to the hostile, sometimes volatile relations between both nations, but also because since the late 1990s, the Dominican Republic has become another base for illicit drugs bound for the United States, which usually enter illegally via Puerto Rico. Once in Puerto Rico, drugs can easily reach the United States due to the absence of both immigration and customs between that island and the mainland.

Disputes – international: claims US-administered Navassa Island

Illicit drugs: major Caribbean transshipment point for cocaine en route to the US and Europe (see Illegal drug trade in Haiti)

== Diplomatic relations ==
List of countries which Haiti maintains diplomatic relations with:

#	Country	Date
1	France	17 April 1825
2	United Kingdom	1826
3	United States	1 October 1862
4	Venezuela	10 June 1864
5	Dominican Republic	9 November 1874
—	Holy See	1881
6	Italy	24 February 1898
7	Belgium	15 January 1902
8	Cuba	3 February 1904
9	Netherlands	21 November 1912
10	Brazil	1928
11	Mexico	11 July 1929
12	Peru	10 October 1929
13	Poland	18 November 1933
14	Chile	26 July 1934
15	Colombia	7 August 1936
16	Argentina	1 February 1939
17	Spain	20 September 1939
18	Sweden	31 March 1941
19	Switzerland	29 September 1941
20	Czech Republic	13 October 1943
21	Norway	28 October 1943
22	Uruguay	5 September 1945
23	Panama	11 October 1945
24	Philippines	6 July 1946
25	Denmark	12 August 1947
—	Sovereign Military Order of Malta	1947
26	Guatemala	1948
27	Ecuador	14 November 1949
28	Liberia	8 July 1952
29	Nicaragua	6 August 1952
30	Germany	23 September 1953
31	Canada	12 May 1954
32	Costa Rica	29 September 1955
33	Japan	23 April 1956
—	Republic of China	25 April 1956
34	Paraguay	2 October 1956
35	Bolivia	24 November 1957
36	Israel	12 September 1958
37	Turkey	14 November 1958
38	Ethiopia	5 April 1959
39	Lebanon	21 May 1959
40	Egypt	30 November 1960
41	Benin	December 1960
42	Ghana	February 1961
43	Senegal	4 February 1962
44	Mali	21 August 1962
45	South Korea	22 September 1962
46	Portugal	1965
47	Finland	29 September 1966
48	Guyana	6 October 1970
49	Barbados	5 August 1972
50	Trinidad and Tobago	31 January 1974
51	Iran	16 April 1974
52	Zambia	6 March 1975
53	Bahamas	26 August 1977
54	Nigeria	28 January 1978
55	Libya	18 January 1979
56	Suriname	1 March 1979
57	Saint Lucia	1979
58	Romania	9 May 1980
59	Cameroon	11 January 1981
60	Jamaica	26 August 1981
61	Gabon	14 October 1981
62	Niger	17 December 1981
63	Belize	1982
64	Guinea	10 January 1983
65	Austria	16 December 1983
66	Serbia	20 January 1984
67	Morocco	22 August 1985
68	Bahrain	15 September 1985
69	Democratic Republic of the Congo	1 October 1986
70	Thailand	30 October 1986
71	Ivory Coast	4 September 1987
72	Russia	2 June 1996
73	India	27 September 1996
74	Antigua and Barbuda	11 June 1997
75	Mozambique	25 September 1997
76	Turkmenistan	26 September 1997
77	Slovakia	26 September 1997
78	Vietnam	26 September 1997
79	South Africa	9 December 1997
80	Armenia	21 January 1999
81	Slovenia	30 March 1999
82	Croatia	15 October 1999
83	Belarus	29 October 1999
84	Saudi Arabia	17 January 2000
85	Seychelles	15 October 2000
86	Australia	28 November 2000
87	Singapore	16 February 2001
88	North Macedonia	11 April 2001
89	Malaysia	2001
90	Azerbaijan	9 May 2003
91	Hungary	11 July 2005
92	Iceland	18 November 2005
93	Luxembourg	10 January 2006
94	Latvia	14 December 2006
95	Andorra	19 January 2007
96	Burkina Faso	25 January 2007
97	Nepal	23 May 2007
98	Equatorial Guinea	24 June 2008
99	United Arab Emirates	21 October 2009
100	Estonia	31 March 2010
101	Lithuania	4 May 2010
102	Bosnia and Herzegovina	5 May 2010
103	Ukraine	23 September 2010
104	Georgia	16 December 2011
105	Ireland	26 January 2012
106	Moldova	7 June 2012
107	Honduras	3 August 2012
108	Kuwait	5 September 2012
109	Fiji	16 October 2012
110	Montenegro	17 October 2012
111	Timor-Leste	October 2012
112	Tuvalu	7 November 2012
113	Indonesia	21 November 2012
114	Sri Lanka	14 December 2012
115	Qatar	5 August 2013
116	Kazakhstan	20 September 2013
—	State of Palestine	27 September 2013
117	Pakistan	10 January 2014
118	Mongolia	14 January 2014
119	New Zealand	4 September 2014
120	Namibia	24 October 2014
121	Tajikistan	9 March 2016
122	El Salvador	6 September 2017
123	Mauritius	13 February 2018
124	Rwanda	15 August 2018
125	Kenya	20 September 2023
126	Kyrgyzstan	25 September 2026
127	Dominica	Unknown
128	Greece	Unknown
129	Grenada	Unknown
130	Saint Kitts and Nevis	Unknown
131	Saint Vincent and the Grenadines	Unknown

== Bilateral relations ==
=== Africa ===
Country	Formal relations began on	Notes
Benin	December 1960	See Benin–Haiti relations Both countries established diplomatic relations in December 1960 with opened Embassy of Haiti in Dahomey. It was closed in 1963 and reopened in Cotonou in February 2004. Embassy Haiti in Benin was finally closed on 11 December 2018. Haiti and Benin maintain diplomatic relations with a Haitian office in Cotonou, although Benin does not currently maintain an official diplomatic presence in the country due to the 2010 earthquake. Benin contributed a contingency of 32 police/civilian personnel to MINUSTAH. The two countries share an extensive cultural history by a way of the Atlantic slave trade and the resulting importing of Haitian Vodou as a religious force in Haitian society. The devastating earthquake was followed, among many reactions, by an outburst of solidarity prayers in Benin with the victims. Traditional ceremonies were organized to appease the spirits and seek the blessing of ancestors for the Haitians. In December 2018, Haiti closed its embassy in Cotonou. However, the embassy was re-opened in May 2026.: Benin does not have an accreditation for Haiti.; Haiti has an embassy in Cotonou.
Cote d'Ivoire		Haiti has an honorary consulate in Abidjan.; Ivory Coast has a liaison office in Port-au-Prince.
Gabon	14 October 1981	Both countries established diplomatic relations on 14 October 1981 when first ambassador of Haiti to Gabon with residence in Dakar Mr Victor Pierre Louis presented his credentials to President Bongo: Gabon is accredited to Haiti from its embassy in Washington, D.C., United States.; Haiti has an honorary consulate in Libreville.
Kenya	20 September 2023	See Haiti–Kenya relations Both countries established diplomatic relations on 20 September 2023. Kenya offered to lead the Multinational Security Support Mission to Haiti with a force of 1,000 police officers, and this offer was accepted by the UN Security Council in October 2023. Haitian prime minister Ariel Henry visited Kenya in March 2024 to sign the agreement to deploy the police officers to Haiti. Haiti is accredited to Kenya from its embassy in Pretoria. Kenya is accredited to Haiti from its embassy in Havana.
Liberia	8 July 1952	Haiti and Liberia recognized each other in 1864.; The two countries established treaties of friendship and commerce the same year.
Senegal		Haiti has an honorary consulate in Dakar.; Senegal is accredited to Haiti from its embassy in Washington, D.C., United States.

=== Americas ===
Country	Formal relations began on	Notes
Bahamas	26 August 1977	Both countries established diplomatic relations on 26 August 1977 See The Bahamas–Haiti relations: Haiti has an embassy Nassau.; The Bahamas has an embassy in Port-au-Prince.; There are over 80,000 Haitians living in the Bahamas.
Brazil	1928	See Brazil–Haiti relations Both countries established diplomatic relations in 1928.: Brazil has an embassy in Port-au-Prince.; Haiti has an embassy in Brasília, and consulates-general in Florianópolis, Salvador and in São Paulo.
Canada	12 May 1954	Both countries established diplomatic relations on 12 May 1954 See Canada–Haiti relations During the unsettled period from 1957 to 1990, Canada received many Haitian refugees, who now form a significant minority in Quebec. Canada participated in various international interventions in Haiti between 1994 and 2004, and continues to provide substantial aid to Haiti, the second poorest country in the western hemisphere.: Canada has an embassy in Port-au-Prince.; Haiti has an embassy in Ottawa and a consulate-general in Montreal.
Chile		See Chile–Haiti relations Chile sent 650 peacekeeping troops to the island as part of the United Nations peace keeping mission. Praising the work of the Chilean policemen in Haiti, National Police official Javiera Blanco said, "Even though today there is a need for the key presence of this mission, which is in mid term, the exit should be prepared for, considering that the country (Haiti) must take those responsibilities and build their capacities to do what is done by our mission." The police are planned to withdraw from Haiti in 2011.: Haiti has an embassy in Santiago.; Chile has an embassy in Port-au-Prince.
Colombia	7 August 1936	Both countries established diplomatic relations on 7 August 1936 when Envoy Extraordinary and Minister Plenipotentiary of Colombia Ricardo Gutiérrez Lee has presented his credentials to Haiti. See Colombia–Haiti relations: Haiti has an embassy in Bogotá.; Colombia is accredited to Haiti from its embassy in Santo Domingo, Dominican Republic. Colombia reopened its consulate in Port-au-Prince on December 15, 2023, after 2 decades of consular absence. The Consul is Vilma Velásquez
Cuba	3 February 1904	Both countries established diplomatic relations on 3 February 1904, which were interrupted on September 28, 1959, and later resumed on February 6, 1996. See Cuba–Haiti relations: Haiti has an embassy in Havana.; Cuba has an embassy in Port-au-Prince.
Dominican Republic	9 November 1874	Both countries established diplomatic relations on 9 November 1874 See Dominican Republic–Haiti relations Relations between Haiti and the Dominican Republic vacillated between barely tolerable and potentially combustible throughout the history of both countries' existences, reaching their lowest points in the Haitian invasion of the Dominican Republic, the aftermath of the Parsley Massacre, related Haitian-targeted ethnic cleansing campaigns by the Rafael Trujillo dictatorship and the 2010 earthquake in Port-au-Prince. The periodic influxes of Haitian economic (and, in times past, political) migrants across the border have also strained relations between the two countries at various recent times.: Dominican Republic has an embassy in Port-au-Prince and consulates-general in Anse-à-Pitres and Ouanaminthe and a consulate in Belladère.; Haiti has an embassy in Santo Domingo and consulates-general in Dajabón, Higüey, Santa Cruz de Barhona and Santiago de los Caballeros.
Guatemala	1948	Both countries established diplomatic relations in 1948.; See Haiti–Guatemala relations: Haiti has a diplomatic consulate in Guatemala City.; Guatemala has a diplomatic consulate in Port-au-Prince.
Jamaica	26 August 1981	Both countries established diplomatic relations on 26 August 1981 See Haiti–Jamaica relations: Haiti has an embassy in Kingston, but later closed in 2012.; Jamaica has an honorary consulate in Port-au-Prince.
Mexico	11 July 1929	Both countries established diplomatic relations on 11 July 1929 See Haiti–Mexico relations: Haiti has an embassy in Mexico City and a consulates-general in Tapachula and Tijuana.; Mexico has an embassy in Port-au-Prince.
United States	1 October 1862	Both countries established diplomatic relations on 1 October 1862 See Haiti–United States relations: Haiti has an embassy in Washington, D.C., and a consulates-general in Atlanta, Boston, Chicago, Miami, New York City and Orlando.; United States has an embassy in Port-au-Prince.
Venezuela	10 June 1864	See Haiti–Venezuela relations Both countries established diplomatic relations on 10 June 1864.: Haiti has an embassy in Caracas.; Venezuela has an embassy in Port-au-Prince.

=== Asia ===
Country	Formal relations began on	Notes
Bangladesh		See Bangladesh–Haiti relations The relations between the two countries have been largely influenced by the role of Bangladeshi peace keepers in Haiti.
China	No formal diplomatic relations	See China–Haiti relations Haiti does not have diplomatic relations with the People's Republic of China.: Haiti has a trade office in Beijing.; China has a trade office in Port-au-Prince.
India	27 September 1996	Both countries established diplomatic relations on 27 September 1996 See Haiti–India relations: Haiti maintains honorary consulates in New Delhi and Mumbai.; India has an honorary consulate in Port-au-Prince.
Israel	11 September 1958	Both countries established diplomatic relations on 11 September 1958 See Haiti–Israel relations Haiti recognized Israel's independence on 17 March 1949.: Israel is accredited to Haiti from its embassy in Panama City.
Taiwan	25 April 1956	Both countries established diplomatic relations on 25 April 1956 See Haiti–Taiwan relations: Haiti maintains an embassy in Taipei.; Taiwan maintains an embassy in Port-au-Prince.; Haitian President Jovenel Moise met with Taiwanese President Tsai Ing-Wen in Taipei since 2018.; Taiwan has offered US$150 million to Haiti for building up its rural power grid following its destruction in the 2010 earthquake.
Turkey	March 23, 1943	See Haiti–Turkey relations: Turkish Embassy in Santo Domingo is accredited to Haiti.; Trade volume between the two countries was US$129.7 million in 2019 (Haitian exports/imports: 0.8/128.9 million USD).; After the earthquake, Turkey provided financial aid and equipment worth US$124 million.; Since 2004, Turkey has provided personnel to MINUSTAH.

=== Europe ===
Country	Formal relations began on	Notes
France	12 February 1838	See France–Haiti relations: France has an embassy in Port-au-Prince.; Haiti has an embassy in Paris and a consulates-general in Cayenne, French Guiana and in Pointe-à-Pitre, Guadeloupe.
Germany		See Germany–Haiti relations: Haiti has an embassy in Berlin.; Germany has an embassy in Port-au-Prince.
Poland		See Haiti–Poland relations: Haiti is accredited to Poland from its embassy in Berlin, Germany.; Poland is accredited to Haiti from its embassy in Panama City, Panama, and there is an honorary consulate of Poland in Port-au-Prince.
Spain	20 December 1939	See Haiti–Spain relations Both countries established diplomatic relations on 20 December 1939 when first Chargé d'Affaires ad interim of Spain to Haiti (Resident in Ciudad Trujillo) Mr. Rafael de los Casares Moya presented his credentials.: Haiti has an embassy in Madrid.; Spain has an embassy in Port-au-Prince.
United Kingdom	13 May 1859	Both countries established diplomatic relations on 13 May 1859 when has been appointed first British Chargé d'Affaires and Consul General to Haiti Thomas Neville Ussher. See Haiti–United Kingdom relations: Haiti has an embassy in London and a consulates-general in Providenciales in Turks and Caicos Islands.; United Kingdom has an embassy in Port-au-Prince.

== Multilateral membership ==
- African, Caribbean and Pacific Group of States
- African Union (observer)
- Association of Caribbean States
- ALBA (observer)
- Caricom
- Central American Integration System (SICA) (observer)
- CELAC
- CCC
- Caribbean Development Bank
- United Nations Economic Commission for Latin America and the Caribbean
- Food and Agriculture Organization
- G-33
- G-77
- Ibero-American Summit (observer)
- Inter-American Development Bank
- International Atomic Energy Agency
- International Bank for Reconstruction and Development
- International Civil Aviation Organization
- International Red Cross and Red Crescent Movement
- International Fund for Agricultural Development
- International Finance Corporation
- International Federation of Red Cross and Red Crescent Societies
- International Labour Organization
- International Monetary Fund
- International Telecommunication Union
- Intelsat
- Interpol
- International Olympic Committee
- International Organization for Migration
- International Organization for Standardization
- International Telecommunication Union
- Latin American Economic System
- Non-Aligned Movement
- Organization of American States
- Organisation Internationale de la Francophonie, International Organisation of La Francophonie (OIF)
- OPANAL
- Organisation for the Prohibition of Chemical Weapons
- Rio Group
- United Nations
- United Nations Conference on Trade and Development
- UNESCO
- United Nations Industrial Development Organization
- Universal Postal Union
- World Health Organization
- World Intellectual Property Organization
- World Meteorological Organization
- World Tourism Organization
- World Trade Organization

== See also ==
- List of diplomatic missions in Haiti
- List of diplomatic missions of Haiti
- Visa requirements for Haitian citizens
