= Chile–Haiti relations =

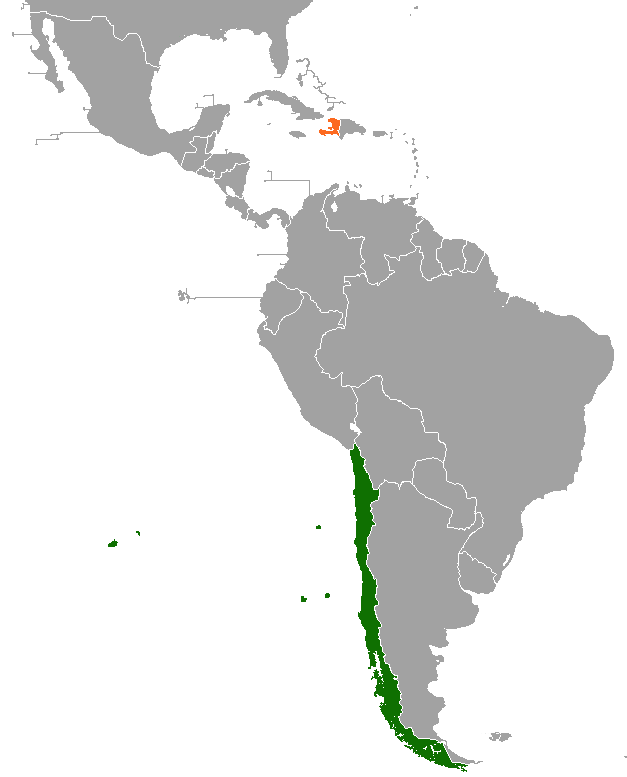

- Chile: Haiti

Chile–Haiti relations are the bilateral relations between Chile and Haiti. Both countries are members of Organization of American States.

== Visits ==
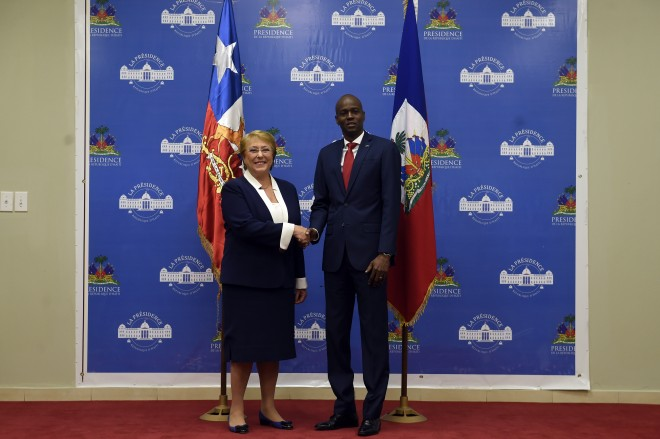
Chilean President Michelle Bachelet and Haitian President Jovenel Moïse in Port-au-Prince, 2017.

In March 2006, Haitian president-elect, René Préval, visited Chile to attend the inauguration ceremony for Chile's president Michelle Bachelet. In June 2006, President Bachelet visited Haitian President Preval. Bachelet pledged to "continue offering support so that every Haitian has a better chance to have health care, education and housing." Bachelet was the first head of state to visit Haiti since Preval took power in May. Bachelet said that she "would discuss with Preval the possibility of keeping Chilean forces in the country longer if needed, saying a stable Haiti was vital to regional security." In 2017, President Michelle Bachelet paid a visit to Haiti and met with President Jovenel Moïse.

== Political relations ==
In February 1973, Chile granted temporary residency to 15 Haitian political exiles involved in the kidnapping of the United States ambassador and consul in Port-au-Prince in January that year. In 1994, Chile together with Uruguay and Venezuela agreed to assist to make a peace deal. Haiti's military rulers endorsed the initiative.

In 1999, three Haitian parliamentarians requested political asylum in Chile. These parliamentarians took refuge at the Chilean embassy.

== Chilean assistance ==
As part of the response to the 2004 floods, Chilean troops were involved in a multinational force of 3,600 together with U.S. Marines, French, and Canadian troops.

Chilean search and rescue experts were involved in recovery efforts for the 2010 Haiti earthquake. Chilean Army Major Rodrigo Vázquez directed rescue efforts for the earthquake.

== Chilean troops in Haiti ==
Chilean Brigadier General Eduardo Aldunate Herman was the vice commander of the United Nations peacekeeping mission in Haiti. Chile sent 650 peacekeeping troops to the island as part of the United Nations peace keeping mission. Praising the work of the Chilean policemen in Haiti, National Police official Javiera Blanco said, "Even though today there is a need for the key presence of this mission, which is in mid term, the exit should be prepared for, considering that the country (Haiti) must take those responsibilities and build their capacities to do what is done by our mission." The police are planned to withdraw from Haiti in 2011.

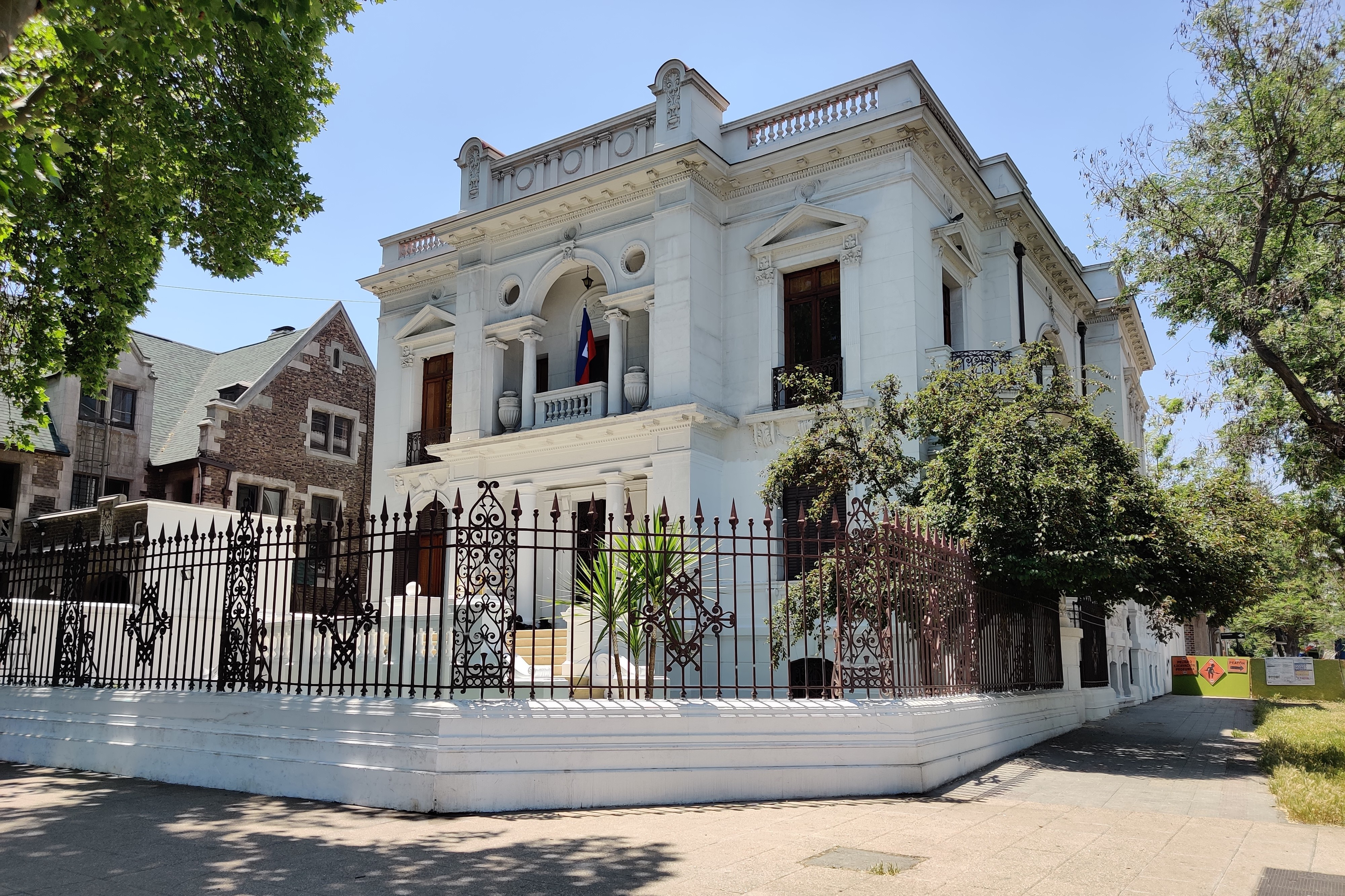
Embassy of Haiti in Santiago

== Resident diplomatic missions ==
- Chile has an embassy in Port-au-Prince.
- Haiti has an embassy in Santiago.

== See also ==
- Foreign relations of Chile
- Foreign relations of Haiti
