= The Bahamas–Haiti relations =

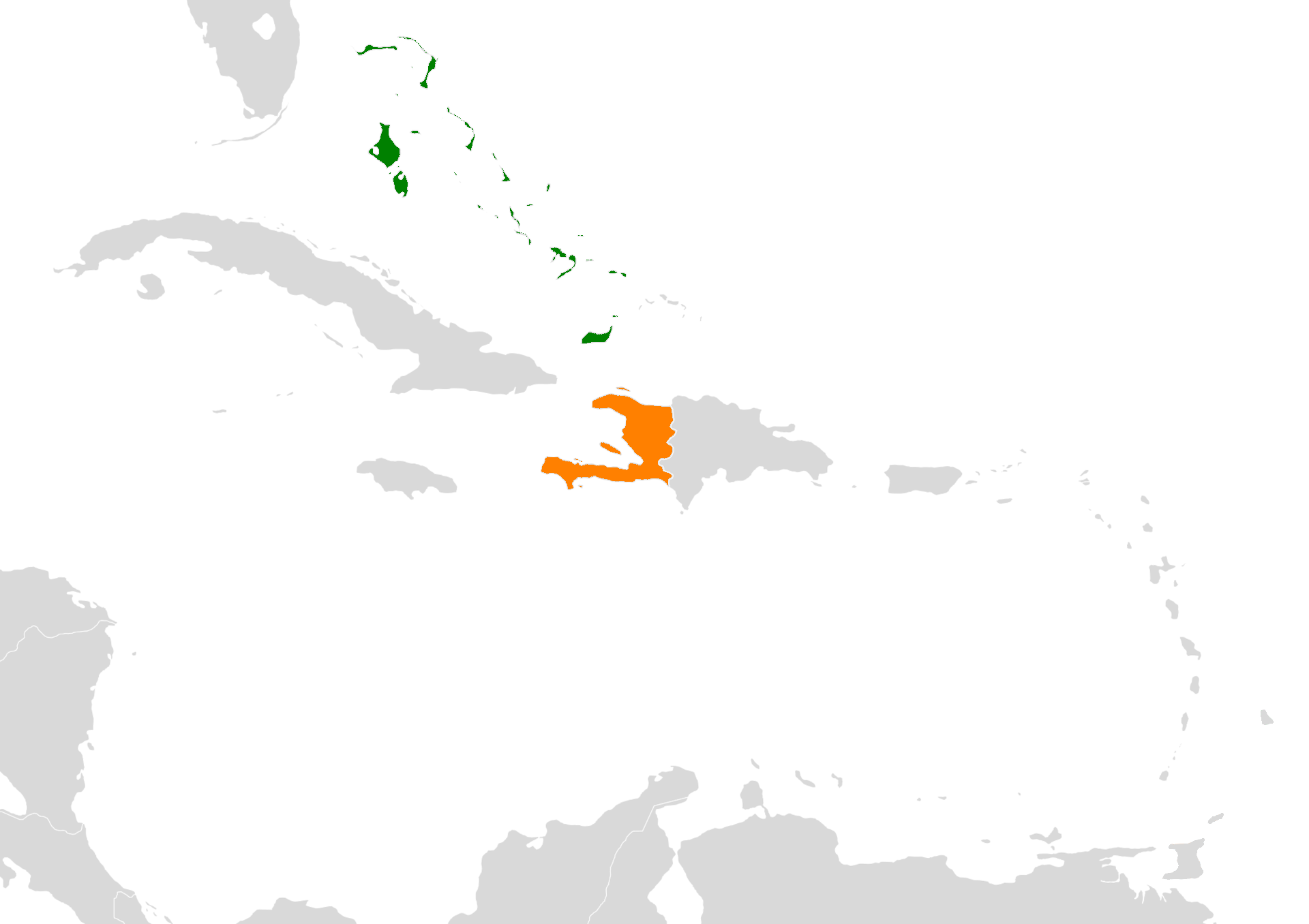

- Bahamas: Haiti

Diplomatic relations exist between The Bahamas and the Republic of Haiti. The Bahamas does not have an embassy in Haiti. Haiti maintains an embassy in Nassau.

== History ==
Bilateral ties started in the 20th century when Haiti sent its first consul to The Bahamas and have since shared a close and strong bond due to similar demographics and history. In 2013, Antonio Rodrique represented Haiti as the Ambassador to The Bahamas. Both nations are a part of Caribbean Community (CARICOM), with The Bahamas joining in 1983 and Haiti joining in 2002.

== Trade ==
In 2014, the Agriculture Minister of The Bahamas, Renward Wells, visited Haiti to discuss marketing Haitian food products in the country along with visiting several universities, banana farms and mango farms. The minister discussed Haitian food products meeting international standards for exporting with Haitian officials. In 2018, Haitian President Jovenel Moïse and Bahamian Prime Minister Hubert Minnis met in Port-au-Prince to discuss several issues involving trade, illegal immigration from Haiti, agriculture and further relations. A trade deal was formed at the meeting, allowing Nassau to buy fruits and vegetables from Haiti in exchange for reducing illegal immigration.

== Illegal immigration ==
Relations have strained under increased illegal immigration from Haiti to The Bahamas. Thousands of Haitians flee Haiti for The Bahamas using makeshift rafts creating safety concerns for The Bahamas. Haiti has discussed plans to establish a center for documenting and deporting illegal Haitians at their embassy in Nassau. It is estimated that there are 80,000 Haitians in The Bahamas, a nation of only 350,000 people. Many Haitians on the island work in menial jobs such as gardening, construction work and other labor-intensive jobs.

== See also ==
- Foreign relations of The Bahamas
- Foreign relations of Haiti
