= Haiti–Kenya relations =

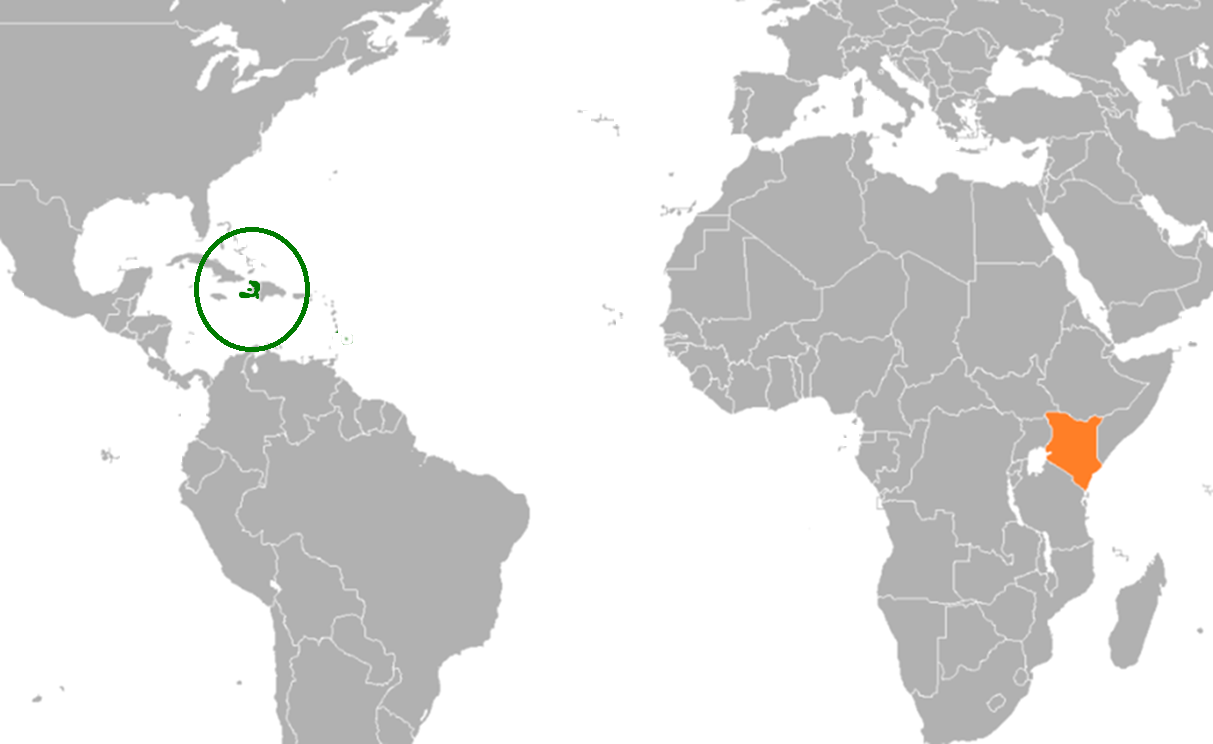

- Haiti: Kenya

Haiti–Kenya relations refers to the bilateral relations between Haiti and Kenya. Both nations are members of the Group of 77, Non-Aligned Movement and the United Nations.

== History ==
On 20 September 2023, Haiti and Kenya formally established diplomatic relations.

In response to citizen protests and gang warfare during the Haitian conflict and the assassation of then-prime minister Jovenel Moïse, Haiti requested international assistance from the United Nations in 2022, which was approved a year later after the adoption of UNSC Resolution 2699 on 2 October 2023. Kenya was tasked by the United States with leading a multinational policing mission made up of several other African and Caribbean forces called the Multinational Security Support Mission.

In February 2024, Haitian prime minister Ariel Henry flew to Guyana and Kenya to approve the deployment of 1,000 Kenyan policemen in the country. However, he could not return to Haiti after gangs attacked the Toussaint Louverture International Airport and he resigned from his position two months later.

On 25 June 2024, 400 Kenyan police officers landed in Port-au-Prince after months of delay, with 200 more arriving a month later. On 21 September 2024, Kenyan President William Ruto visited Haiti to meet with Kenyan troops and pledged to send an additional 600 officers. Since then, the mission has been criticized for its lack of progress in fighting criminal gangs and little signs of improving the Haitian situation.

In April 2025, the Cabinet of Kenya approved the establishment of a Consulate-General in Port-au-Prince. In July, former deputy inspector general of the Administration Police, Noor Gabow, was appointed to be the first Consul-General.

== Diplomatic missions ==
- Haiti is accredited to Kenya from its embassy in Pretoria, South Africa.
- Kenya is accredited to Haiti from its embassy in Havana, Cuba and maintains a consulate-general in Port-au-Prince.

== See also ==
- Foreign relations of Haiti
- Foreign relations of Kenya
