= Colombia–Haiti relations =

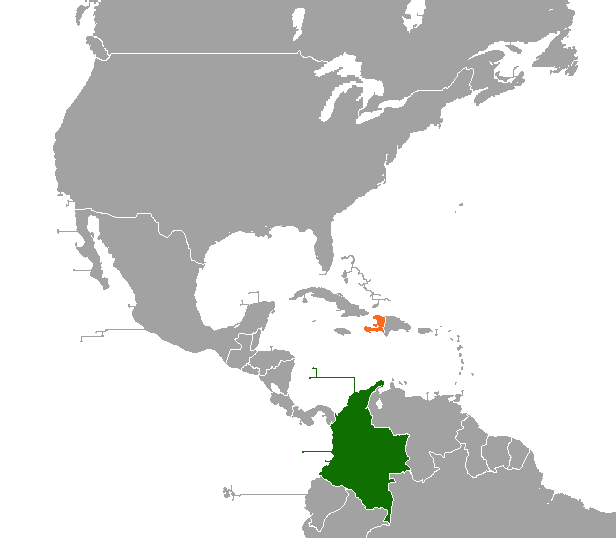

- Colombia: Haiti

Diplomatic mission
- Embassy of Colombia in Port-au-Prince: Embassy of Haiti in Colombia

Envoy
- Ambassador Vilma Velásquez Uribe: Ambassador Lesly David

Colombia–Haiti relations are the bilateral relations between the Republic of Colombia and the Republic of Haiti. Both countries have maintained a friendly relationship since the time of Colombia's independence in 1820. The two nations are members of the Organization of American States, Association of Caribbean States, Community of Latin American and Caribbean States and the United Nations.

== History ==
Colombia and Haiti established diplomatic relations in 1820, and Haiti provided support in the Colombian War of Independence, serving as inspiration and refuge to Simón Bolívar and even providing him with 7 ships, 4,000 rifles with bayonets, 15,000 pounds of gunpowder, 15,000 pounds of lead, rifle flints, provisions, cash, and 3,500 men. Simon Bolivar said about Haiti:

Having lost Venezuela and New Granada, the island of Haiti welcomed me with hospitality: the magnanimous President Pétion lent me his protection and under his auspices I formed an expedition of three hundred men comparable in courage, patriotism and virtue to the companions of Leonidas. Thanks to the people of Haiti my compatriots will be free again.

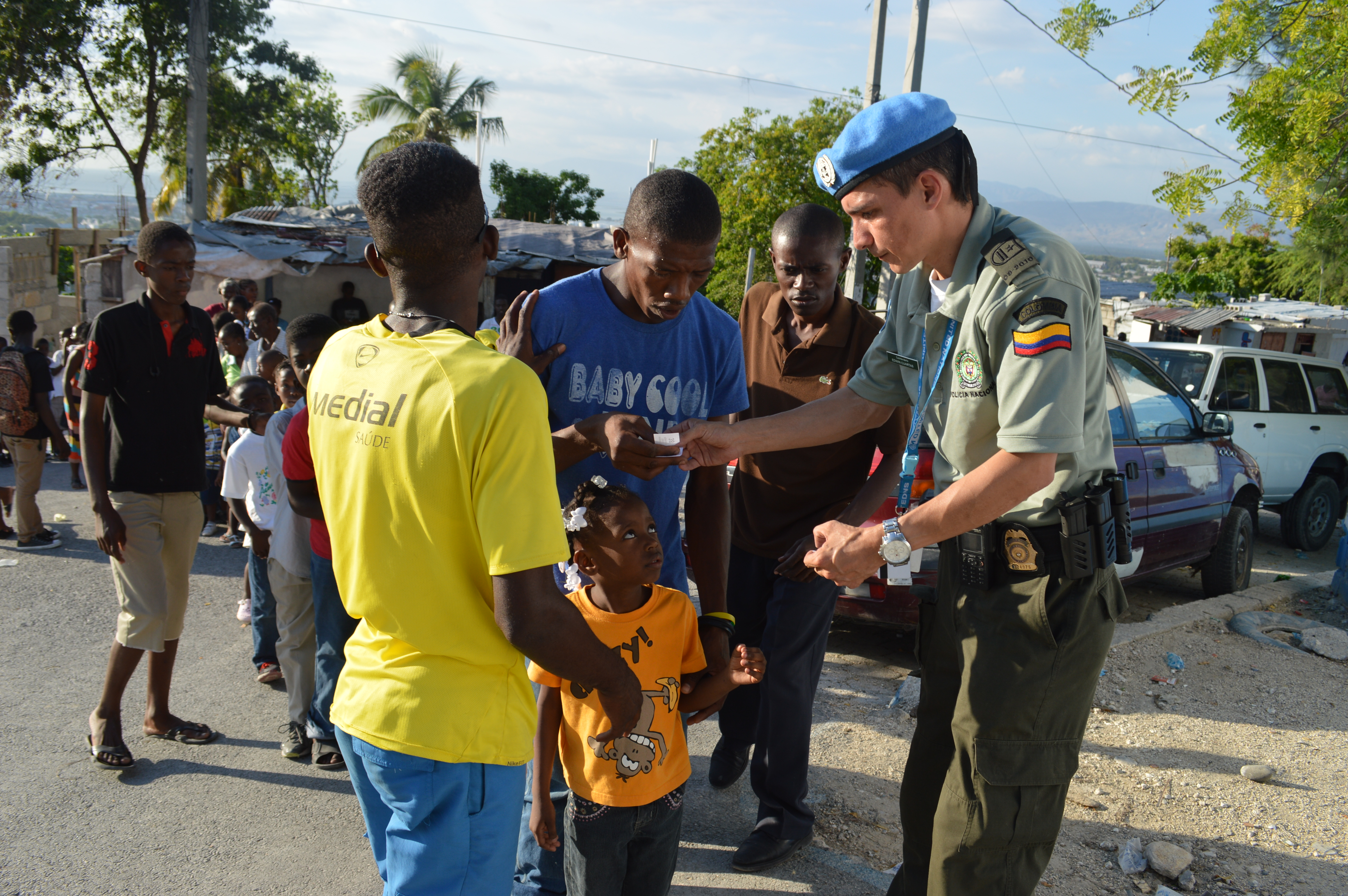
Colombian Police officer in Haiti

Prior to the 2010 Haiti earthquake, Colombia played a role in several projects and had police presence in the MINUSTAH (the United Nations Stabilisation Mission in Haiti). Following the aftermath of the earthquake, Colombia has sent important amounts of humanitarian aid, ships, experts and infrastructure to Haiti to assist with reconstruction. In 2024, Colombian president Gustavo Petro was expected to visit Haiti, but was unable to visit the country due to the security situation. On April of that year, Consul General of Colombia, Vilma Velásquez met with ten Haitian entrepreneurs who expressed in exploring the Colombia market for trade purposes.

On July 18, 2025, President Gustavo Petro travelled to Haiti to reopen the Colombian Embassy in Haiti. Mrs. Velásquez was then promoted to the post of Ambassador.

== Border ==
The border between Colombia and Haiti is an international maritime limit that runs along the Caribbean Sea, is defined by the Liévano-Brutus Treaty, signed on February 17, 1978 in Port-au-Prince by the Minister of Foreign Affairs of Colombia, Indalecio Liévano Aguirre, and the Secretary of State for Foreign Affairs and Cults of Haiti, Edner Brutus, and approved by the Congress of the Republic of Colombia by Law No. 12.

The border between the two countries is defined by the principle of the median line, whose points are equidistant from the nearest baselines, from which the width of the territorial sea of each state is measured. It consists of a single straight line that runs between the coordinate points 14°44′10″N 74°30′50″W and 15°02′00″N 73°27′30″W.

== Defense and security ==
As part of the Colombia-Haiti Binational Ministers Council, Haitian defense minister Jean-Michel Moïse met with his Colombian counterpart, Iván Velásquez Gómez, in Bogotá then in Riohacha, to discuss bilateral defense cooperation. They also discussed military cooperation to face mutual security challenges (particularly transnational crimes, drug trafficking and other contraband). Moïse stated that Colombia had manifested its will to assist Haiti, in the short and long term, in reinforcing and developing the Armed Forces of Haiti. In an interview to Gazette Haiti, TPC coordinator Leslie Voltaire informed that the Colombian government (led by President Gustavo Petro) had invited the Haitian government to make their military and security acquisitions (small arms, armored vehicles, boats, etc.) in Colombia. He also mentioned their openness to train Haitian policemen (on community policing and counter-intelligence) and servicemembers on Colombian soil. President Petro invited Brazil, Chile, Peru, and Mexico to join this cooperation bloc.

On December 16, 2024, Lieutenant General Derby Guerrier visited the HQ of the Military Forces of Colombia in Bogotá and the Colombian Navy shipyard in Cartagena to observe the functioning of the Colombian armed forces and shipbuilding operations. On January 22, 2025, the second part of the Binational Ministers' council took part in Jacmel, Haiti. This time a defense and security Memorandum of understanding was signed by both countries' defense ministers, formally establishing military cooperation and defense/security partnership between Colombia and Haiti. On a Facebook post, President Petro announced that Haitian military and police personnel would be receiving training in Colombia.

Haitian Ambassador to Colombia, Mr. Lesly David, met with newly appointed Colombian Defense Minister, Colombian Air Force General (ret.) Pedro Sanchez, to discuss strengthening of defense partnership, development of strategies to counter transnational crimes. Gen. Sanchez also stated the ministry's willingness to make the capabilities of the Social and Business Group of the Defense Sector (Grupo Social y Empresarial del Sector Defensa, GSED) available to Haiti.

Petro would return to Haiti on July 18, 2025, this time with Defense minister Pedro Arnulfo Sánchez. Minister Sanchez met with Minister Moise, Justice Minister Pélissier, the High Staff of the Armed Forces and the Direction of the National Police. This meeting was deemed the conclusion of negotiations, with great results for Haiti. Petro would announce on his X account "We will train Haiti's army and police to rebuild their state and the Nation of Freedom." Colombia and the Military Forces of Colombia will take charge of training 1000 Haitian recruits, similar to the arrangement between Haiti and Mexico. 500 will be trained by the National Army of Colombia, 250 by the Colombian Navy, and 250 by the Colombian Aerospace Force. They will also train agents of the Haitian National Police in domains of investigation, intelligence, and community policing. All training will be done on Colombian soil. The cost of this training will be covered mostly by Colombia, via the Agencia de la Presidencia para la Cooperación Internacional. International partners line the United States, France, the United Kingdom, the Netherlands, and the Dominican Republic, may also contribute to this project. The training is anticipated to cost USD $2.5 million.

The Haitian government is in talks with Colombian weapons manufacturer INDUMIL, confirmed by Colombian Defense minister Pedro Arnulfo Sánchez.

== High-level visits ==
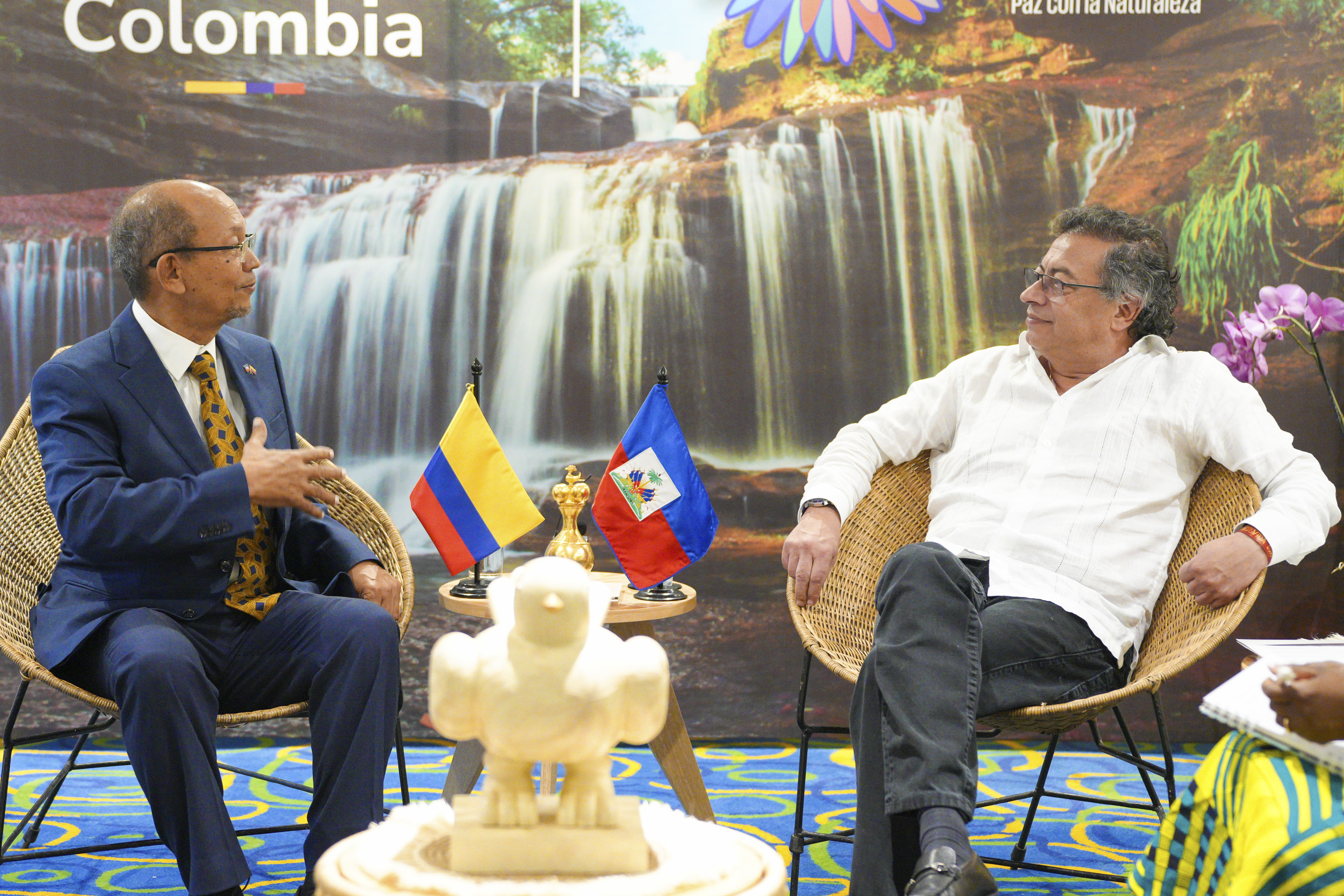
President Petro hosting the President of the CPT Voltaire at COP16

High-level visits from Haiti to Colombia

- Foreign Minister Bocchit Edmond (2019)
- Transitional Presidential Council coordinator Leslie Voltaire (2024)
  - Defense Minister Jean-Michel Moïse (2024)
  - Justice and Public Safety Minister Patrick Pélissier (2024)
  - Foreign Minister Jean Victor Harvel Jean Baptiste (2024)
  - Economy and Finance Minister Alfred Metellus (2024)
  - Planning and External Cooperation Minister Ketleen Forestal (2024)
  - Agriculture, Natural Resources, and Rural Development Minister Vernet Joseph (2024)
  - Commerce and Industry Minister James Monazard (2024)
  - Education Minister Antoine Augustin (2024)
  - Public Work, Transport and Communications Minister Raphaël Hosty (2024)
  - Social Affair and Labor Minister Georges Wilbert Franck (2024)
- Commander-in-Chief of the Armed Forces of Haiti (FAD'H) Lieutenant-General Derby Guerrier (2024)
- General Director of the Haitian National Police (PNH) Normil Rameau (2024)

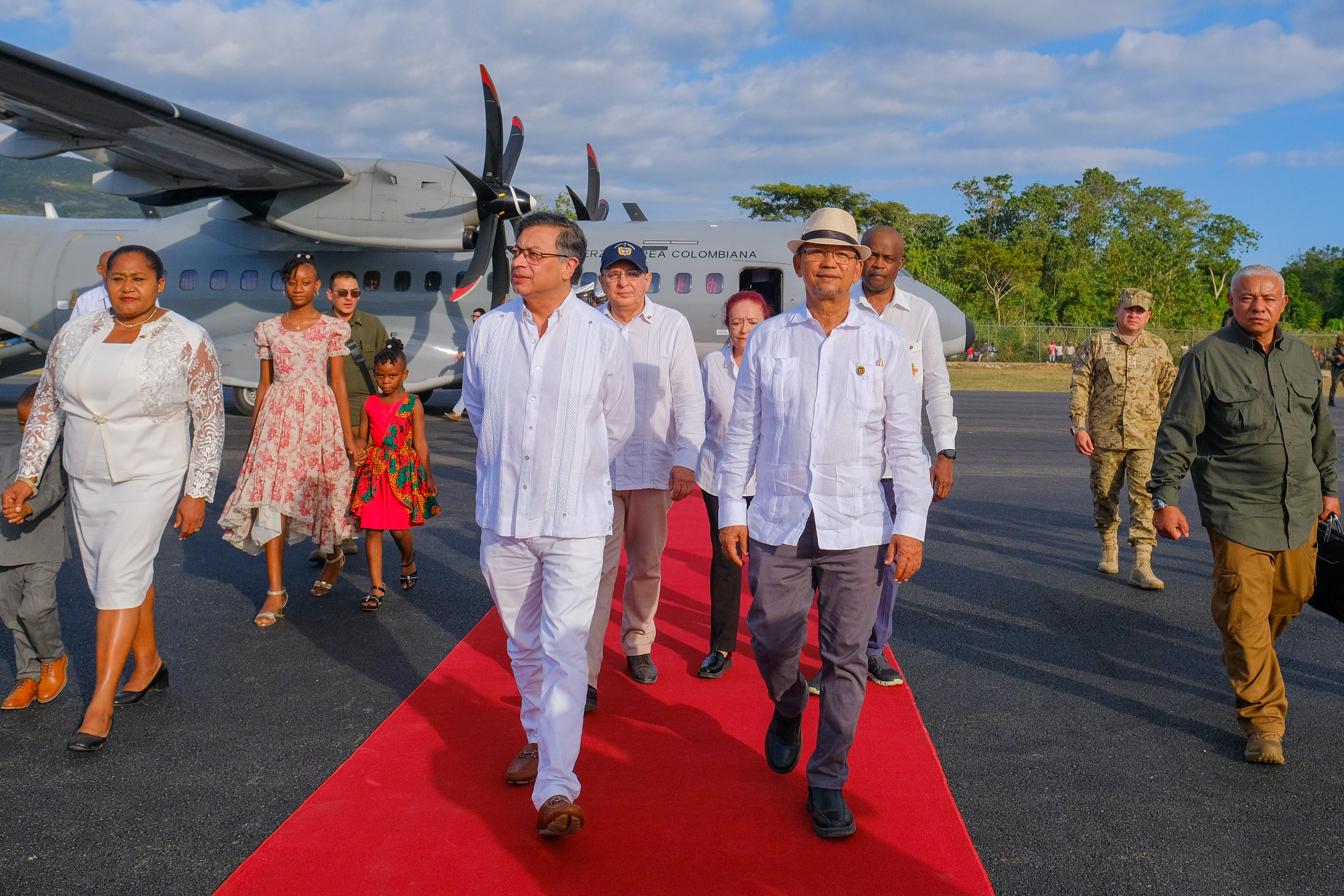

High-level visits from Colombia to Haiti

- Foreign Minister Álvaro Leyva (2023)
- President Gustavo Petro (2025)
  - Defense Minister Iván Velásquez Gómez (January 2025)
  - Defense Minister Pedro Arnulfo Sánchez (July 2025)
  - Agriculture and Rural Development Minister Martha Viviana Carvajalino Villegas (2025)
  - Environment Minister María Susana Muhamad González (2025)
  - Culture and Art Minister Juan David Correa Ulloa (2025)
  - Minister of Commerce, Industry and Tourism Luis Carlos Reyes Hernández (2025)

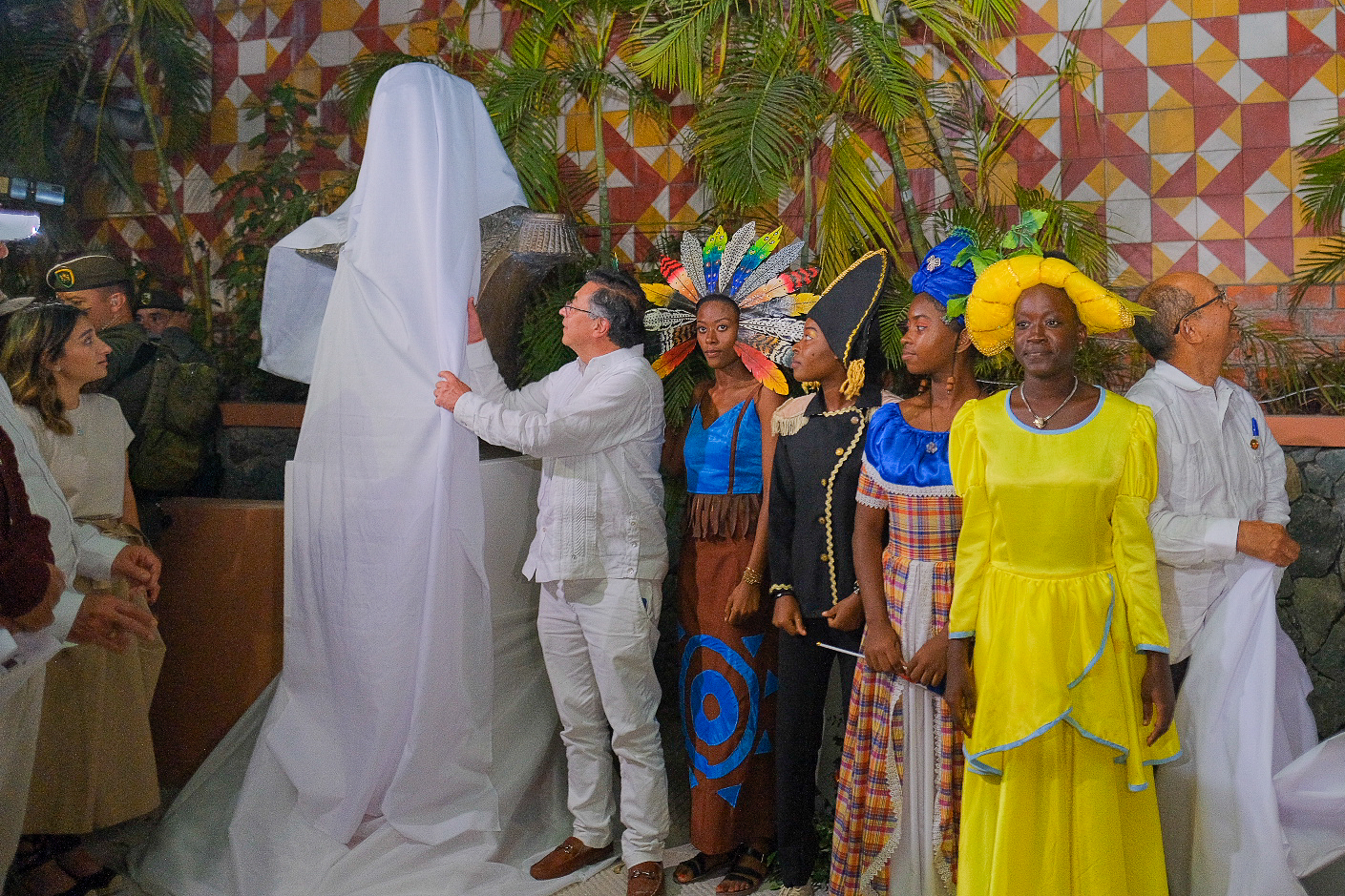

== Trade ==
Colombia exported products worth 9,133 thousand dollars, the main exported products being sugar, agro-industrial products and plastics, while Colombia exported products worth 45 thousand dollars, the main products being cosmetics.

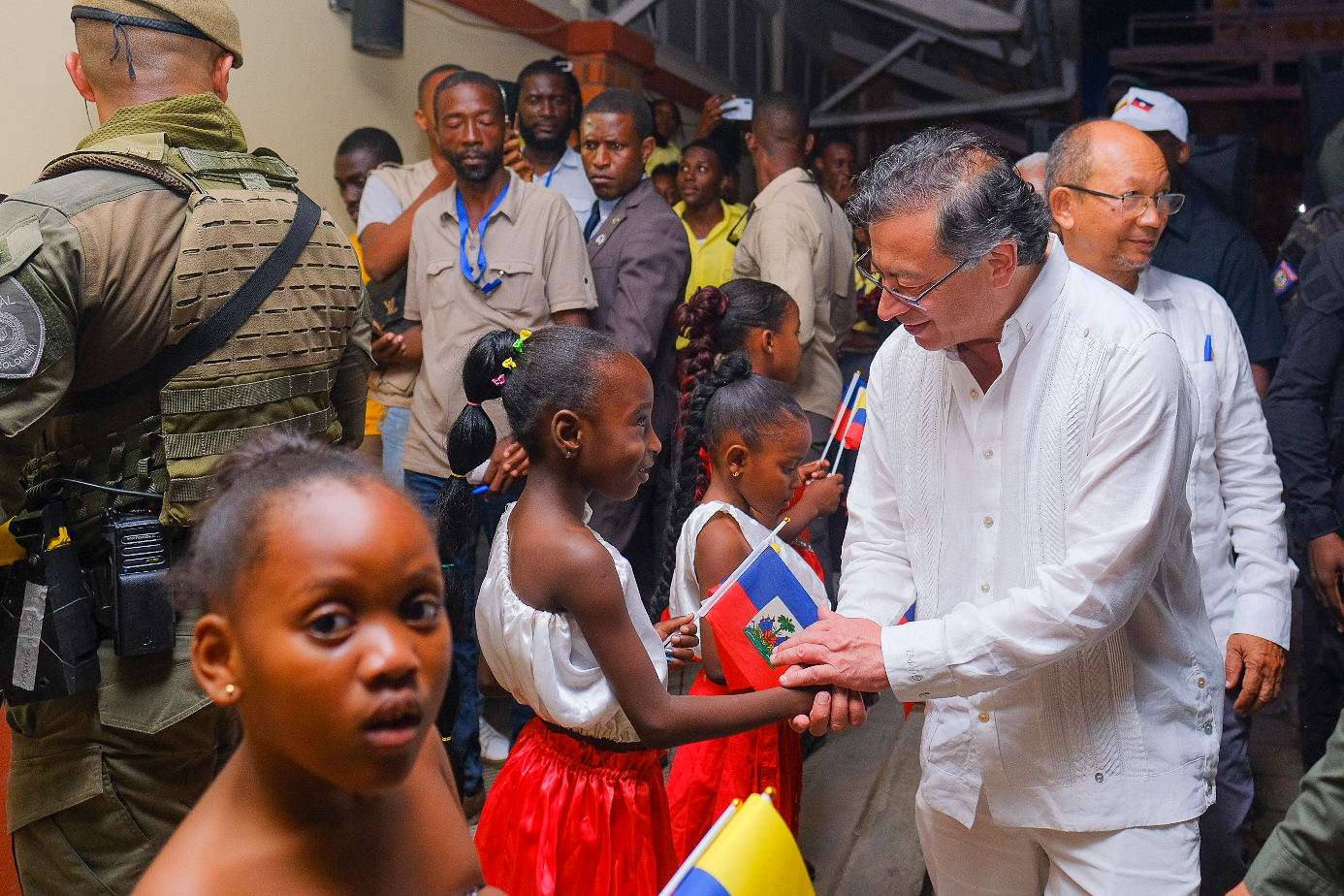

In 2022, Haiti exported $376k to Colombia. The products exported from Haiti to Colombia consisted of knit men's undergarments ($81k), knit t-shirts ($66.8k), and essential oils ($60k). Colombia exported $52.5M to Haiti. The products exported from Colombia to Haiti included raw sugar ($29.2M), baked goods ($7.15M), and palm oil ($3.84M).

== Resident diplomatic missions ==
- Colombia uses its embassy in Santo Domingo as a concurrent embassy in Haiti. The Colombian consulate in Port-au-Prince was re-opened on December 15, 2023
- Haiti has an embassy in Bogotá.

== See also ==
- Foreign relations of Colombia
- Foreign relations of Haiti
