= History of the Jews in Haiti =

The history of the Jews in Haiti (French: Juifs en Haïti; Haitian Creole: Jwif Ayisyen yo) stretches from the beginning of the European settlement until the modern day.

As of 2013, the Jewish population was around 25, predominantly in the capital of Port-au-Prince.

== History ==
=== The first Jewish settlement ===
In 1492, the first Jew in Haiti was Luis de Torres, an interpreter for Christopher Columbus. After Haiti was taken over and colonized by the French in 1633, many Dutch Jews (of whom many were Marrano) emigrated from Brazil in 1634 and became employees of the French sugar plantations and further developed the trade. In 1683, the Jews were expelled from Haiti and all other French colonies, due to the Code Noir (Black Code), which both restricted the activities of free Negroes and forbade the exercise of any religion other than Roman Catholicism. However, despite the Code Noir, a limited number of Jews remained in French trading companies as leading officials, including foreign citizens (Dutch Jews, Danish Jews, and English Jews) or holders of special residence permits (lettres patentes). These Jews tended to specialize in agricultural plantations, with Portuguese Jews from Bordeaux and Bayonne settling mainly in the southern part of Haiti (Jacmel, Jérémie, Léogâne, Les Cayes, Petit-Goâve, and Port-au-Prince) and Curaçaoan Jews settling in the northern part (Cap-Haitien and Saint Louis).

In the mid-1700s, many Jews returned to Haiti.

Due to a lack of Jewish community centers, many youth did not grow up with a Jewish education and had to hide their Judaism, as only Catholics were permitted to attend public school. Jews generally preferred to settle on the coastline in port cities, as many were involved in commerce and trade, establishing communities in major industry centers. Recently, archaeologists uncovered an ancient synagogue of Crypto-Jews in the city of Jérémie, the only one found on the island; Jérémie was inhabited by many mixed-race families of Jewish descent. Several Jewish tombstones have also been found in port cities such as Cap-Haïtien and Jacmel. By the end of the 19th century, approximately thirty mostly Sephardi Jewish families had arrived from Lebanon, Syria, and Egypt; many Jews from the Middle East felt secure emigrating to Haiti, as a law in France had been passed during this period that gave French citizenship to minorities in the Americas.

== Modern times ==
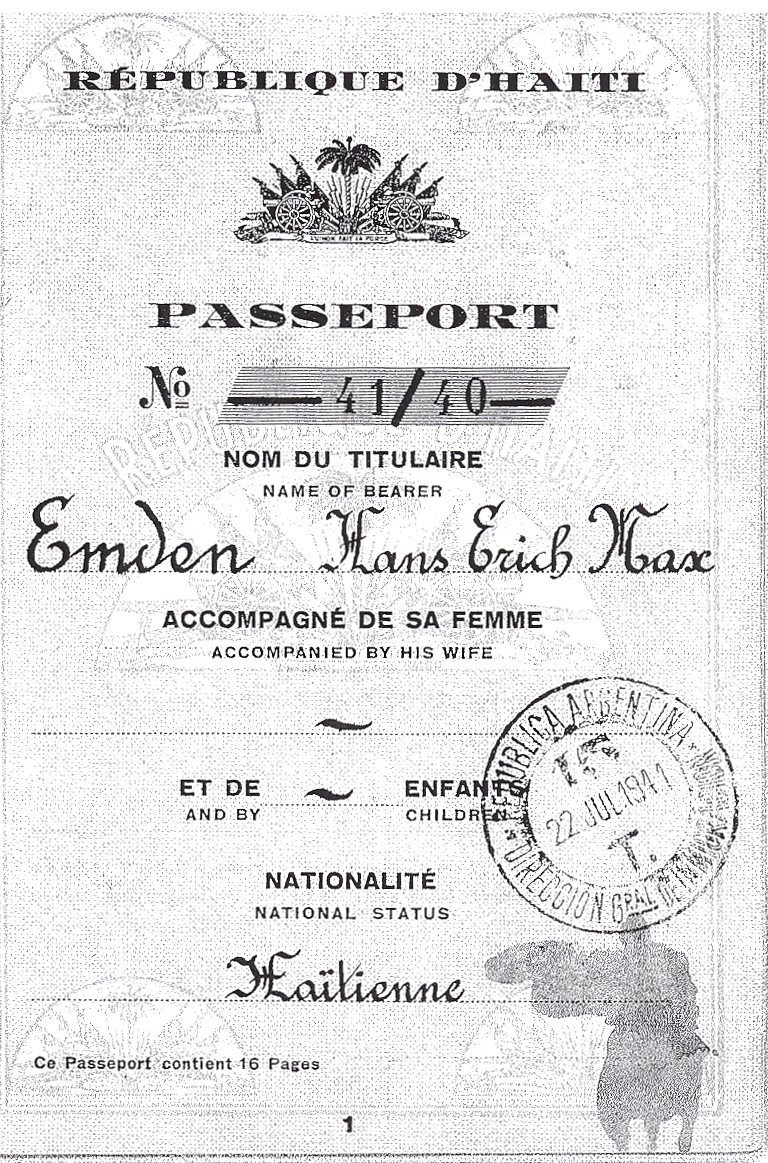
Passport issued to Hans Erich Max Emden by the Haitian government, who managed to escape the Holocaust. In 1941 he used it to travel to Argentina.

In 1915, during the United States occupation of Haiti, roughly 200 Jews lived in Haiti at the time. During the 20 years period of occupation, many Jews left Haiti for the United States and South America. In 1937, Haiti was responsible for saving about 70 Jewish families (an estimated total of up to 300 lives) during the Holocaust (according to the American Jewish Joint Distribution Committee), by issuing passports and visas to Jews escaping Nazi persecution. Some were Austrian Jews, Polish Jews, German Jews, and a trickle of Romanian Jew and Czech Jewish descent. Haiti played a small, yet critical role in saving Jewish lives during the darkest chapter in the Jewish story. However, many Jews were unable to acquire visas to Haiti due to the cost. Professor David Bankier, of the Institute of Contemporary Jewry at the Hebrew University of Jerusalem, said that after 1938, "the cost [of a visa] was outrageous: If you wanted to go to Haiti, you had to pay $5,000." Haiti at the time was still paying reparations on an exorbitant debt with interest fees to France after the Haitian Revolution that could have hindered their efforts to continue issuing these visas for free. There were others apart from this bunch who never came to Haiti at all, but from Germany they were given Haitian passports by the Haitian government that allowed them to flee Germany and into other countries. Grateful to the Haitian government, many of these European Jews stayed in Haiti until the late 1950s in which many Haitian Jews left, so that their children could marry other Jews and not assimilate, while finding better economic opportunities. The 1957 Jewish population of Haiti was about 200. The mid-20th century was a time of a continued departure of Jews from Haiti for the United States and Panama because of the economic conditions and civil violence in the country.

=== Judaism ===
Today, the Jewish community is led by Rabbi Douglas Lapin, a local businessman. The Jewish community is known as the "Consistoire d'Haiti" and has been recognized as the representative of the Jewish community by the Haitian Ministry of Religion (Ministere des Cultes) <Rep. d'Haiti; Ministere des Cultes DG/909 6 fevrier 2017>. Rabbi Lapin has likewise been recognized as the Rabbi in Haiti by the Haitian government<Tribunal de Premiere Instance de Port-au-Prince; Recipisse No. 3710084007-7; 4 Octobre 2017>. The community is very small and mostly consists of UN, NGO, and diplomatic personnel, although there are a small number of Haitian Jewish families. The community does Kosher chicken slaughtering (shechita) and has occasional gatherings for Jewish festivals such as Sukkot and Purim. There is also an Etrog, Myrtle (Hadass) and Willow (Aravah) plantation to supply local needs for Sukkot. The community is working on developing a synagogue and community center. There is a complete library of Jewish liturgical books (Sifrei Kodesh), as well as a handwritten Sefer Torah and Book of Esther.

=== Business ===
The 1960s was a time of wealth and high hopes of large future development for Haiti. At the time met many family Jewish names such as: Alvarez, Cardozo, Cohen, Dreyfus, Goldman, Hakim, Hillel, Khan, Monsanto, Pereira, Salzmann, Silveira, and Weiner, which most had forgotten their ethno-religious backgrounds. Today, less than a hundred Jews remain in Haiti of its 9.5 million inhabitants; however, the Weiners (coffee exporters) and the Salzmanns (refugees from Austria) are still today relevant in trade.

== Notable Haitian Jews ==
- Eric André – actor, comedian and television host
- Gilbert Bigio – businessman and billionaire of Syrian Jewish descent and Israeli honorary consul in Haiti
- Luis de Torres – one of the first Jews to settle on Haiti, and also Christopher Columbus's interpreter
- Rachmani Rosh Domersant – philanthropist, businessman, university professor
- Monique Péan – fine jewelry designer
- Sol – musician of Russian Jewish descent

== See also ==
- Haiti-Israel relations
