= Haiti–Venezuela relations =

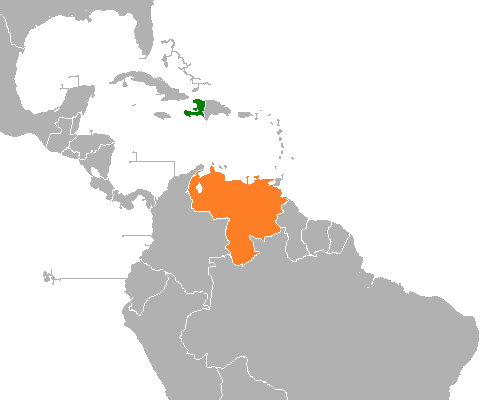

- Haiti: Venezuela

Envoy
- Ambassador Jean Mary Vaval: . .

Haiti–Venezuela relations are relations between Haiti and Venezuela. Venezuela has an embassy in Port-au-Prince, and Haiti has an embassy in Caracas.

For Haiti, relations with Venezuela, along with other Latin American nations, was poor for nearly 200 years. During the administration of Venezuelan president Hugo Chávez, Venezuela utilized "oil diplomacy" to increase influence in the region, with Haiti supporting Venezuelan foreign policy after receiving petroleum benefits. Once the crisis in Venezuela began to affect Venezuela's ability to continue petroleum programs, Haiti faced economic and energy difficulties. After facing these difficulties, Haiti withdrew its support from Venezuelan leader Nicolás Maduro, Chávez's handpicked successor, choosing to recognize Juan Guaidó as president of Venezuela during the 2019 Venezuelan presidential crisis.

== History ==
=== 19th century ===
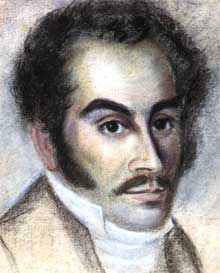
Simón Bolívar in Haiti, 1816

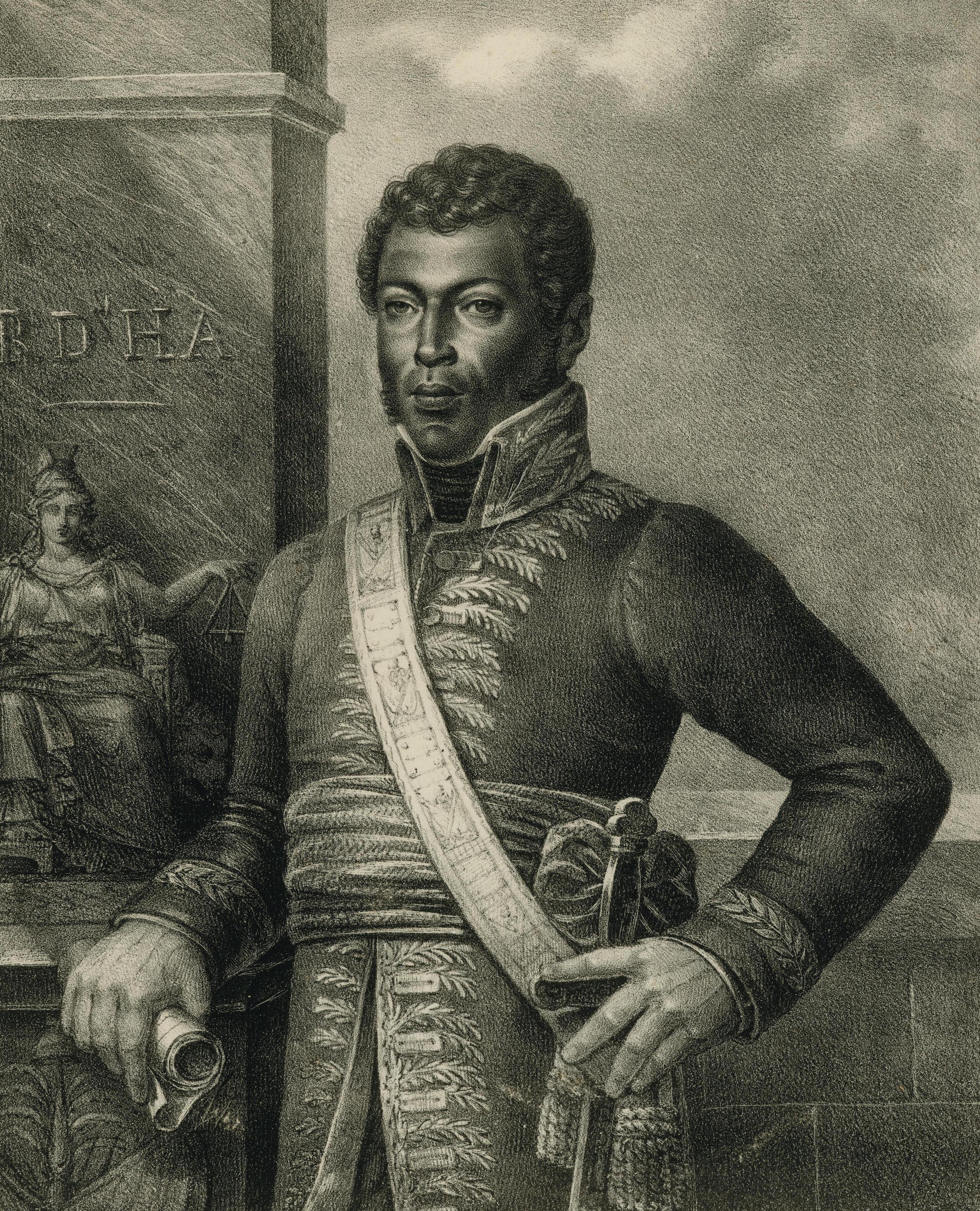
Haitian president Alexandre Pétion

Haiti supported Simón Bolívar during the Latin American wars of independence and harbored his forces. When Bolívar fled the Second Republic of Venezuela following its fall in 1815, he became close to Alexandre Pétion, the first president of Haiti, and received aid.

Bolívar returned to Venezuela in 1816 with the support of Haitian soldiers and equipment. Pétion demanded that Bolívar free Spanish America's slaves, with Bolívar accomplishing this on 2 June 1816. Despite the relations between the two presidents, the two countries would not establish diplomatic relations until 10 June 1864, with Venezuela becoming the fourth country overall (and first South American country) to recognize Haiti, and Haiti becoming the 17th country to recognize Venezuela.

=== 20th century ===
Venezuela broke off diplomatic relations with Haiti (along with a number of other Latin American countries) in 1963, applying Rómulo Betancourt's "Betancourt doctrine" of avoiding relationships with dictatorships due to the actions of Haitian President François Duvalier.

Following the 1991 Haitian coup d'état, Venezuelan President Carlos Andrés Pérez sent an airplane for ousted Haitian President Jean-Bertrand Aristide. During the coup, diplomats from France, Venezuela and the United States were instrumental in preserving Aristide's life. Despite showing support for Aristide, the Venezuelan government rejected Haitian refugees during the crisis.

=== 21st century ===
Haiti became a member of Petrocaribe in 2006, an agreement allowing Caribbean nations to buy Venezuelan oil on conditions of preferential payment. After joining Petrocaribe, Haiti followed Venezuela's opinion in foreign policy assemblies–often opposing United States policies–and began to rely on Venezuela's cheap petroleum prices for economic development.

Following the 2010 Haiti earthquake, Venezuela made substantial contributions to the humanitarian response to the earthquake, pledging $1.3bn in aid in addition to cancelling $395m in Petrocaribe debt. Projects included the construction of three power plants, which provided a fifth of Haiti's electricity in December 2011. In December 2011 Haitian President Michel Martelly said that "The cooperation with Venezuela is the most important in Haiti right now in terms of impact, direct impact." Haiti became a "permanent observer" of the Bolivarian Alliance for the Americas (ALBA) in February 2012, the regional group launched and led by Venezuela. At the February 2012 ALBA summit, "President Hugo Chávez and Haitian President Michel Martelly signed a framework agreement that aims to boost Venezuela’s role in Haitian agriculture, manufacturing and tourism, among other sectors."

As the crisis in Venezuela intensified under Chávez's successor Nicolás Maduro, Venezuela began to stop shipping petroleum products to Haiti. This resulted with energy shortages and economic difficulties in Haiti after the nation's government ran out of funds for oil purchases after turning to international oil sales set at market rate prices. By 2018, inflation began to increase while economic growth decreased in Haiti as a result of losing Venezuelan aid. Into 2019, the government of Haitian president Jovenel Moïse recognized leader of the Venezuelan National Assembly Juan Guaidó as president of Venezuela, turning away from Maduro, a traditional ally. As unrest in Venezuela continued, the Moïse government, beside ten other nations, approved of Guaidó's potential induction into the Inter-American Treaty of Reciprocal Assistance and using the treaty to manage the crisis in Venezuela.

== See also ==
- Foreign relations of Haiti
- Foreign relations of Venezuela
