= Bangladesh–Haiti relations =

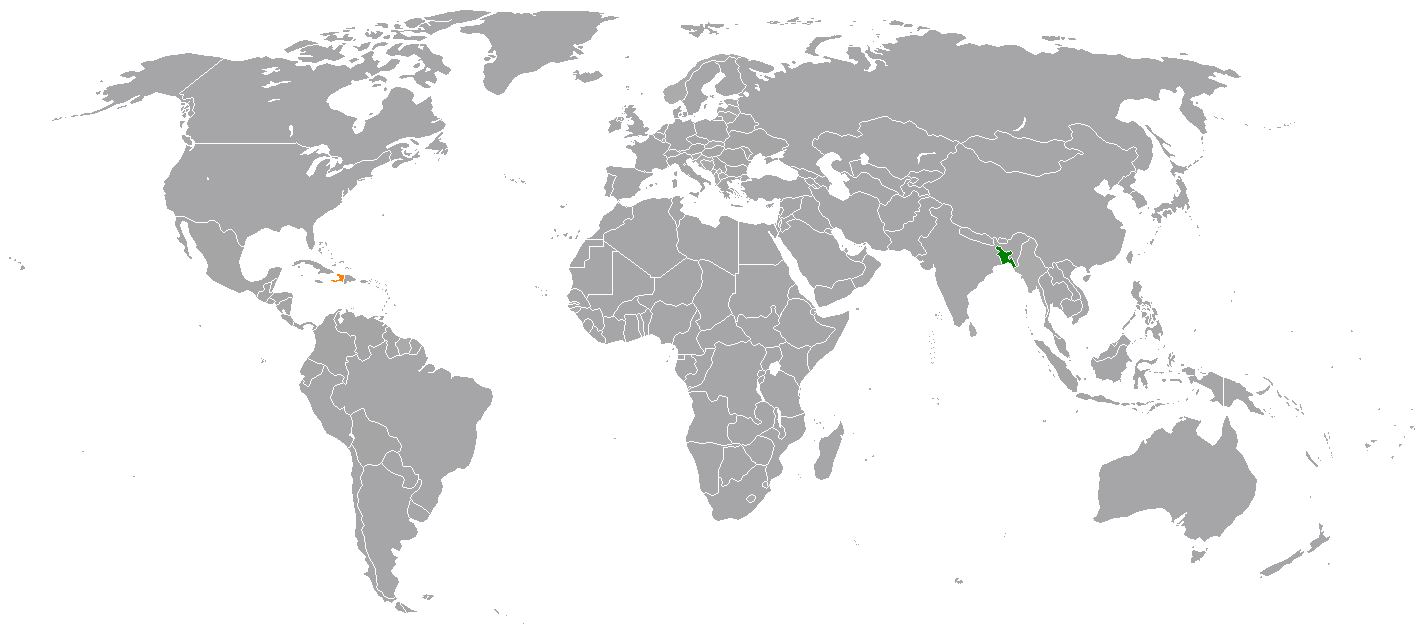

- Bangladesh: Haiti

Bangladesh–Haiti relations refer to the bilateral relations between Bangladesh and Haiti. The relations between the two countries have been largely influenced by the role of Bangladeshi peacekeepers in Haiti. There have been some bilateral cultural exchanges, mostly sports related. Bangladesh has a non resident ambassador in Washington DC. Haiti has a non resident ambassador in Taipei.

== Contribution of Bangladeshi peacekeepers ==
Bangladeshi peacekeepers are playing an active role in maintaining peace and stability in Haiti. Bangladeshi peacekeepers in Haiti were first deployed in 2004 as part of United Nations Stabilization Mission in Haiti. In 2010, Haiti became the first country to receive all-female Bangladeshi police contingent. In 2012, officers of Bangladeshi police unit were awarded United Nations medal for their contribution in managing law enforcement in Haiti.

== Humanitarian assistance ==
In the aftermath of 2010 Haiti earthquake, the Health ministry of Bangladesh government sent a medical team in Haiti consisting of 20 doctors and 10 health technicians.

== Cultural exchange ==
Haitian football players, such as Sony Norde and Pascal Millien, have played for Bangladeshi football clubs.

== See also ==
- Foreign relations of Bangladesh
- Foreign relations of Haiti
