= Haiti–Poland relations =

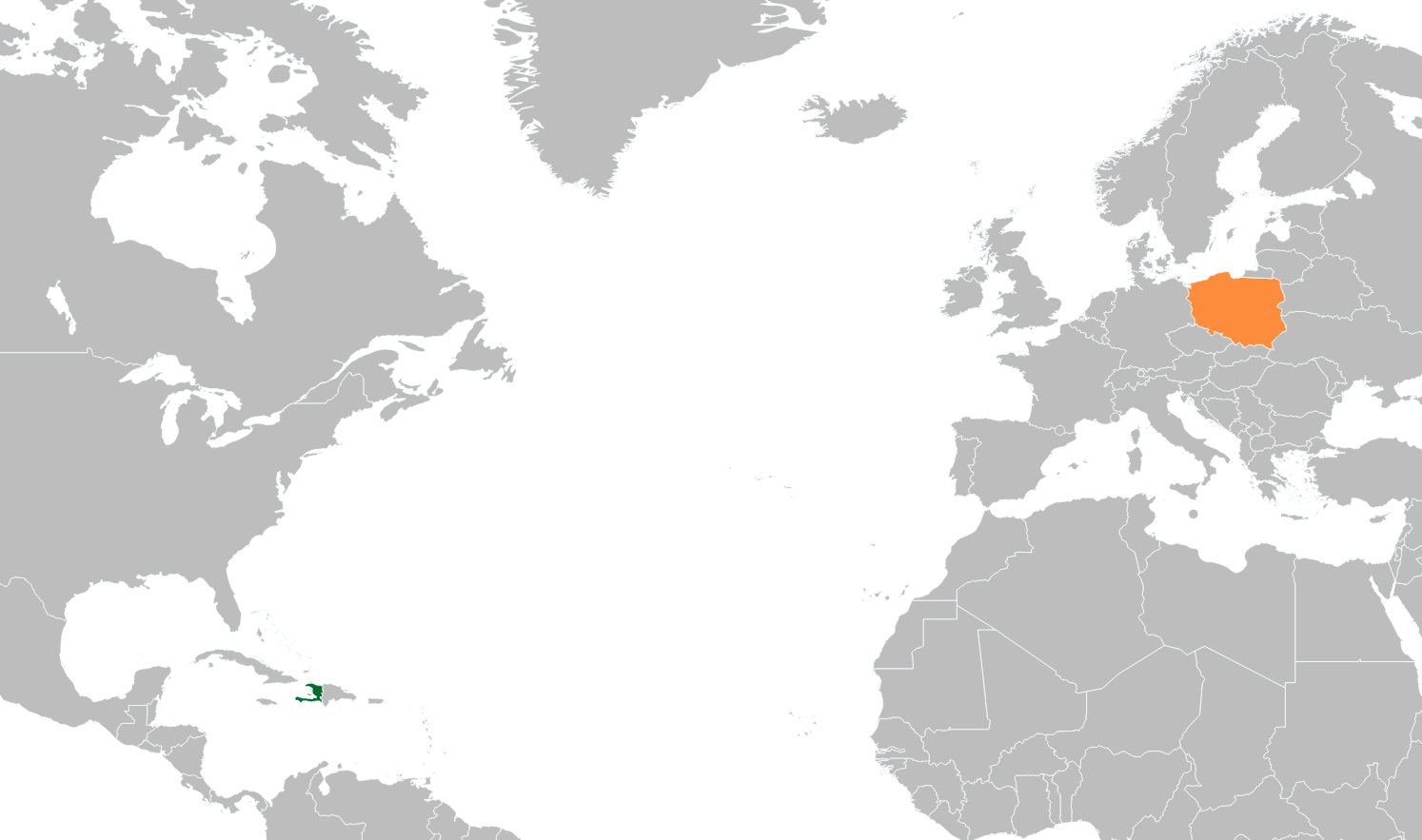

- Haiti: Poland

Diplomatic mission
- Embassy of Poland, Panama City: Embassy of Haiti, Berlin

Haiti–Poland relations refer to the bilateral relations between Haiti and Poland. Contacts date back to the Polish contribution in the Haitian Revolution in the early 19th century, with diplomatic relations established after World War I. Both countries are members of the United Nations and the World Trade Organization.

== History ==
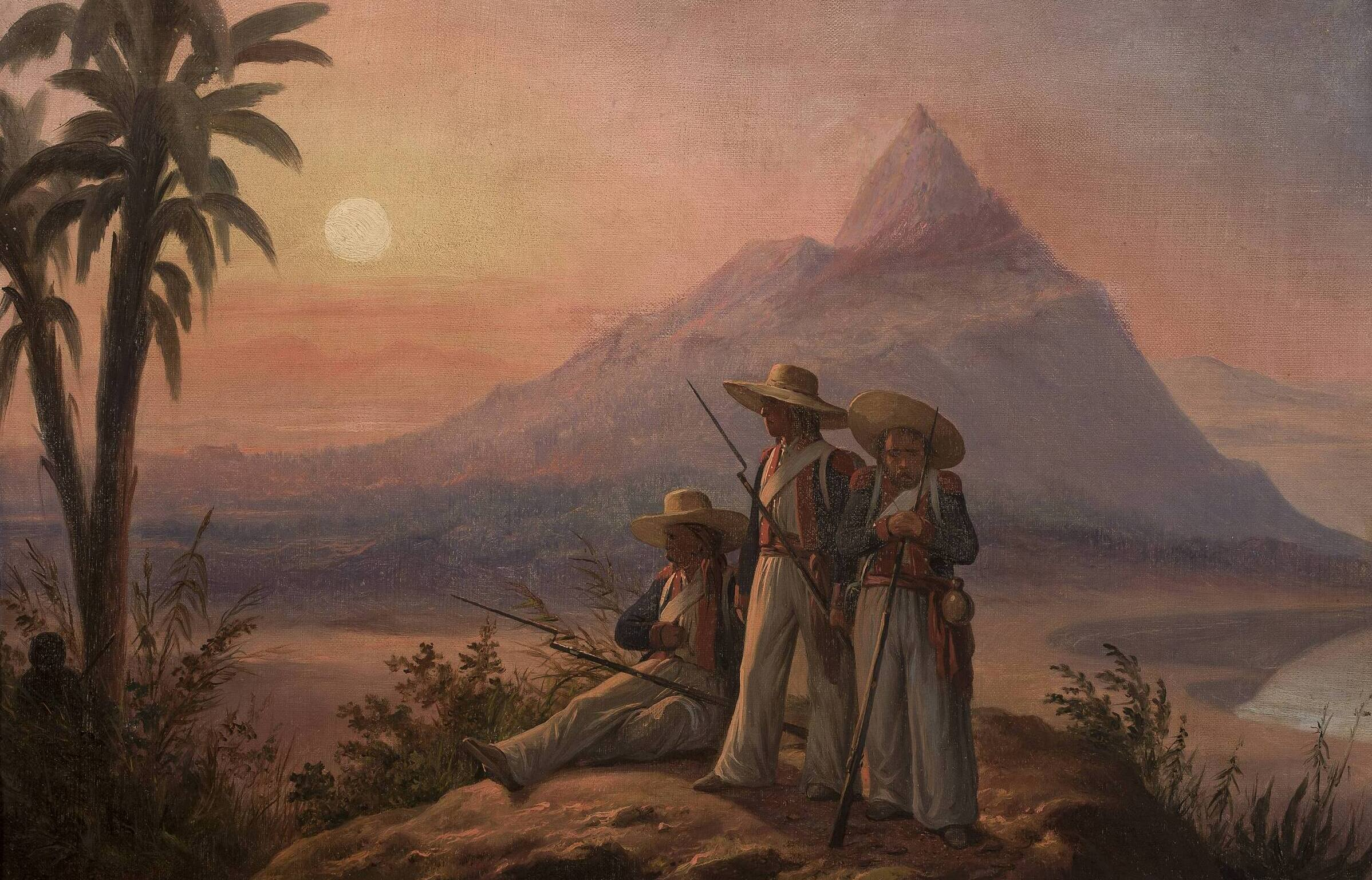
19th-century painting by January Suchodolski of Polish troops in Saint-Domingue

In 1802, Napoleon sent Polish Legionnaires to then French-ruled Saint-Domingue to fight off a slave rebellion. Poles, who fought on the side of France in hopes of restoration of their recently partitioned and occupied homeland, were lied to that they would fight against rebellious prisoners, and after learning the truth, many defected to join the Haitian Revolution against the French colonialists.

Boisrond-Tonnerre called the Poles the white Negroes of Europe, the term the first head of state of Haiti Jean-Jacques Dessalines adopted later, in an expression of respect and empathy for the situation of the Poles. Many Poles were later sold to the British.

On the same afternoon [18th of April 1804], Perkins received on board his Britannic Majesty's frigate Tartar, one hundred and twenty Polish soldiers, sold to the British government for seventy-four dollars per head. Dessaline called these unhappy men the white negroes of Europe.

— Peter S. Chazotte, Esq.

The 1805 Haitian constitution granted the Poles Haitian citizenship. A Polish community lives in Haiti to this day with their main center in Casale.

Diplomatic relations were established after Poland regained independence following World War I. An honorary consulate of Poland was located in Port-au-Prince from 1935 to 1945. It was reopened in 2005.

In 1994, 51 soldiers of the Polish GROM Military Unit took part in the Operation Uphold Democracy to remove the military regime installed after the 1991 Haitian coup d'état and restore the elected President Jean-Bertrand Aristide. In addition to their assigned duties, Polish commandos intervened several times in various cases of common residents against criminals and former military men, including providing medical treatment to impoverished people, rescuing people from lynching, and rescuing a Haitian child kidnapped presumably by former Haitian military officers, gaining the sympathy of impoverished Haitians, but at the same time the resentment of wealthier residents sympathizing with the ousted military regime. Polish commandos also took part in the relief operation following Hurricane Gordon, aiding Haitian residents and saving five Filipino soldiers. President Aristide thanked the Polish commandos for their service with the Polish word "dziękuję", meaning "thank you."

Caritas Poland, UNICEF Poland and the Polish Humanitarian Action raised over 5 million PLN to help the Haitians affected by the 2010 Haiti earthquake.

== Trade ==
All imports from Haiti to Poland are duty-free and quota-free, with the exception of armaments, as part of the Everything but Arms initiative of the European Union.

== Diplomatic missions ==
- Haiti is accredited to Poland from its embassy in Berlin.
- Poland is accredited to Haiti from its embassy in Panama City.

== See also ==
- Foreign relations of Haiti
- Foreign relations of Poland
