= Haiti–Turkey relations =

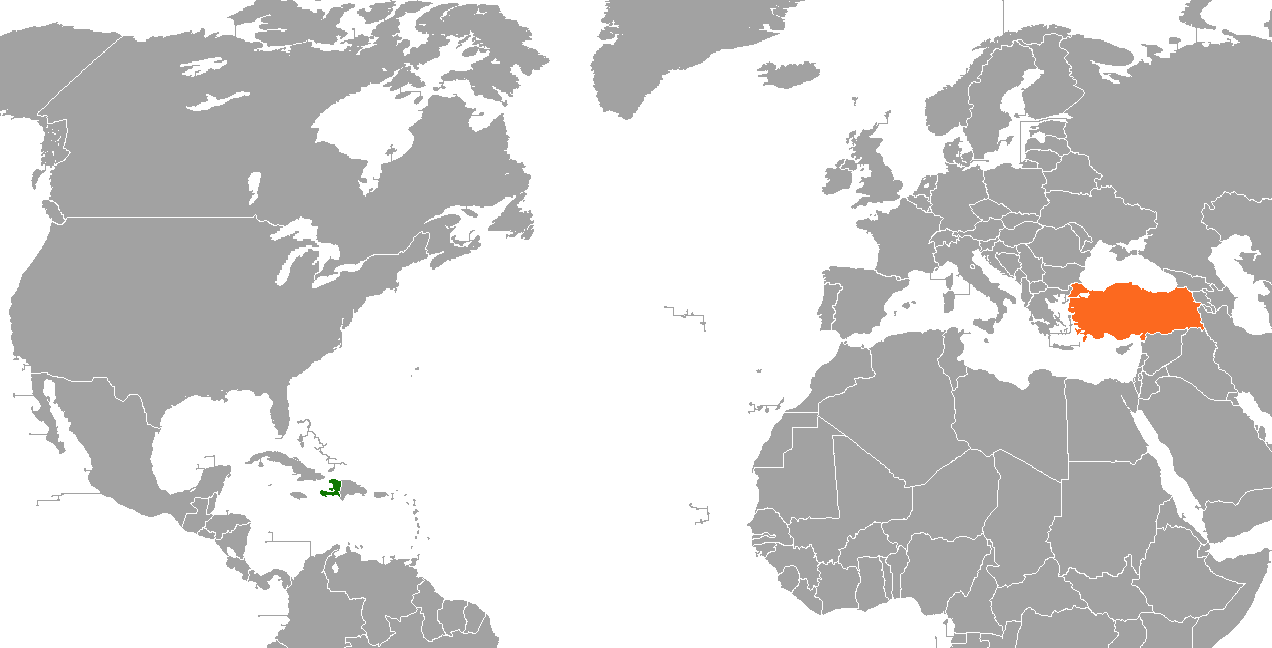

- Haiti: Turkey

Haiti–Turkey relations have been limited due to geographical distance until the opening of a Turkish Cooperation and Coordination Agency (TIKA) in response to the 2010 Haiti earthquake.

The Embassy of Turkey in Santo Domingo is accredited to Republic of Haiti.

After the earthquake, Turkey provided financial and in-kind aids that worth 1 million US Dollars each and the Turkish Cooperation and Coordination Agency (TIKA) provided financial aid and equipment worth US$124 million.

In addition to the financial assistance, Turkey has allocated staff to MINUSTAH in Haiti since the beginning of its operation in 2004.

== Economic relations ==
Trade volume between the two countries was US$129.7 million in 2019 (Turkish exports/imports: US$128.9/0.8 million).

== See also ==
- Foreign relations of Haiti
- Foreign relations of Turkey
