= Haiti–Israel relations =

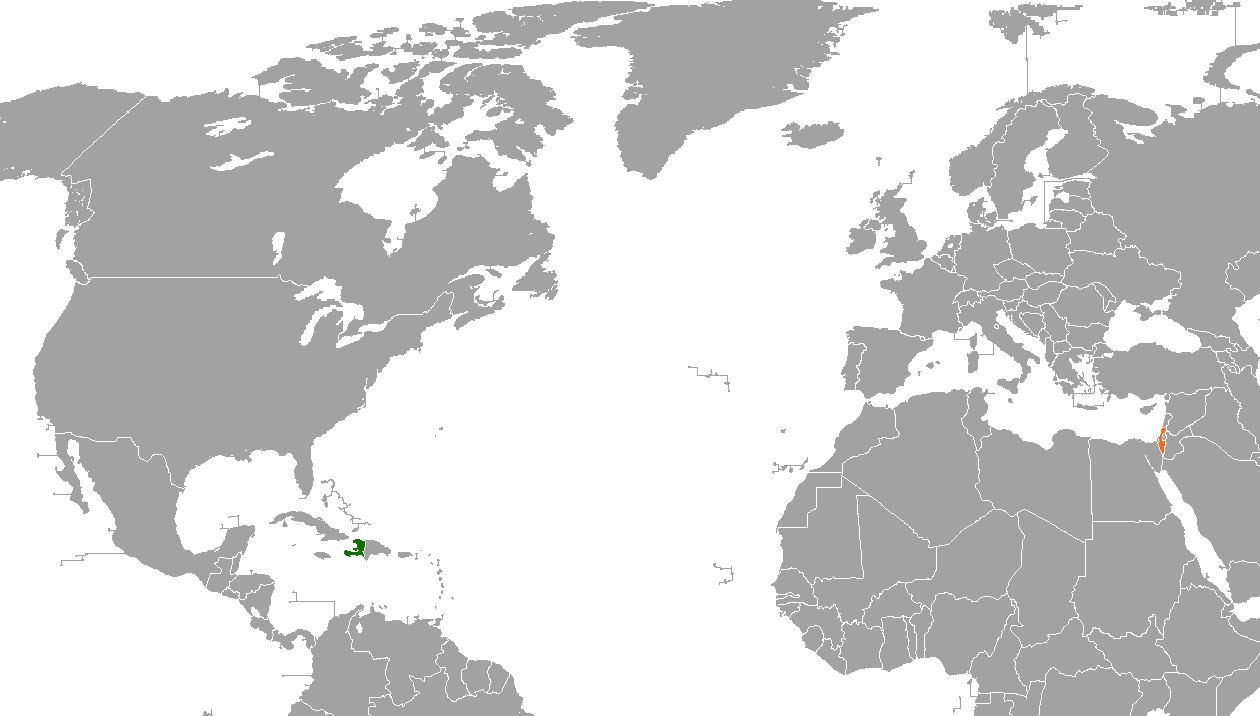

- Haiti: Israel

Haiti–Israel relations refers to the bilateral relations between Haiti and Israel. Haiti recognized Israel's independence on 17 March 1949. The Israeli ambassador in Panama represents Israeli interests in Haiti as Israel has an honorary consulate in its capital of Port-au-Prince.

In 1947, Haiti voted in favour of the UN partition of Palestine that helped create the state of Israel.

== History ==
=== Early history ===
In 1947, Haiti voted in favor of the United Nations’ partition of Palestine that helped create the State of Israel.

Prior to 1980, Haiti had an embassy in Jerusalem, the disputed capital city of Israel, but moved it to Tel Aviv following United Nations Security Council Resolution 478.

=== Modern history ===
Currently, Jewish-Haitian businessman, Gilbert Bigio is the honorary consul of Israel in Haiti, and has a large Israeli flag flying outside his home. "There has never been any anti-Semitism in this country... The Haitians always had admiration for Israel, and now more so than ever," Bigio told the Jewish Telegraphic Agency.

==== 2010 earthquake ====
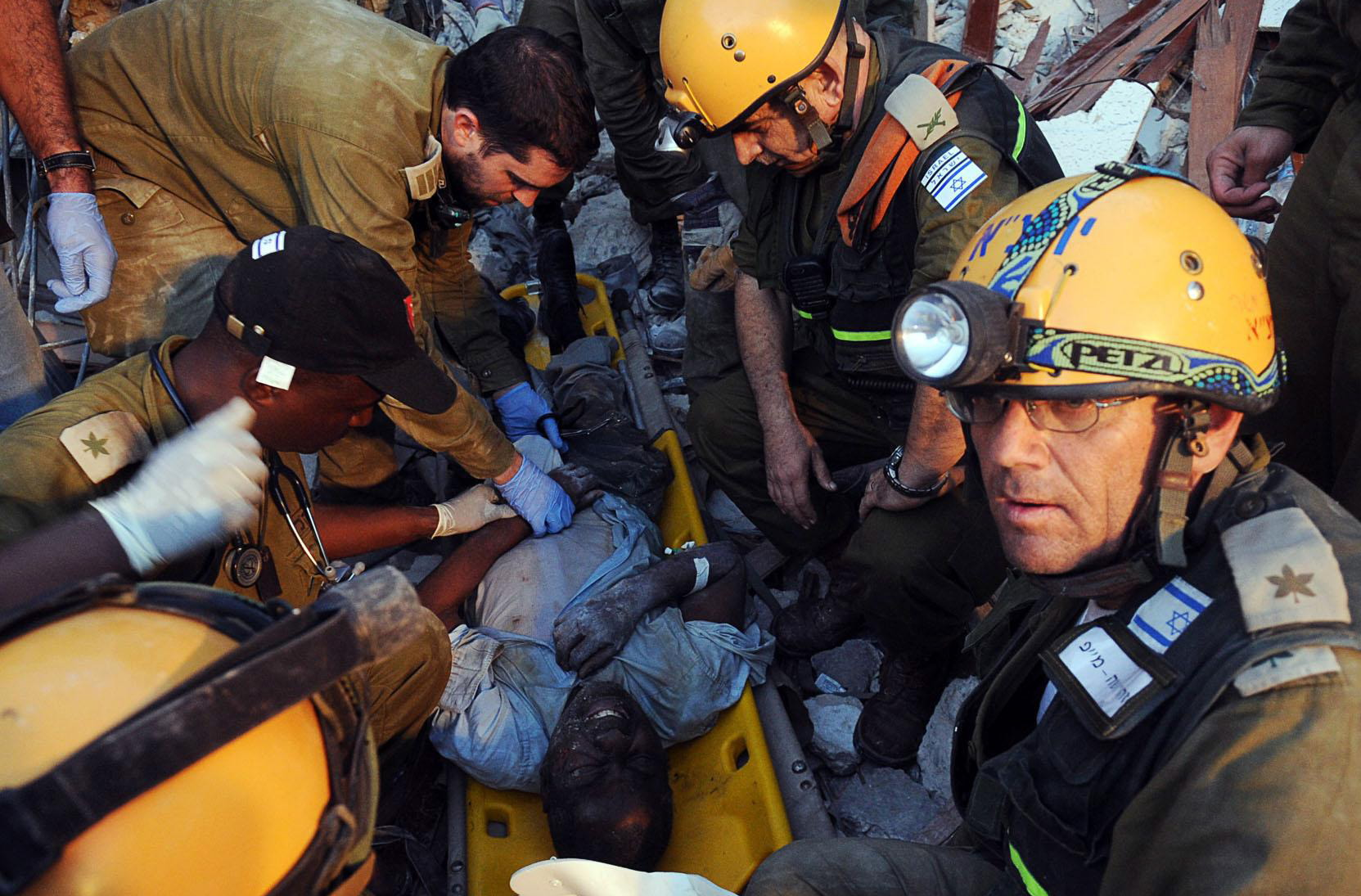
The Israel Defense Forces search and rescue team extracted a 52-year-old Haitian government employee, trapped in the ruins of the customs office in Port-au-Prince after 6 hours of work.

In the wake of the devastating earthquake that destroyed much of Haiti's capital, Port-au-Prince, killing more than 300,000 people and leaving nearly a million more homeless and without food, water or shelter, Israel was one of the first countries to send crews to assist in the devastated land. The Israel Defense Forces sent both search and rescue teams that sought remaining survivors, among crumbled buildings and homes as well sending medical teams to help care for the survivors. The medical team succeeded in setting up the first fully functioning field hospital, inclusive of an excess amount of advanced equipment. "During its time in Haiti, the delegation treated more than 1110 patients, conducted 319 successful surgeries, delivered 16 births including three by Cesarean sections and saved many from within the ruins." On January 27, following the rescue team operations in Haiti, the Israeli government decided to continue its official assistance to Haiti coordinated through MASHAV, Israel's Agency for International Development Cooperation, and Ministry of Foreign Affairs, in part of a global effort to reconstruct the country. Local Jewish Israeli-Haitian businessman, Daniel Kedar, has become the de facto coordinator for Israeli forces in Haiti.

== See also ==
- Foreign relations of Haiti
- Foreign relations of Israel
- History of the Jews in Haiti
