= Haiti–Spain relations =

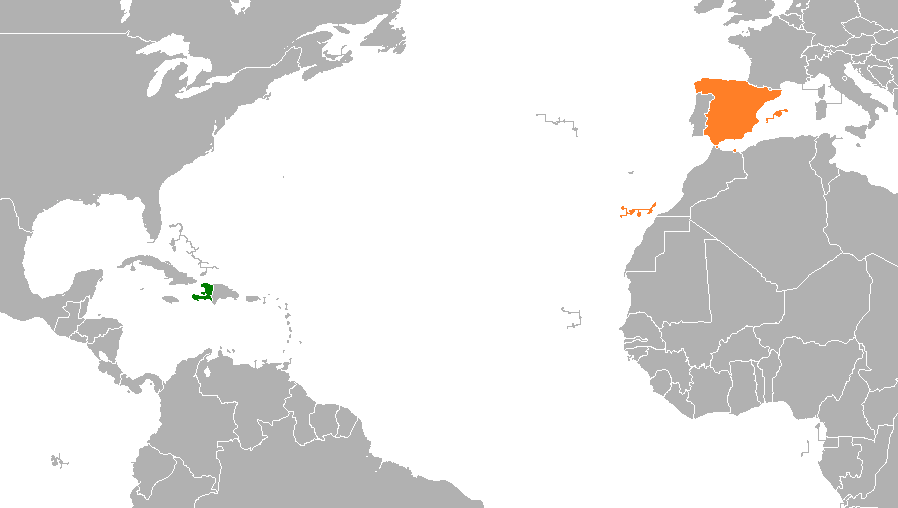

- Haiti: Spain

Haiti–Spain relations are the bilateral relations between Haiti and Spain. Haiti has an embassy in Madrid, Spain has an embassy in Port-au-Prince.

== Historical relations ==
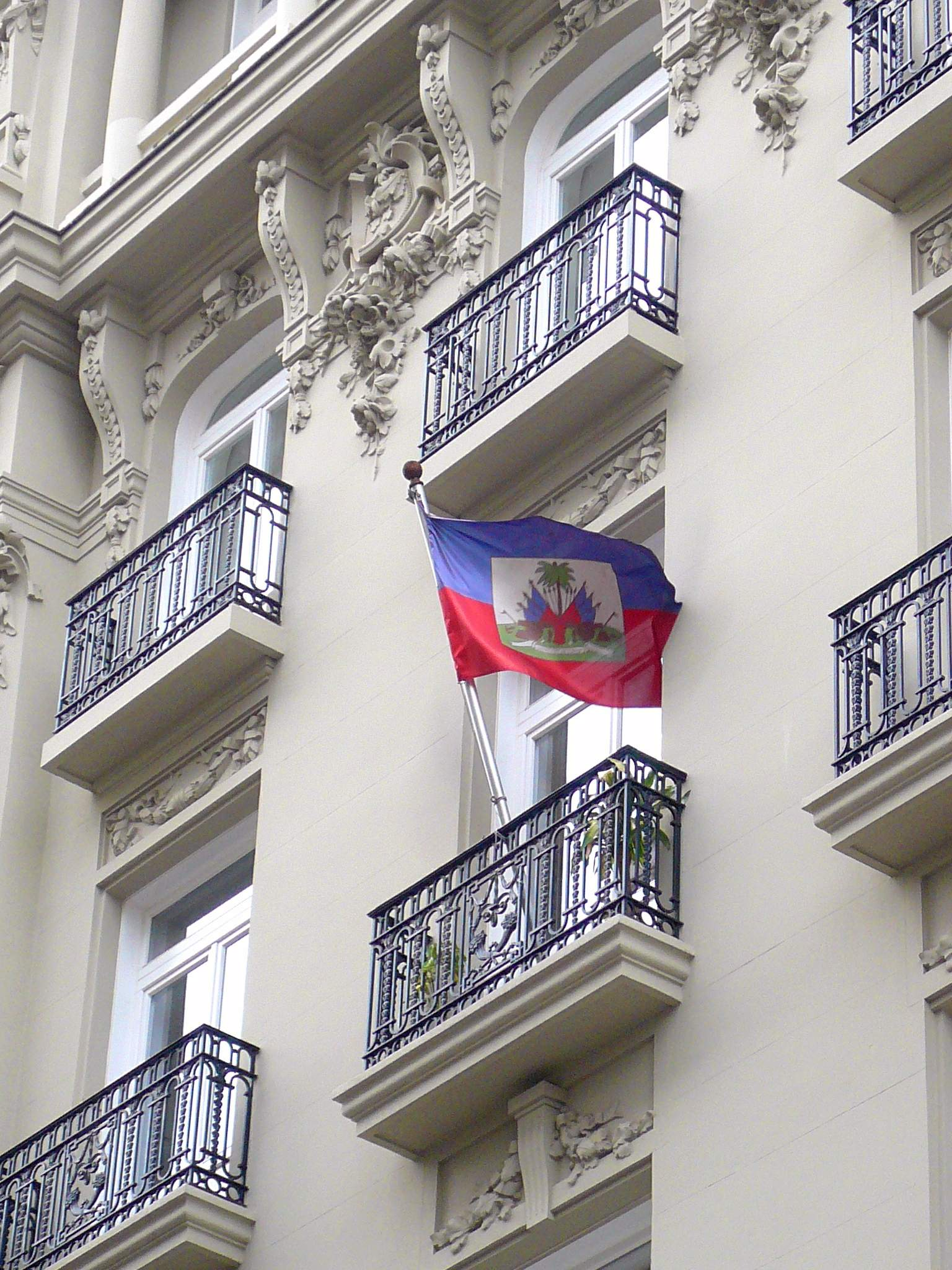
Embassy of Haiti in Madrid

On 17 December 1492, Christopher Columbus arrived at La Española, part of what would later be called Greater Antilles, and the island became part of the Spanish Empire. Before the arrival of the Spaniards, it was inhabited by Arawakan-speaking groups, such as the Kalinago and Taínos. At the beginning of the 17th century, due to the boom that had acquired the informal trade of the Creole settlers of the island and that went against the monopoly that the metropolis intended, the Spanish governor Antonio de Osorio ordered between 1605 and 1606 the depopulation of the central and western part of the island in order to stop this practice. Over time, the bucaneros, men who lived on cattle hunting and maroon pigs, the fur trade and tobacco cultivation, settled down in the unpopulated areas of the western part, as well as the filibusters, both of French origin. They first occupied the Turtle Island and later these settlements determined that the western part of the island was claimed by France. In 1697, Spain ceded that part of the island to France by the Treaty of Ryswick, constituting the French Saint Domingue.

== Diplomatic relations ==
Bilateral relations between Spain and Haiti are very good, and have been throughout the 20th century. Haiti recognized the Government of General Franco on April 1, 1939. In December 1946, like almost all the countries that had relations with Spain, he retired his ambassador from Madrid in compliance with the Resolution of United Nations of December 13, 1946. However, on October 6, 1949, said recommendation still in force, the Republic of Haiti restored its diplomatic representation in Spain. In 1951, Spain established its embassy in Haiti, and since then, there have been close bilateral relations between the two countries.

== Economic relations ==
Although the country does not have an interesting internal market (10 million inhabitants of which 80% live below the poverty line) Haiti is presented as a platform for export to other countries in the area, including the US, and Especially for textile products. The import of construction products is another sector that could be attractive to Spanish exporters. All imports from Haiti to Spain are duty-free and quota-free, with the exception of armaments, as part of the Everything but Arms initiative of the European Union.

== Cooperation ==
The Spanish cooperation was reinforced after the earthquake of 2010, reaching the figure of 346 million € in the following years. As agreed with the Haitian Government, the priority sectors of action are: Water and Sanitation, Education, Production Sector, and Rural Development and Fight against Hunger. With regard to geographical priorities, the Spanish Cooperation focuses its interventions in the Department of the West (which includes Port-au-Prince), Central and Southeast.

== High level visits ==
On the Haitian side, President Michel Martelly has twice visited Spain as Head of State. The first trip was made in July 2011 and the second in November 2012, when he attended the Ibero-American Summit of Cádiz, in which Haiti participated for the first time as an observer. In early 2014, Tourism Minister Stephanie Balmir Villedroin visited Spain as part of FITUR 2014 to promote Haiti as a tourist destination.

== See also ==
- Foreign relations of Haiti
- Foreign relations of Spain
