= Brazil–Haiti relations =

- Brazil: Haiti

Diplomatic mission
- Embassy of the Federal Republic of Brazil in Port-au-Prince: Embassy of the Republic of Haiti in Brazil

Envoy
- Ambassador Luís Guilherme Nascentes da Silva: Ambassador Rachel Coupaud

Brazil–Haiti relations are the current and historical relations between the Federative Republic of Brazil and the Republic of Haiti. Both nations are members of the Community of Latin American and Caribbean States, Organization of American States and the United Nations.

== History ==
Haiti was the first Latin-American nation to gain independence in 1804. This result inspired several nations in the region in their struggle for independence. In 1928, Brazil and Haiti established diplomatic relations. That same year, both nations opened diplomatic legations in their respective capitals. In 1953, the level of representation was raised to an embassy. Initially, relations between both nations took place in multilateral forums such as at the Organization of American States.

In June 2004, the United Nations Stabilisation Mission in Haiti (UNSTAMIH) was created as a result of the 2004 Haitian coup d'état. In 2008, Brazilian President Luiz Inácio Lula da Silva paid an official visit to Haiti. During his visit, President da Silva met with President René Préval and with the Brazilian soldiers stationed in Haiti as part of the UN mission. In January 2010, Haiti was struck by a 7.0 earthquake. Brazil soon donated to the Haiti Reconstruction Fund (FRH), in the amount of US$55 million. In April 2010, Haitian President René Préval travelled to Brazil to attend the Brazil-Caribbean Community (CARICOM) Summit.

In February 2012, Brazilian President Dilma Rousseff paid a state visit to Haiti. During her visit, she met with President Michel Martelly and Prime Minister Garry Conille. On the agenda were economic ties and the efforts to assist Haitian refugees arriving in Brazil since the 2010 Haitian earthquake of which more than 15,000 Haitians have immigrated to Brazil. In 2012, the National Immigration Council of Brazil eliminated the limit of twelve hundred annual permanent visas for humanitarian reasons, which could be granted to Haitian nationals.

In June 2017, Brazilian Foreign Minister Aloysio Nunes traveled to Haiti to participate in the ceremony for the transfer of command from Brazil and reviewed the last military contingent of Brazilian MINUSTAH troops, thus marking the final period of Brazil's mission in Haiti. More than 36,000 Brazilian military personnel have passed through the mission since its establishment in 2004, making Brazil the largest country contributing troops.

== Defense and security ==
=== Military ===
While there is no public documentation of purchases, Haiti has been purchasing small arms from Brazil, mainly the Taurus T4 rifle and the Taurus TH9 pistol. The last batch arrived on 4 September 2024, with Minister of Foreign Affairs Dominique Dupuy, after her official trip to Brazil.

A delegation of Haitian Army officers and staffers of the ministry of Defense traveled to Brazil, specifically Rio de Janeiro, to attend LAAD Defence & Security 2025. They were seen talking to a representative at the Taurus Armas booth.

A meeting between Haitian Prime Minister Alix Didier Fils-Aimé, Lieutenant General Derby Guerrier, and Brazilian Ambassador to Haiti Luís Fernando De Carvalho took place in May 2025, over the prospects for military cooperation, and mechanisms for a lasting strategic partnership. Ambassador De Carvalho later met with Haitian chancellor Jean-Victor Harvel Jean-Baptiste to further discuss how Brazil could assist Haitian state forces, mainly through training for agents of the Haitian National Police and support for the Armed Forces of Haiti.

On March 27 2026, in a meeting between Foreign minister Raina Forbin and Brazilian ambassador Luís Guilherme Nascentes da Silva, the latter renewed his country's engagement to support the strengthening efforts of the Haitian military, with an accent on the Corps of Engineers. Brazilian Army instructors are planned to be sent to Haiti to provide training.

In a May 20 meeting between Minister Andresol and Ambassador da Silva, talks were held over strengthening cooperation between both nations, particularly around the training of new non-commissioned officers, commissioned offers and General Staff cadres. Minister Andresol is scheduled to meet with his Brazilian counterpart, José Múcio, at the upcoming Conference of Defense Ministers of the Americas (CDMA) in Peru, in July 2026.

== High-level visits ==
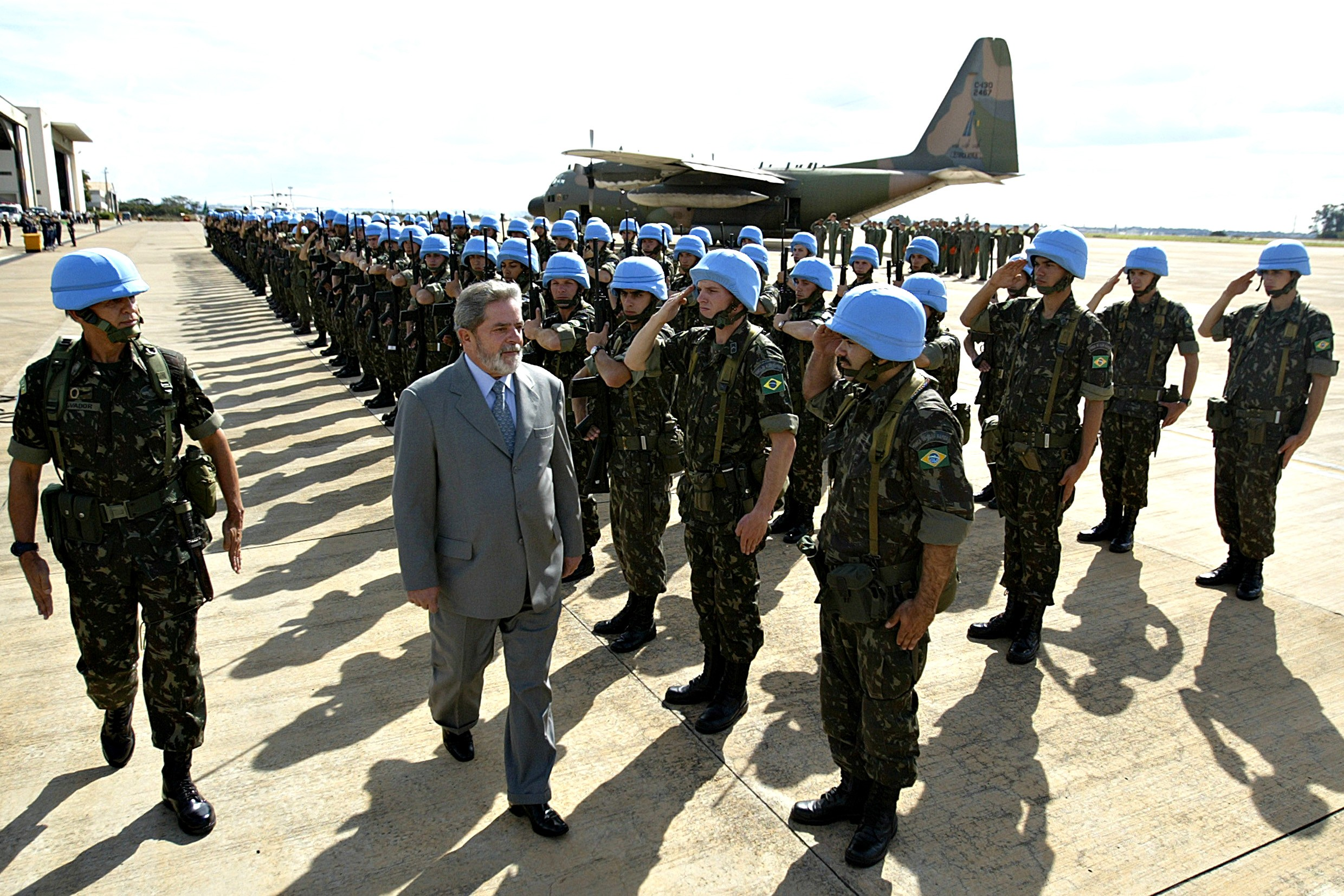
Brazilian President Luiz Inácio Lula da Silva reviewing Brazilian soldiers stationed in Haiti as part of the United Nations Stabilisation Mission in Haiti; 2008.

High-level visits from Brazil to Haiti

- President Luiz Inácio Lula da Silva (2008)
- Defense Minister Nelson Jobim (2009, 2010, 2011)
- Foreign Minister Antonio Patriota (February and June 2011)
- President Dilma Rousseff (2012)
- Foreign Minister Luiz Alberto Figueiredo (2013)
- Foreign Minister Aloysio Nunes (2017)

High-level visits from Haiti to Brazil

- Foreign Minister Jean Robert Estimé (1982)
- President René Préval (2010)
- Prime Minister Laurent Lamothe (2013)
- Foreign Minister Pierre Duly Brutus (2014)
- Foreign Minister Lener Renauld (2016)

== Bilateral agreements ==
Both nations have signed a few agreements such as an Agreement for Cultural Cooperation (1966); Agreement on Bilateral and Technical Cooperation (1982) and a Tripartite Brazil-Cuba-Haiti Agreement on the Program for Strengthening the Health Authority of Haiti (2010).

== Resident diplomatic missions ==
- Brazil has an embassy in Port-au-Prince.
- Haiti has an embassy in Brasília and consulates-general in Florianópolis, Salvador and in São Paulo.

== See also ==
- Haitian Brazilians
