= Haiti–Mexico relations =

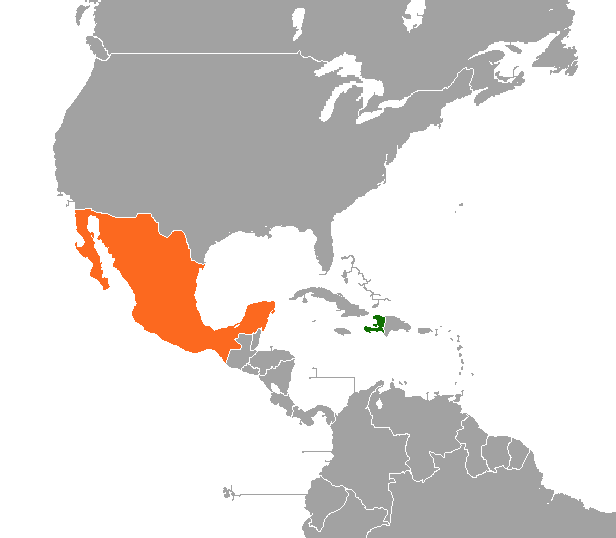

- Haiti: Mexico

Diplomatic mission
- Embassy of Haiti in Mexico: Embassy of Mexico in Haiti

Envoy
- Ambassador Hubert Labbé: Chargé d'Affaires Jesús Cisneros

The nations of Haiti and Mexico established consular relations in 1882 and formal diplomatic relations were established in 1929. Both nations are members of Association of Caribbean States, Community of Latin American and Caribbean States, Organization of American States and the United Nations.

== History ==
Haiti was the first Latin-American nation to gain independence in 1804 from France. This result inspired several nations in the region in their struggle for independence. In 1816, Mexican General Martín Javier Mina y Larrea traveled to Haiti to gain support for Mexico's independence from Spain. Consular relations between Haiti and Mexico were established in 1882 with formal diplomatic relations being established on 11 July 1929. In 1934, a Mexican diplomatic office was opened in Port-au-Prince and in 1943 the diplomatic office was elevated to an embassy. That same year, Haiti opened an embassy in Mexico City.

Between the years 1957–1986, Haiti was ruled by President François Duvalier and later by his son, Jean-Claude Duvalier. During this time period, several high level Haitian politicians, students and activists sought refuge in the Mexican embassy in the capital including former politician and author, Gérard Pierre-Charles who spent 26 years living in Mexico. In February 1991, President Jean-Bertrand Aristide came to power. He was later toppled in a coup d'état in September 1991 and forced to flee the country. That same month, Aristide's Prime Minister René Préval sought refuge in the Mexican embassy where he remained for eleven months until being granted safe-conduct and fled to Mexico. René Préval would later become President of Haiti in February 1996 – 2001 and again in 2006 – 2011.

In January 2010, Haiti experienced a 7.0 earthquake. Like several countries, Mexico responded by providing food and other essential emergency aid. Soon following the earthquake, over 1,300 Mexican medical workers arrived to Haiti along with 15,000 tons of humanitarian aid and over 51 thousand tents to provide temporary shelter. Mexican soldiers also partook in search and rescue. Since 2010, the Mexican government has given over US$8 million in financial assistance to the Haitian government and people.

In 2012, President Felipe Calderón became the first Mexican head-of-state to visit Haiti. While in Haiti, President Calderon met with Haitian President Michel Martelly and they discussed bilateral relations between both nations and Mexico's development aid to the country. In April 2013, Mexican President Enrique Peña Nieto paid a visit to Haiti. In 2015, Mexico contributed military personnel to the United Nations Stabilisation Mission in Haiti.

In 2016, approximately 5,000 Haitian nationals, while in Mexico; were denied entry into the United States when President Barack Obama ended allowing Haitians into the country on humanitarian grounds. Many of the Haitians remained in Mexico, primarily in the border cities of Mexicali and Tijuana.

As part of an effort to increase humanitarian assistance and help with the recuperation of Haiti, Mexico provides government scholarships to 300 Haitian students to study at Mexican universities per year. In November 2021 Haiti opened a consulate in the southern Mexican city of Tapachula, Chiapas to best attend to the surge of Haitian migrants entering Mexico. That same year, over 51,000 Haitians applied for asylum in Mexico.

In October 2023, Haitian Prime Minister Ariel Henry paid a visit to Palenque, Chiapas to attend a Summit on Migration, hosted by Mexican President Andrés Manuel López Obrador.

== Defense and security ==
After former defense minister Hervé Denis' attendance to the CDMA in Mexico in 2018, a Mexican delegation headed by Brigadier General Porfilio Fuentes travelled to Haiti to meet the Haitian armed forces high command, where they held a two-day workshop on the strategies of military cooperation and support to the ministry. As part of the bilateral cooperation accord between Mexico and Haiti, signed on 7 October 2018, 50 Non-commissioned officer of the Armed Forces of Haiti get a formation at the "Escuela Militar de Sargentos" of the Mexican Army, in Puebla, Mexico.

On 16 August 2019, the first class of servicemembers formed in Haiti, composed of 248 soldiers, 50 NCOs, and 15 officers, would graduate from the recruiting depot at the Anacaona Military Training Center, in Léogâne. That class was trained by Mexican military instructors, led by Colonel Léon Borja. The 15 officers would then travel to Mexico for further training at the Temamatla military mase.

In 2022, 29 NCOs would get trained at the "Centro de Adiestramiento de Fuerzas Especiales" in Temamatla, Mexico to become drill instructors in order to facilitate the formation of new soldiers on Haitian soil. Another company of 150 soldiers would go to Mexico to get a formation by the Mexican Army and Mexican National Guard, in subjects including drone warfare, guerilla warfare, sniper training, demolition. That company upon their return to Haiti would become the National Guard Unit (Unité de Garde Nationale) that was trained. 30 soldiers in 2022, and 100 in 2023, travelled to Mexico for special operations training with the Cuerpo de Fuerzas Especiales, becoming the first Special forces unit of the new FAd'H.

On December 5, 2024, a meeting between the newly appointed defense minister Jean Michel Moise, and the chargé d'affaires of Mexico in Haiti, Jesus Cisneros, reaffirmed existing military cooperation between both countries. They announced that this cooperation will continue and expand going into 2025, with assistance to the FAD'H to build training facilities on the newly established "Vertières" base, which will also serve as a basic training camp. Talks were also held over building a warrant officer program with aims to professionalize and modernize the armed forces. In an interview with Le Nouvelliste, Mr. Cisneros states that Mexico hopes to provide specialized training to more than 100 Haitian servicemen during 2025, one of those subjects being pilot training. He also announced that a project of non-lethal military aid to the Haitian military was on the way.

Due to delays in the construction project of the Basic Training Center at the Vertières military base, Minister Moise announced that Mexico via the Mexican Army would be welcoming and providing training for 700 recruits, in groups of 150. On July 24, 2025, the first group of 150 recruits departed to Mexico for 3-months long training course aboard Mexican Air Force EADS CASA C-295 planes, who brought 1000 personal protection kits to the Haitian military, courtesy of the AMEXCID. Since 2018, Mexico has contributed to the training on 912 Haitian servicemen.

== High-level visits ==
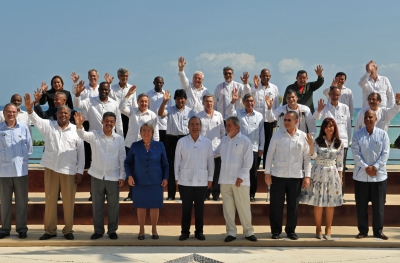
Haitian President René Préval attending the Rio Group summit in Cancun, 2010.

High-level visits from Haiti to Mexico

- President Jean-Bertrand Aristide (2004)
- President René Préval (2010)
- President Michel Martelly (2014, 2015)
- Foreign Minister Pierre Duly Brutus (2014)
- President Jovenel Moïse (2017, 2018)
- Defense Minister Hervé Denis (2018)
- Lieutenant General Jodel Lessage (2019)
- Colonel Fontane Beaubien (2019)
- Foreign Minister Claude Joseph (2021)
- Prime Minister Ariel Henry (2023)

High-level visits from Mexico to Haiti

- Foreign Secretary Patricia Espinosa (2010)
- President Felipe Calderón (2012)
- President Enrique Peña Nieto (2013)
- Foreign Secretary José Antonio Meade (2013)
- Brigadier general Porfirio Fuentes (2018)
- Colonel Léon Borja (2019)

== Bilateral agreements ==
Both nations have signed a few bilateral agreement such as an Agreement for mutual non-fee visa issuance (1942) and an Agreement on Technical and Scientific Cooperation (2003).

== Trade relations ==
In 2023, total trade between the two nations amounted to US$80 million. Haiti's main exports to Mexico include: textiles and clothing. Mexico's main exports to Haiti include: food, bottled water, motor vehicles, medicine and electric accumulators. Mexican multinational company Cemex operates in Haiti.

== Resident diplomatic missions ==
of Haiti in Mexico

- Mexico City (Embassy)
- Tapachula (Consulate-General)
- Tijuana (Consulate-General)

of Mexico in Haiti

- Port-au-Prince (Embassy)

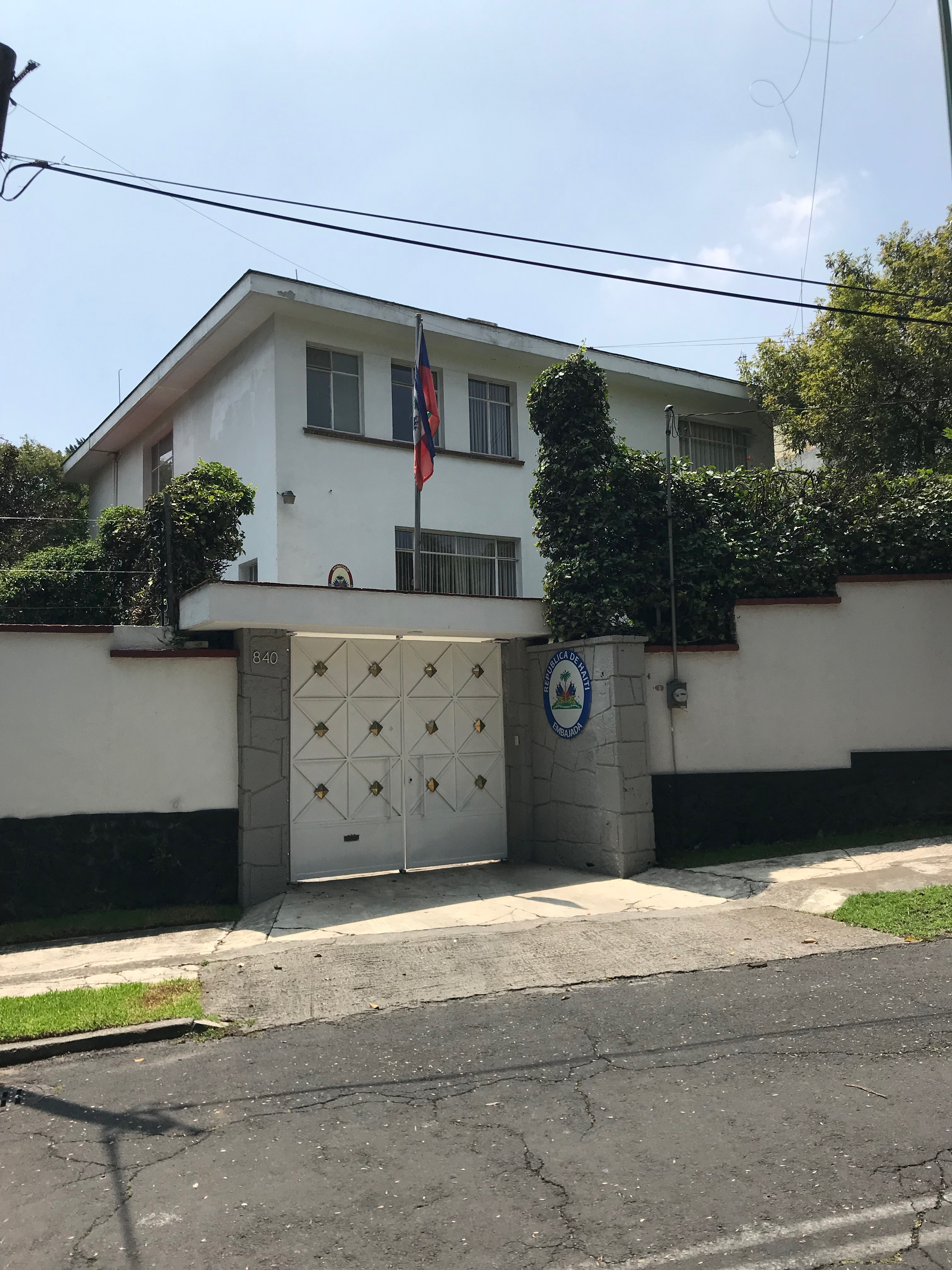
Embassy of Haiti in Mexico City

== See also ==
- Haitian Mexicans
