= Haiti–Jamaica relations =

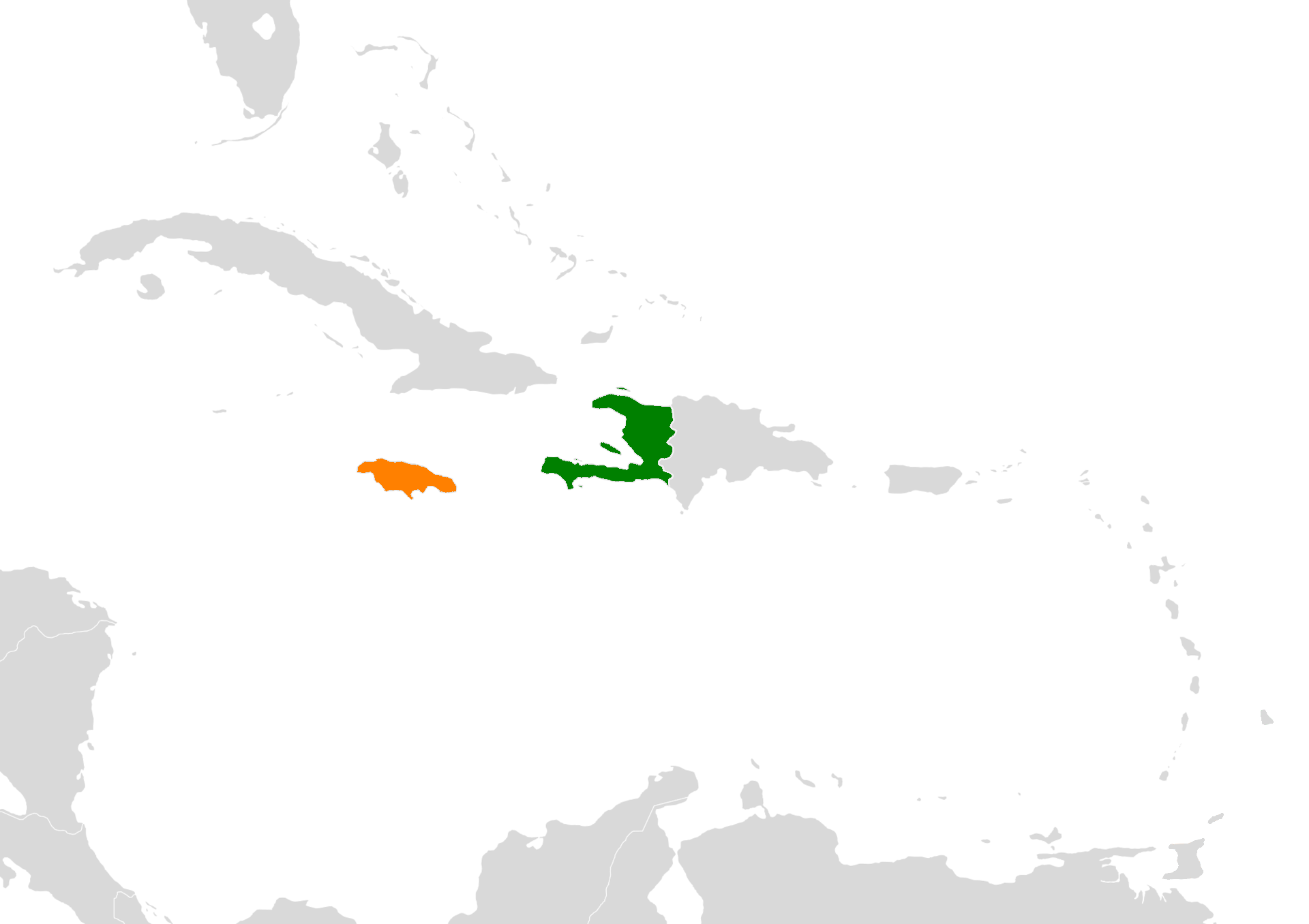

- Haiti: Jamaica

Haiti and Jamaica have bilateral relations. Both nations have honorary consulates in their respective capitals. The two countries share a maritime boundary.

== History ==
During the 18th century, Haiti and Jamaica were the two most profitable European colonies, with sugar dominating both economies. When the Haitian Revolution broke out, many French settlers fled to Jamaica with their slaves. Jamaican white settlers were afraid those "French Negroes" would spread rebellious ideas throughout the local enslaved populations, and applied stricter rules and regulations to contain it.

The French plotted to invade Jamaica. Toussaint Louverture had made a secret deal with the British not to invade Jamaica in exchange for removing the British blockage of Haiti. While Britain never gained control over Haiti, it continuously used it as leverage to maintain its control over Jamaica.

Since Haiti's independence in 1804, Jamaica has been a frequent destination for exiled former Haitian leaders and politicians, starting with the 3rd president, Charles Rivière-Hérard. After his overthrow in 2004, Haitian president Jean-Bertrand Aristide exiled in Jamaica.

In January 2007, Haitian President René Préval made a four-day working visit to Jamaica. At a press conference, Jamaican Prime Minister Portia Simpson Miller announced that a Joint Jamaica/Haiti Commission would be convened later that year.

== Trade ==
In 2023, Haitian exports to Jamaica amounted to $2.5 (mainly plastic lids) and Jamaican exports to Haiti amounted to $32.1 million (mainly refined petroleum).

== Illegal trade ==
A guns-for-drugs trade was exposed by the Jamaica Gleaner in 2020, where smugglers from Jamaica delivered marijuana to Haiti in exchange for handguns and assault weapons. The maritime shipping is handled by local fishermen well-informed when the waters are clear from coast guards.
