= Canadian diaspora =

People from Canada who reside outside of Canada

Map of the Canadian diaspora in the world (might include people with Canadian citizenship and children of Canadians). Canada + 100,000 + 10,000 + 1,000

The Canadian diaspora is the group of Canadians living outside of Canada. As of a 2010 report by the Asia Pacific Foundation of Canada and The Canadian Expat Association, there were 2.8 million Canadian citizens abroad (plus an unknown number of former citizens and descendants of citizens). For comparison, that is a larger population than six of the ten Canadian provinces. More than 9% of all Canadian citizens live outside of Canada. That compares to 1.7% of Americans, 2.6% of Chinese citizens, 3.3% of French citizens, 4.3% of Australians, 9% of British citizens, and 21.9% of New Zealanders.

In past decades, most Canadians leaving the country have moved to the United States. In the 1980s, Los Angeles had the fourth largest Canadian population of any city in North America, with New York close behind. Other countries and cities have emerged as major sites of Canadian settlement, notably Hong Kong, London, Beirut, Sydney, Paris, and Dubai. The population in New York experienced continued growth in the 2000s, doubling between 2000 and 2008 to 21,000, representing the eighth largest foreign-born group in the Borough of Manhattan.

A 2008 report by the Urban Institute estimated that "65,000 and 75,000 undocumented Canadians currently live in the United States."

The largest Canadian populations abroad by country are:

Country or Territory	Canadian citizens	Source
United States	1,062,640	Coulombe and DeVoretz, 2009
Hong Kong	300,000	Zhang and DeGolyer, 2011
France	90,000	foreign-born Canadians in France according to 2018 estimates
United Kingdom	87,000	foreign-born groups in the UK according to 2015 ONS estimates
Lebanon	45,000	DFAIT
United Arab Emirates	40,000	Montreal Gazette, 2007
Pakistan	30,000-50,000	Canadian High Commissioner, 2019
Australia	27,289	Dumont and Lemaitre, 2005
Germany	25,000	Destatis Bundesamt Germany 2021
China	19,990	Chinese Census 2010
South Korea	14,210	OECD, International Migration Database, 2008
Mexico	12,439	Canadian-born immigrants, 2020 Mexican Census
Japan	11,016	OECD, International Migration Database, 2008
Egypt	10,000	DFAIT
Brazil	9,991	Unicamp
New Zealand	7,770	Dumont and Lemaitre, 2005
Philippines	7,500	DFAIT
Qatar	7,250	bq magazine, 2014
Haiti	6,000	DFAIT
Switzerland	5,243	OECD, International Migration Database, 2008
Singapore	5,140	Foreign Ministry of Singapore
Thailand	5,000	DFAIT
Trinidad & Tobago	5,000	Parasram, 2009
Belgium	4,145	Dumont and Lemaitre, 2005
Finland	2,106	2019 UN migrant stock
Iceland	35	Alþingi Foreign Census 2017

Citizens born in Canada make up about 58% of the diaspora, the other 42% being people born outside Canada who became naturalized as Canadian citizens and then moved out again, often back to their country of origin, or sometimes to a third country. Native-born Canadians had an exit rate of about 1.33% over ten years from 1996 to 2006, compared to 4.5% for naturalized Canadians. Most Canadians in the United States are native-born, while most Canadians in Hong Kong are naturalized Canadians who were born in Hong Kong.

For native-born Canadians, the United States is the primary destination, and the emigration rate varies substantially by ethnicity. It is especially high among Middle Eastern, Eastern European, and South Asian Canadians, indicating that the English-speaking and well-educated children of immigrants are often highly mobile. French Canadians have the highest rate of return to Canada at 29%. Among naturalized Canadians, exit rates vary by country of origin, being highest among Canadians from typically highly developed countries (Hong Kong, United States, Taiwan, France). Exit rates among Canada's two largest immigrant populations, mainland Chinese and Indians, were very low during 1996 to 2006 but have risen.

British Columbians are particularly likely to go overseas, more than twice as likely as an Ontarian, and five times more likely as a Quebecer, according to a 2007 survey by The Vancouver Sun. Many of these are Hong Kong returnees; the so-called "astronauts" or "yacht people" who moved to Vancouver from Hong Kong in the 1980s and 90s, but later returned. However, two-thirds of Canadians overseas (in 2007) were Canadian-born, outnumbering returning immigrants.
