= Americans in France =

Ethnic group in France

Total population
- c. 110,000 – 191,930

Regions with significant populations
- Throughout France, plurality in Paris and major urban centers.

Languages
- French; American English; Spanish

Religion
- Protestantism; Judaism; Roman Catholicism; Other forms of Christianity

Related ethnic groups
- Americans in the United Kingdom

Americans in France (French: Américains en France) consists of immigrants and expatriates from the United States as well as French people of American ancestry. Immigration to France from the United States dates back to the 19th century and according to the American embassy in Paris, as of 2017, there are about 110,000 American citizens residing in France

== History ==
=== 19th Century ===
Unofficial figures suggest that around 50,000 free Black individuals, including some of Haitian descent, emigrated from Louisiana to Paris after Napoleon Bonaparte had sold Louisiana to the United States as part of Louisiana Purchase in 1803, due to the Haitian Revolution led by Jean-Jacques Dessalines in the French colony of Saint-Domingue (present day Haiti) where they finally won their independence in 1804 as the "First Free Black-led Republic" in both the New World and all the Americas.

Paris was the art capital of the world in the nineteenth century and has attracted painters, sculptors, and architects from around the world including the United States. In the decades following the American Civil War, hundreds of Americans joined the throngs headed to Paris. American artists, who formed the largest contingent of foreign painters and sculptors in Paris, were only one segment of the capital's extensive American colony, which also included writers, businessmen, diplomats, and others in more-or-less permanent residence.

Many American artists stayed together, and enclaves of them developed on the Left Bank, along the rue Notre-Dame-des-Champs and near the École des Beaux-Arts and the Académie Julian's headquarters. Although some lived in Paris for long periods—even the rest of their lives—most insisted on identifying themselves as American.

=== 20th to 21st Century ===
==== World War I and the Aftermath ====
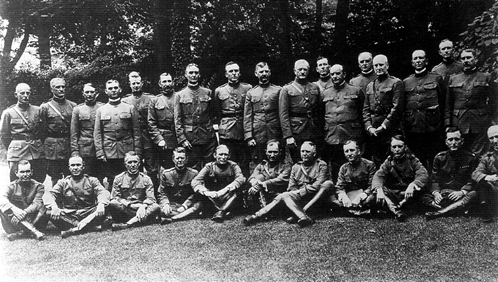
Officers of the American Expeditionary Forces and the Baker mission

During the United States campaigns in World War I the American Expeditionary Forces fought in France alongside British and French allied forces in the last year of the war, against Imperial German forces. The first 14,000 U.S. infantry troops landed in France at the port of Saint Nazaire and by May 1918 over one million U.S. troops were stationed in France, half of them being on the front lines.

In the aftermath of World War I, when about 200,000 were brought over to fight, Paris began to have an African-American community. Ninety per cent of these soldiers were from the American South. France was viewed by many African Americans as a welcome change after incidents of racism in the United States. Beginning in the 1920s, U.S. intellectuals, painters, writers, and tourists were drawn to French art, literature, philosophy, theatre, cinema, fashion, wines, and cuisine. It was during this time that jazz was introduced to the French and black culture was born in Paris.

==== American expatriates in Paris, 1918–1940 ====
With the defeat and dismantling of Austria at the end of World War I, Paris replaced Vienna as the cultural capital of Europe, if not of the world. Many foreigners settled in Paris during this period, some briefly and some long-term, some exiles and some voluntary, because of Paris's tolerance for unorthodox sexuality, politics, and art. The movement built on itself, as the more intellectuals and artists moved to Paris, the more attraction it had for others. Among the Americans living in Paris during this period are Paul Bowles, Aaron Copland, Ernest Hemingway, Henry Miller, Ezra Pound, Gertrude Stein, and Alice B. Toklas.

==== World War II ====
When France officially declared war on Germany in September 1939, as a response to the Third Reich's invasion of Poland, an estimated 30,000 Americans lived in or near Paris. Although that declaration was followed by roughly nine-months of what often was called the "phony war" or "drôle de guerre," the inevitability of coming conflict led most of those expatriates to leave France while they could.

In June 1940, the inevitable occurred with massive German attacks and after scarcely three weeks of battle, Nazi troops marched uncontested through the gates of Paris and some 5,000 Americans still were in the French capital. For various reasons, such as family ties and professional obligations, they had chosen to remain in Paris. At that moment, the United States was not at war, however, and not militarily allied with anyone. It was still a neutral nation. German occupying forces were legally obligated to treat U.S. citizens better than French nationals even though many were bi-nationals with French passports as well as American ones.

Americans who stayed in the capital endured most of the shortages and hardships of their French neighbors but to some extent for nearly a year and a half they were not imprisoned by German occupying authorities. However, their lives were not easy and often tragic, in particular for African-Americans and Jewish Americans who were frequently singled out by the Nazis for harsher than normal treatment. Because the United States still remained neutral, the German occupying forces at first allowed long-standing institutions in the French capital such as the American hospital, the American library, the American church, the American Chamber of Commerce as well as various others of a commercial or charitable nature to remain open.

When the United States entered the war, it led to a clamp down on U.S. citizens in German-occupied northern France. Many were rounded up and sent to internment camps. Those who were not still were obligated to report regularly to German occupying authorities or French police. Internments applied initially only to men although, in September, 1942, German authorities began to intern American women as well.

==== Aftermath of the War to Present Day ====
Many American students have been flocking to France for further education following the aftermath of the Second World War. In 2007–2008, more than 17,000 Americans studied in France as undergraduate and graduate students, a number which represented a 46 percent increase since 2001.

== Religion ==
The American Church in Paris is the first American church established outside the United States. It started in 1814, when American Protestants started worshipping together in different homes around Paris. The first sanctuary was built in 1857, on rue de Berri. The American Church continues to minister to many Anglophone Protestants in Paris, both American and other English speaking communities, with multicultural programming, and a congregation of over nearly 40 nations and 35 Christian denominations.

Similarly, American Cathedral in Paris has served the American community since the 1830s, when services were organized in the garden pavilion of the Hôtel Matignon. A parish was formally established in 1859 and the first church building consecrated in 1864 on Rue Bayard.

== Education ==
Every year, some 17,000 American students travel to Paris, France to spend a semester or an academic year abroad, hundreds more participate in the Teaching Assistant Program in France, and still others go to France to work or to study independently of an American university program.

The American School of Paris, founded in 1946 shortly after the end of World War II, is the oldest American school in Europe. The school provides an American model of education to students from nearly 50 nations, 50% being American. Instruction is in English, and all students study French, either as a first or second language.

The American Graduate School in Paris is a not-for-profit organization and it is recognized in France by the Ministry of Higher Education as a private institution of Higher Learning, and offers programs that are accredited in the United States.

There is also the American School of Grenoble.

== Notable people ==
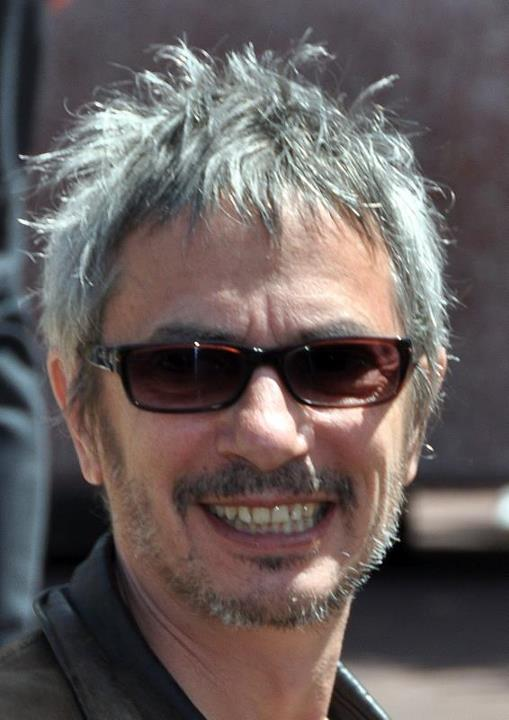
Leos Carax

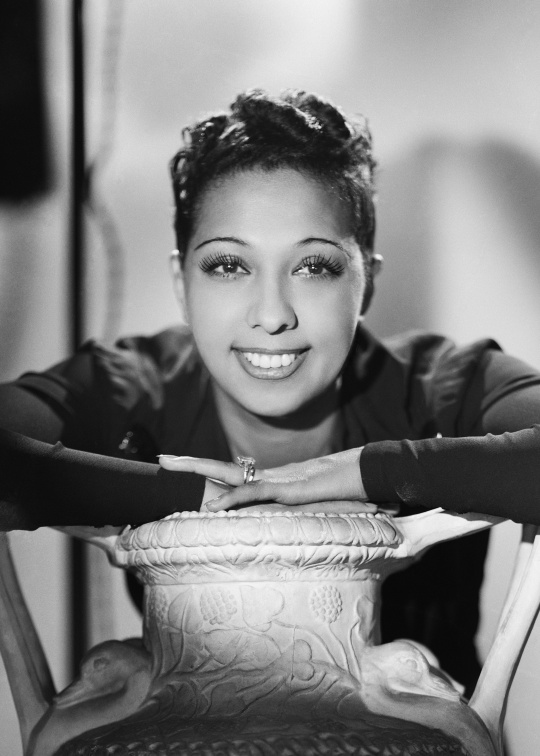
Joséphine Baker

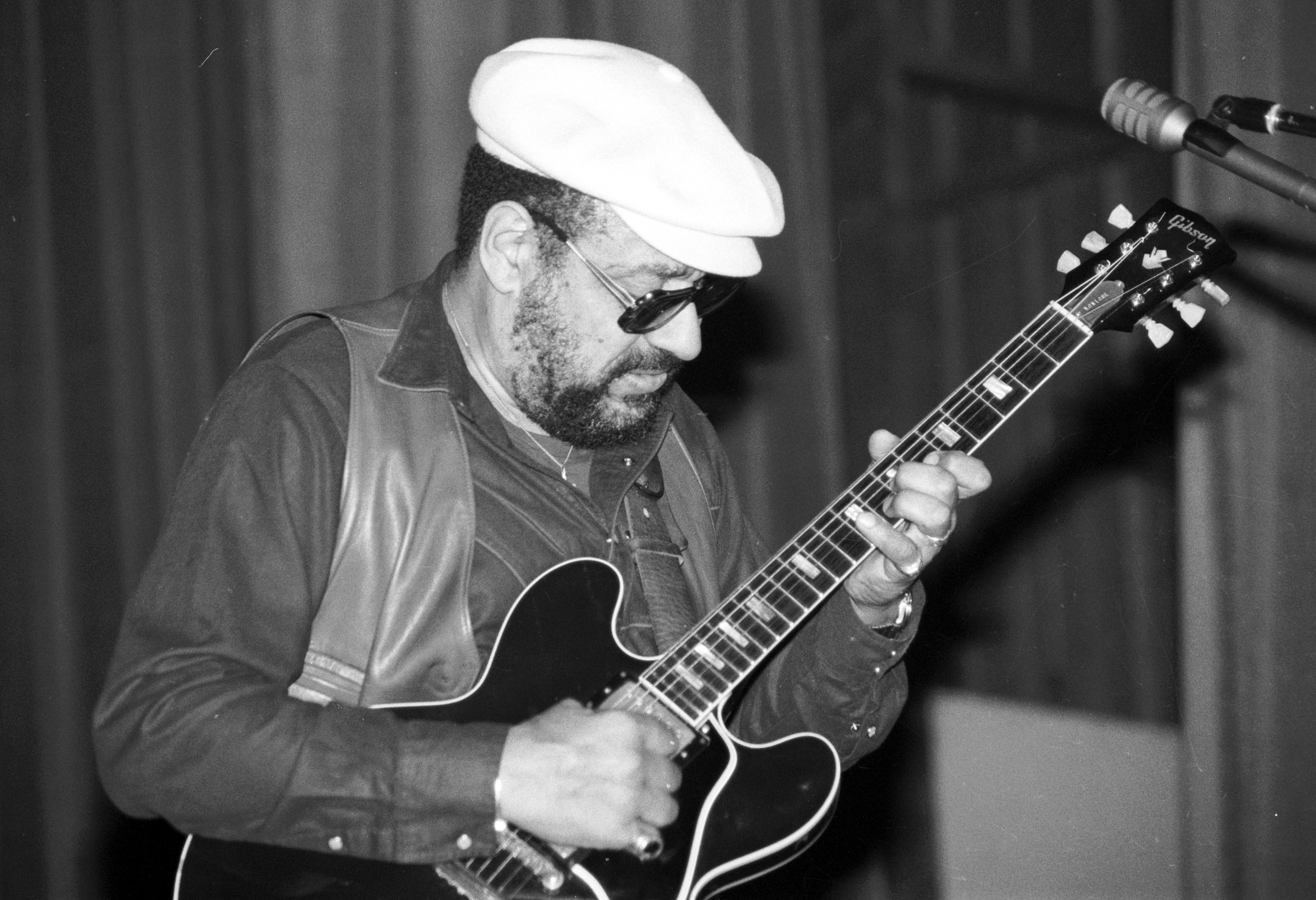
Mickey Baker

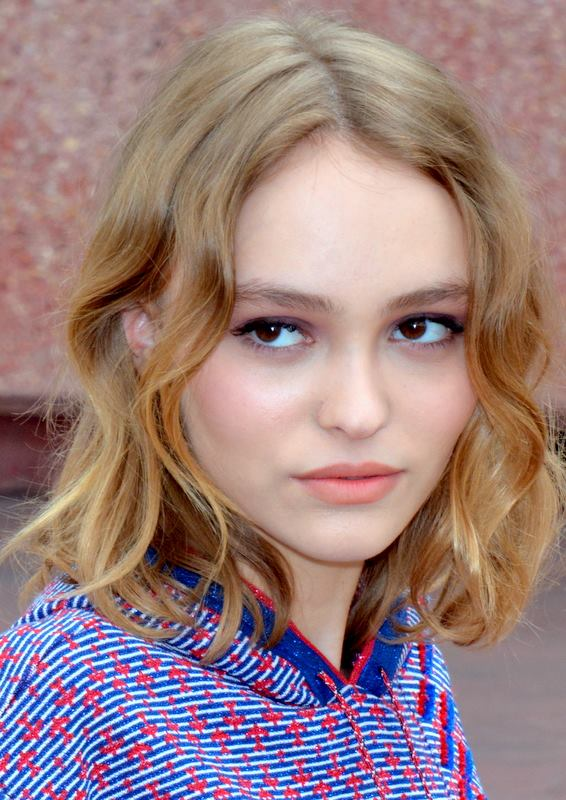
Lily-Rose Depp

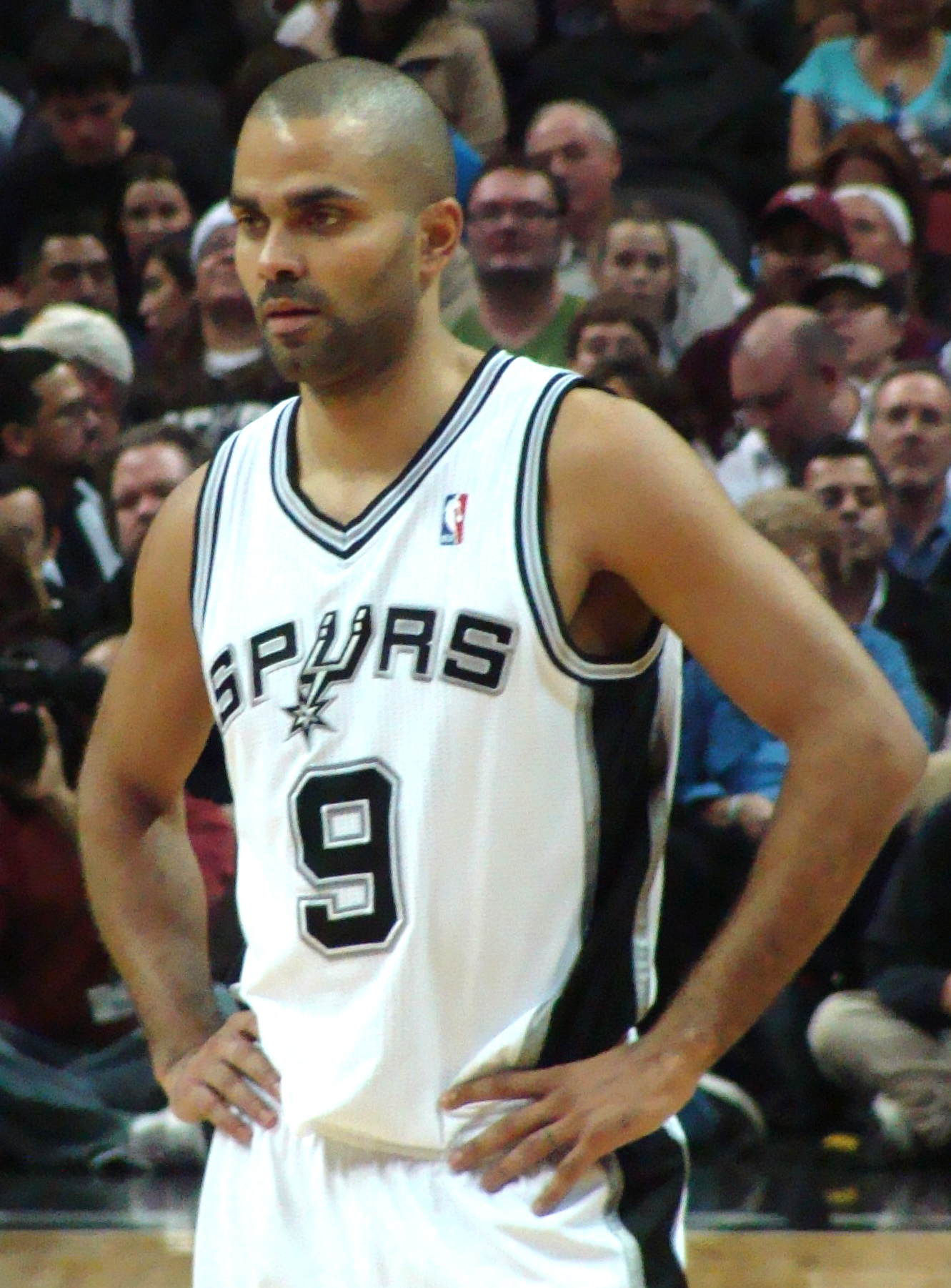
Tony Parker

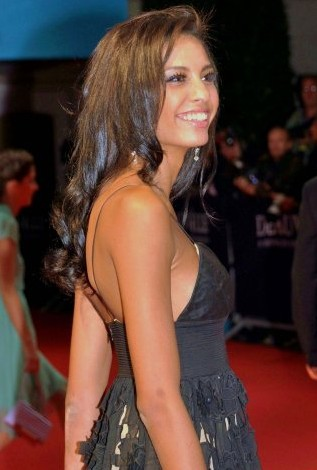
Chloé Mortaud

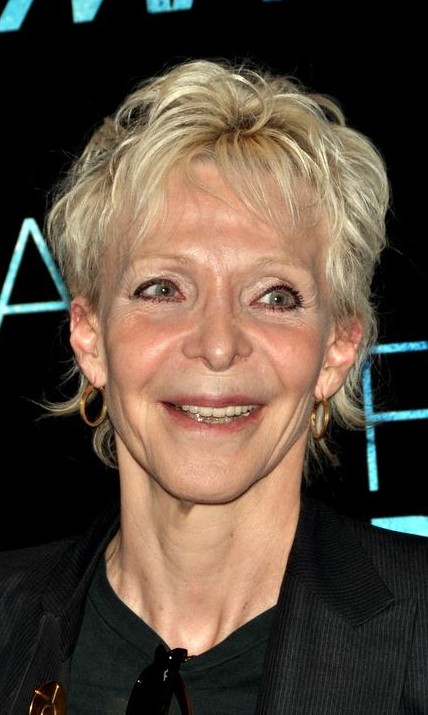
Tonie Marshall

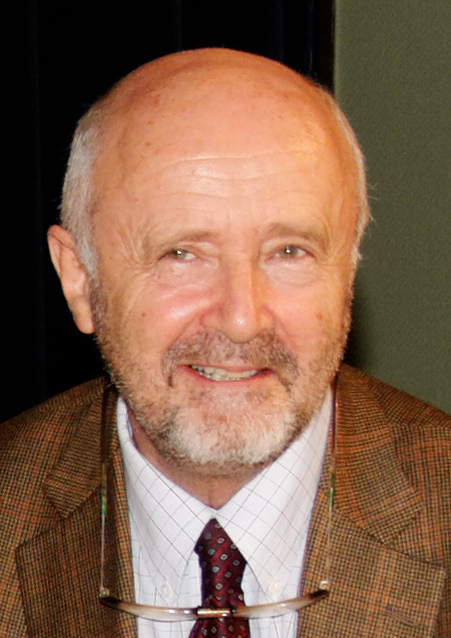
Brice Lalonde

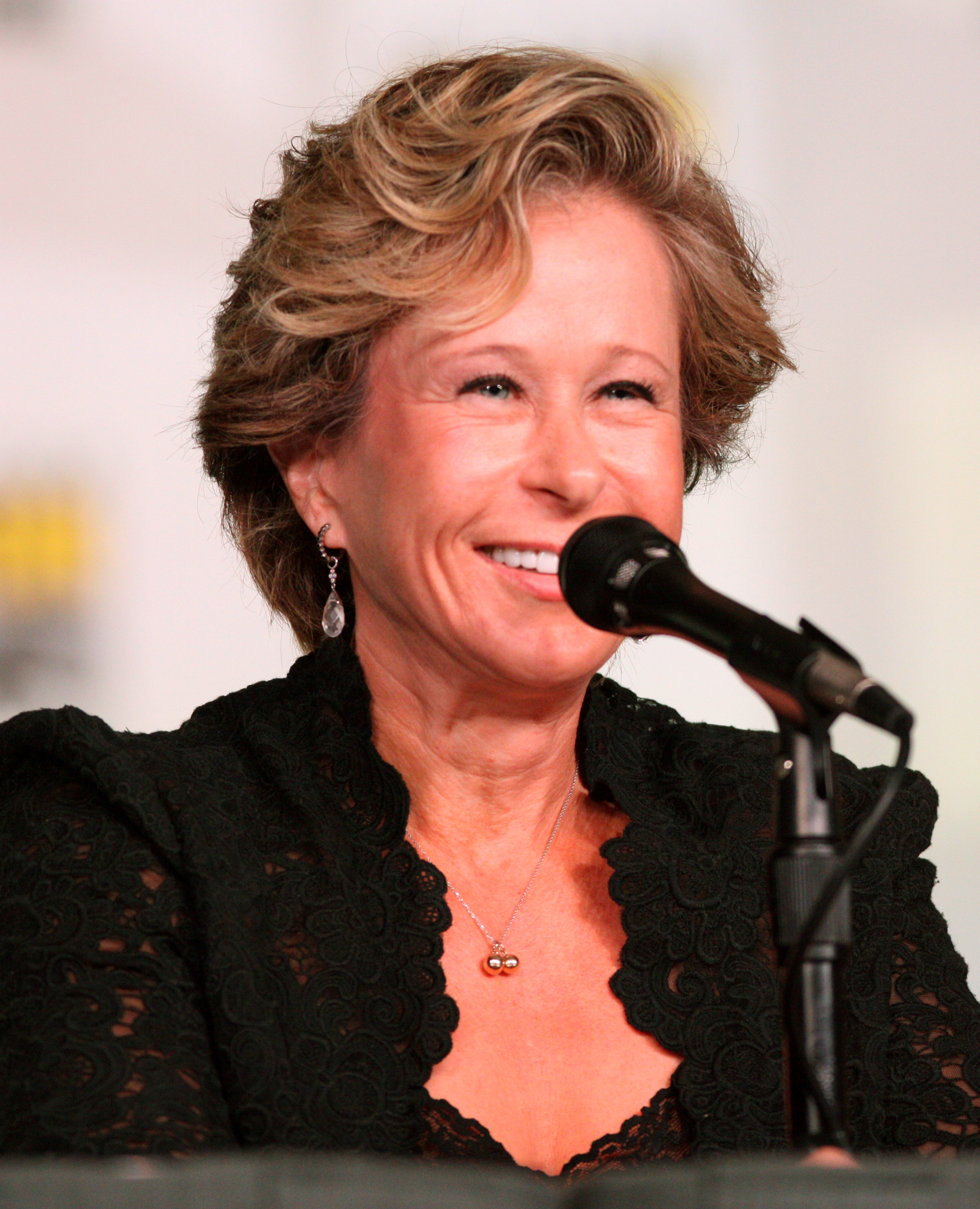
Yeardley Smith

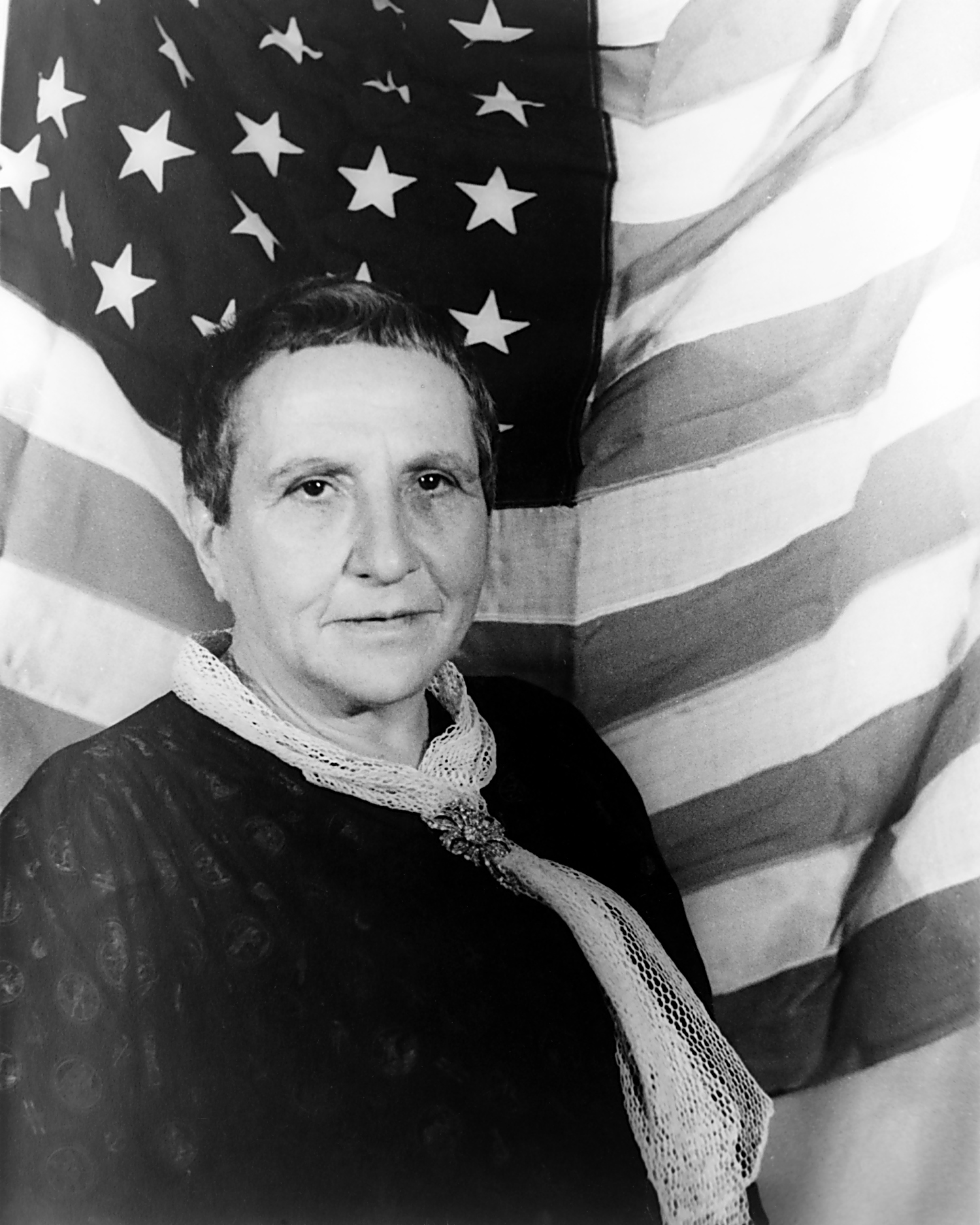
Gertrude Stein

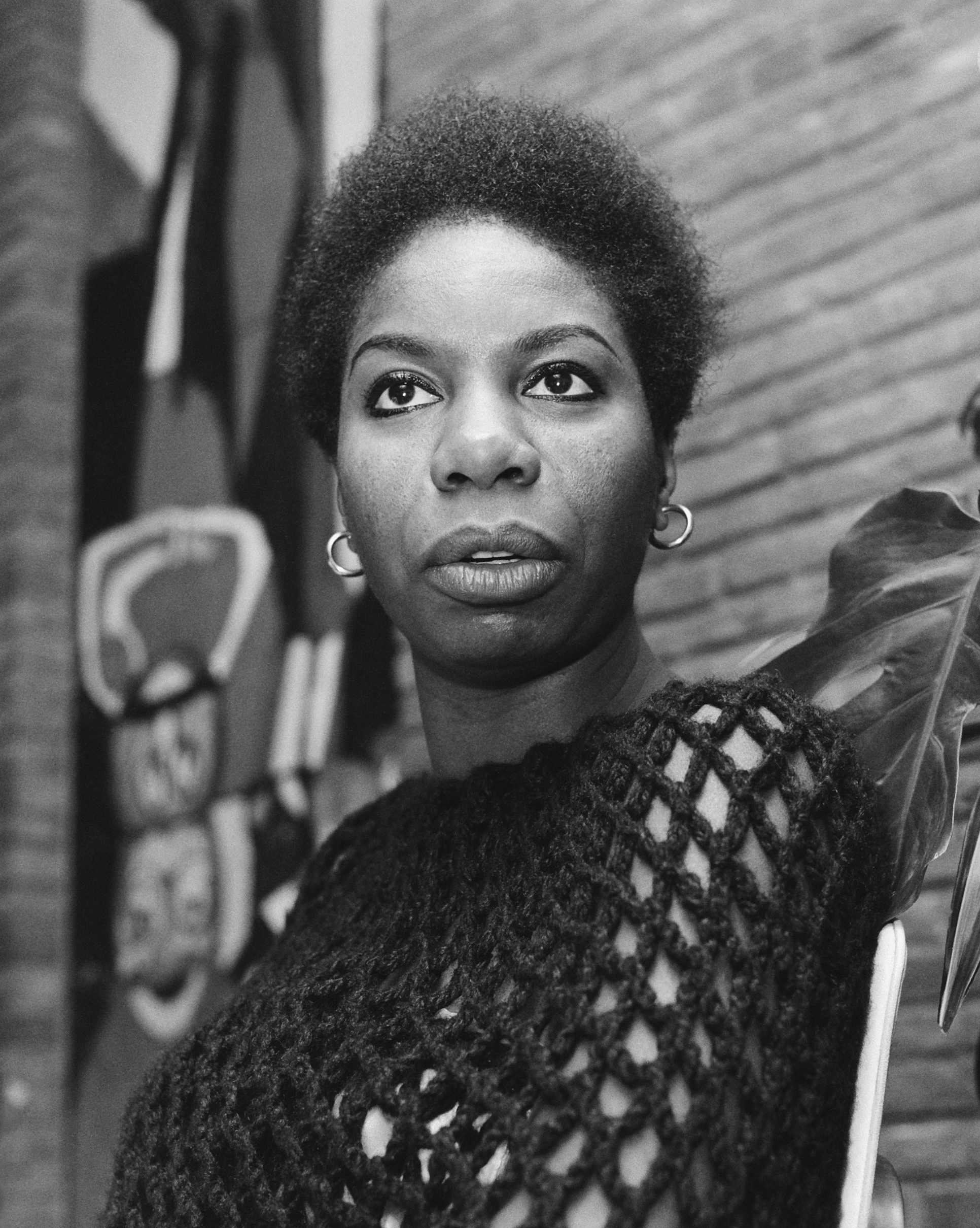
Nina Simone

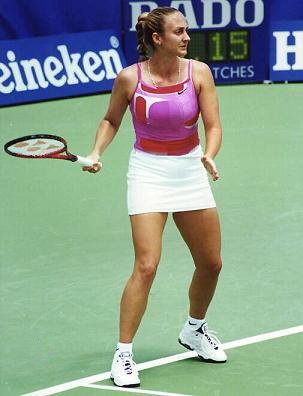
Mary Pierce

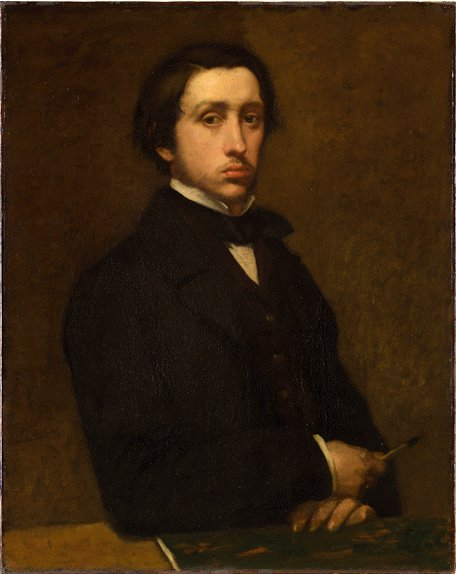
Edgar Degas

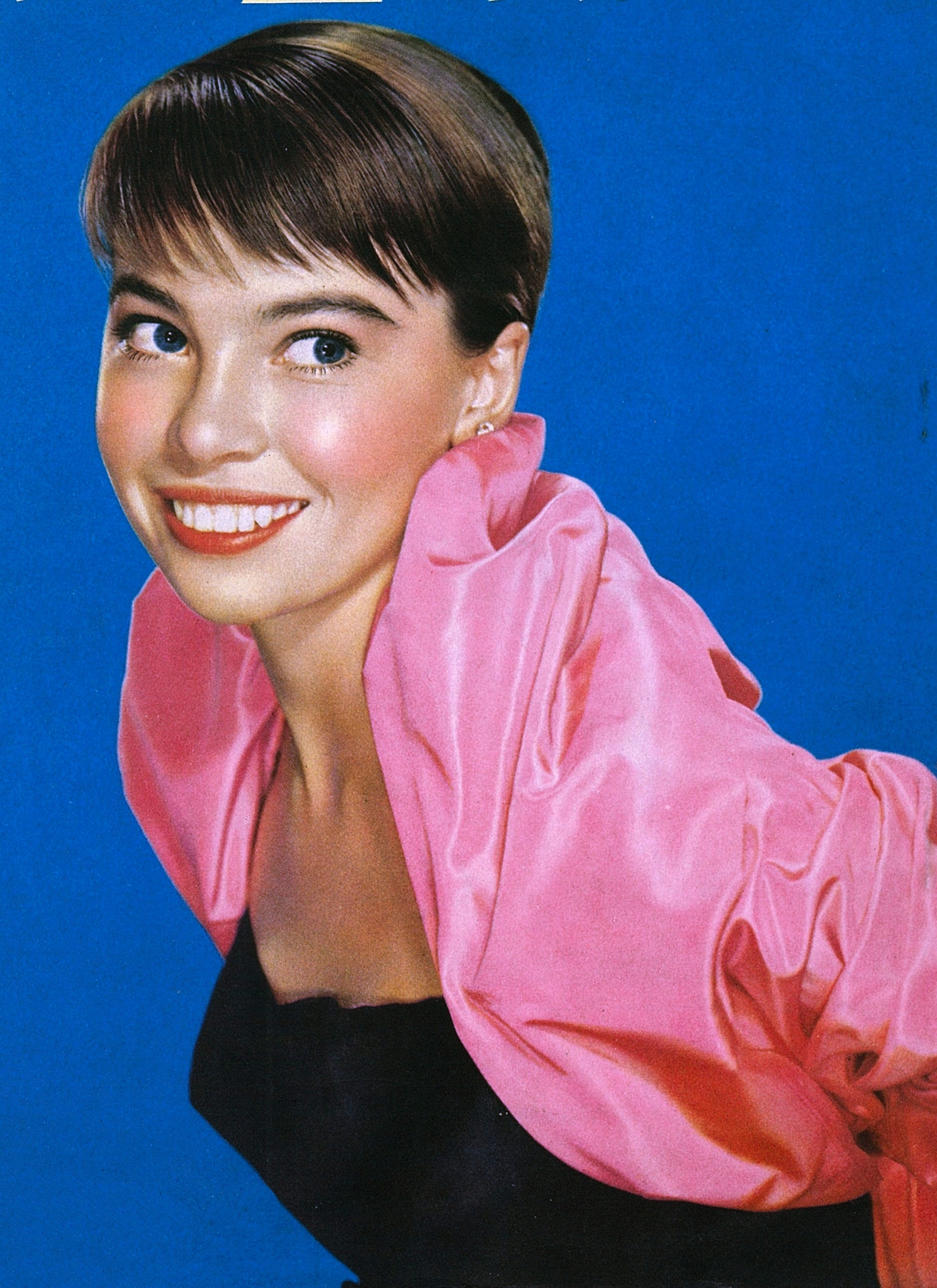
Leslie Caron

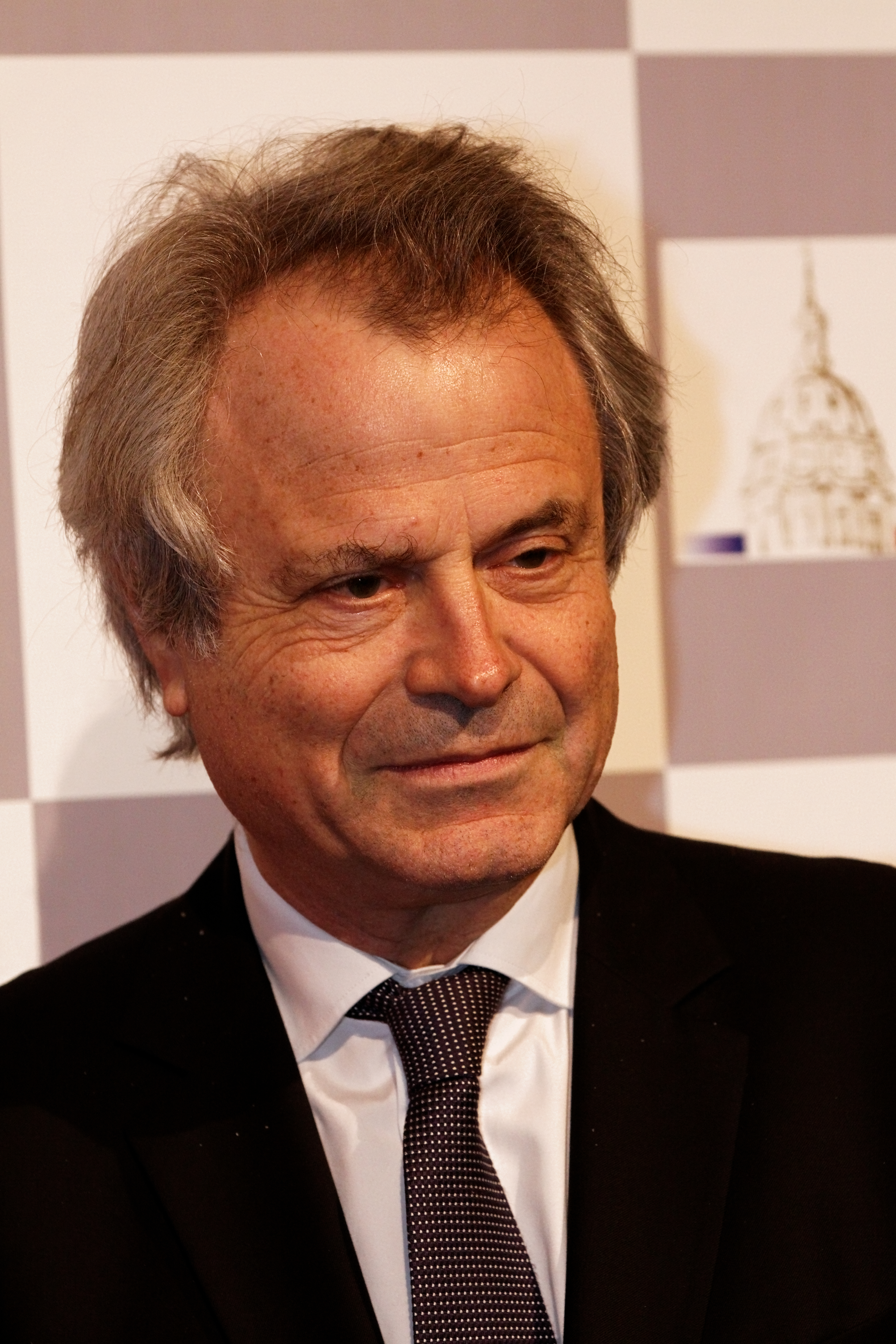
Franz-Olivier Giesbert

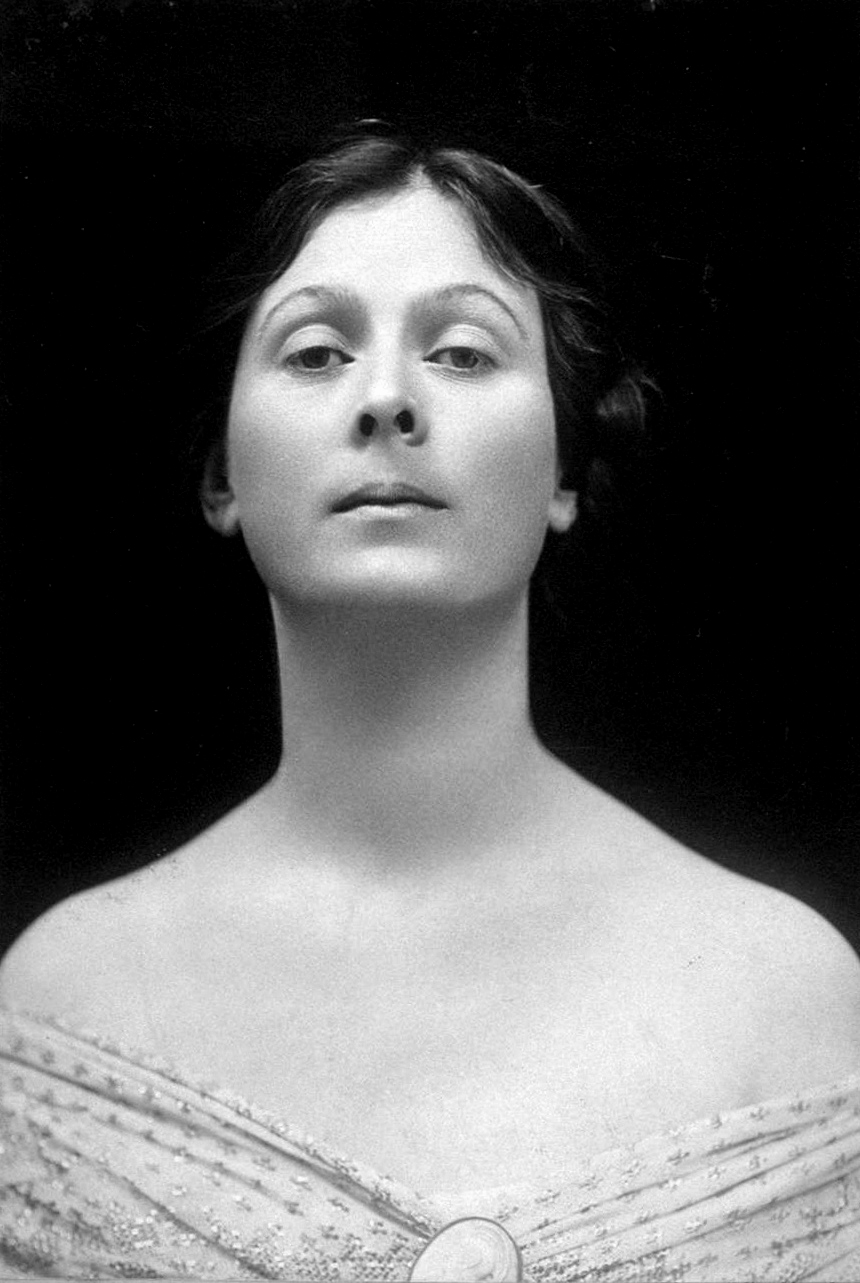
Isadora Duncan

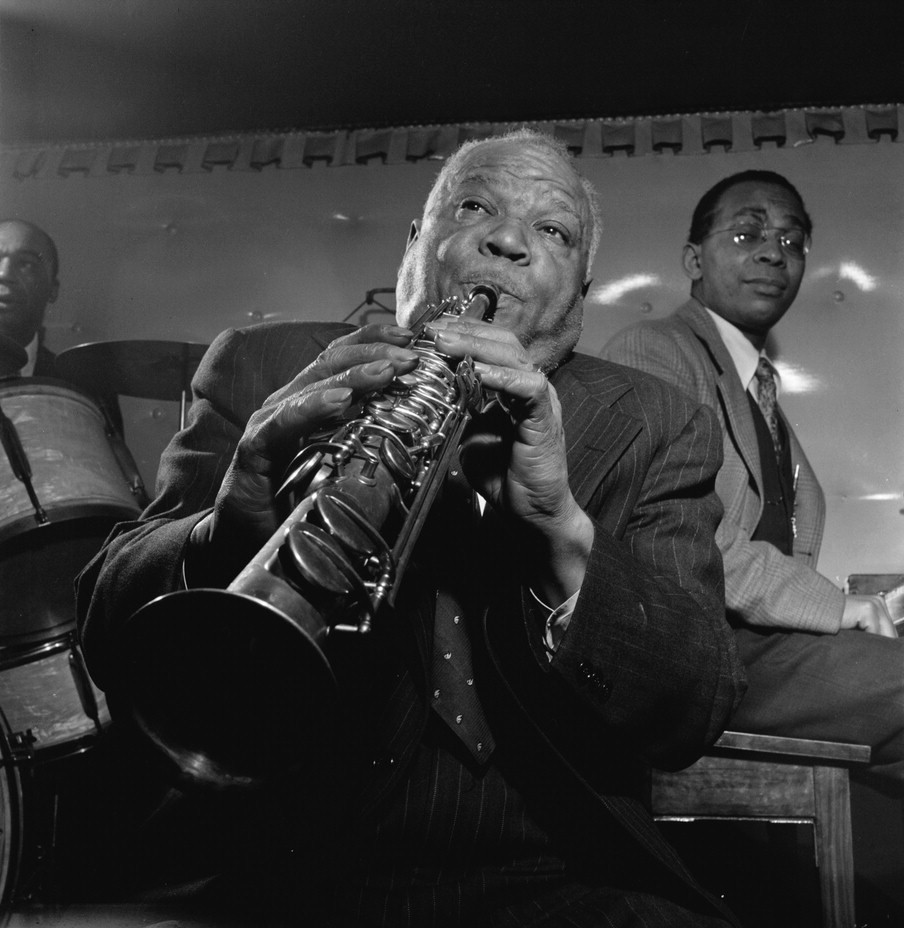
Sidney Bechet

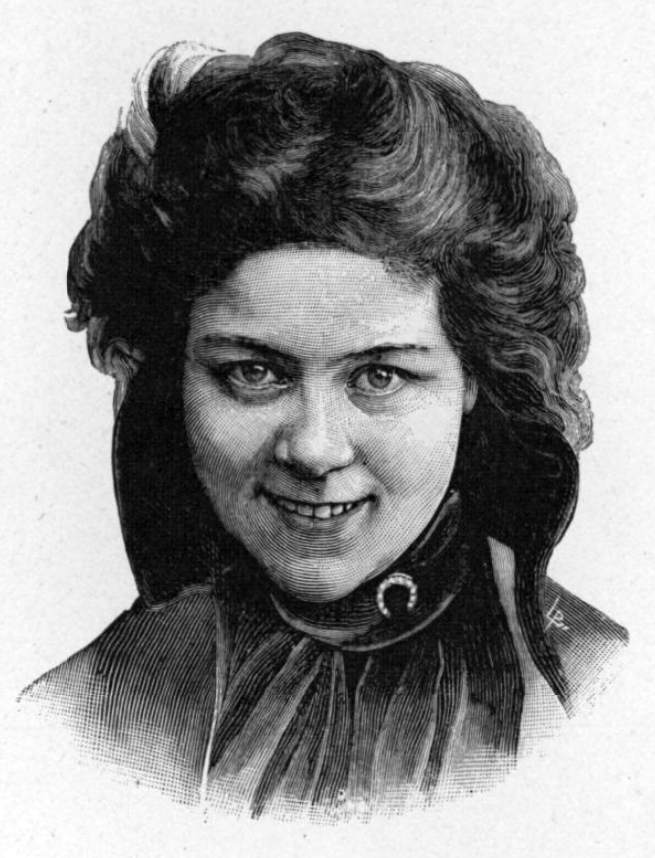
Loie Fuller

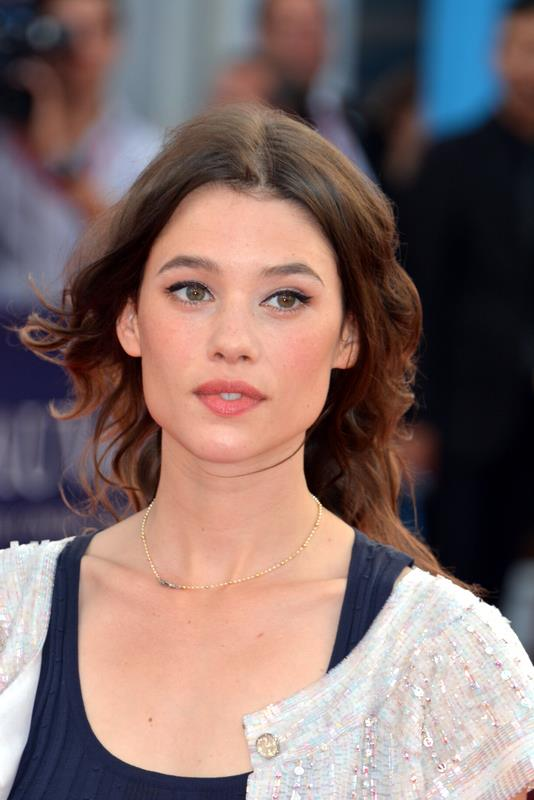
Àstrid Bergès-Frisbey

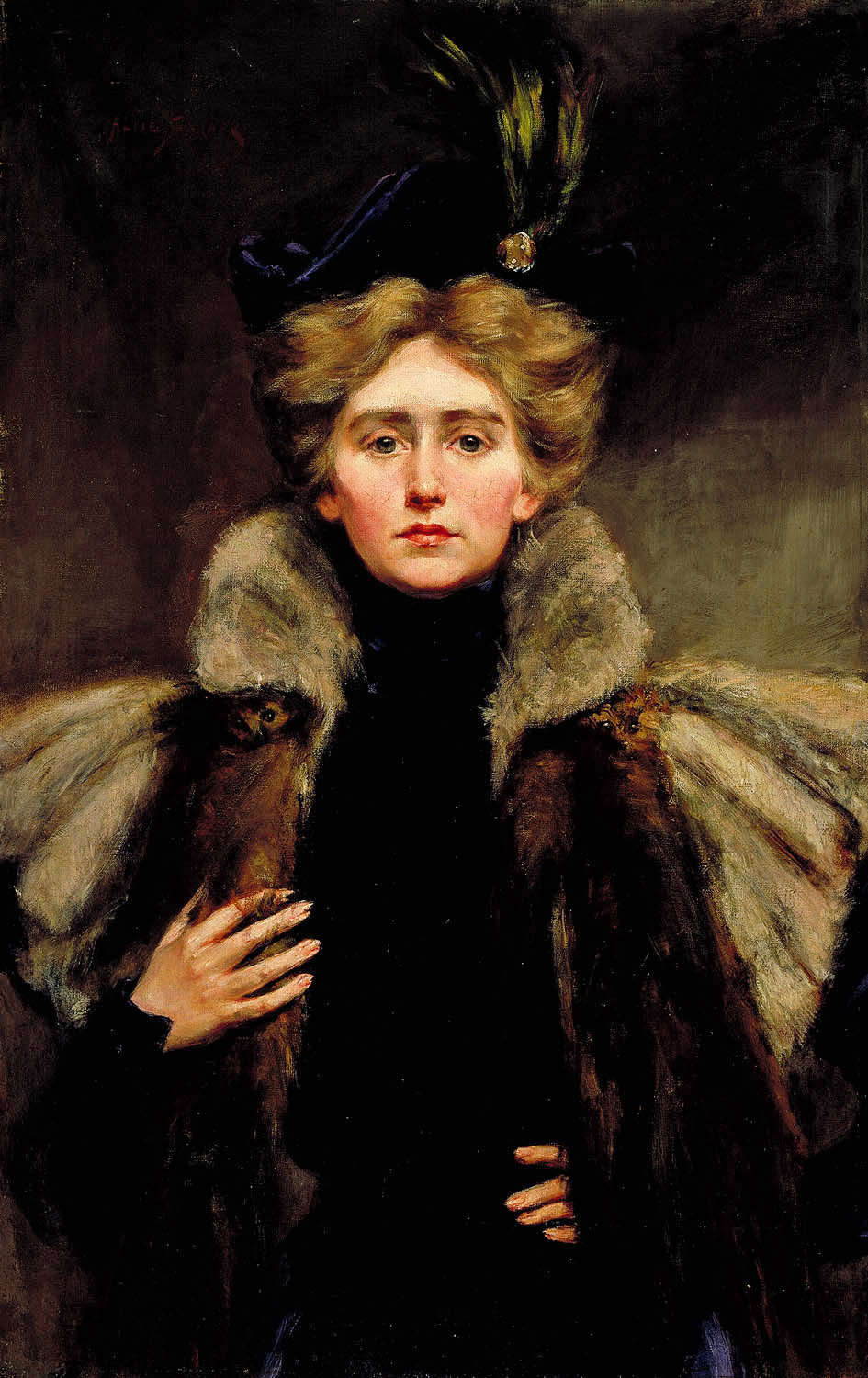
Natalie Clifford Barney

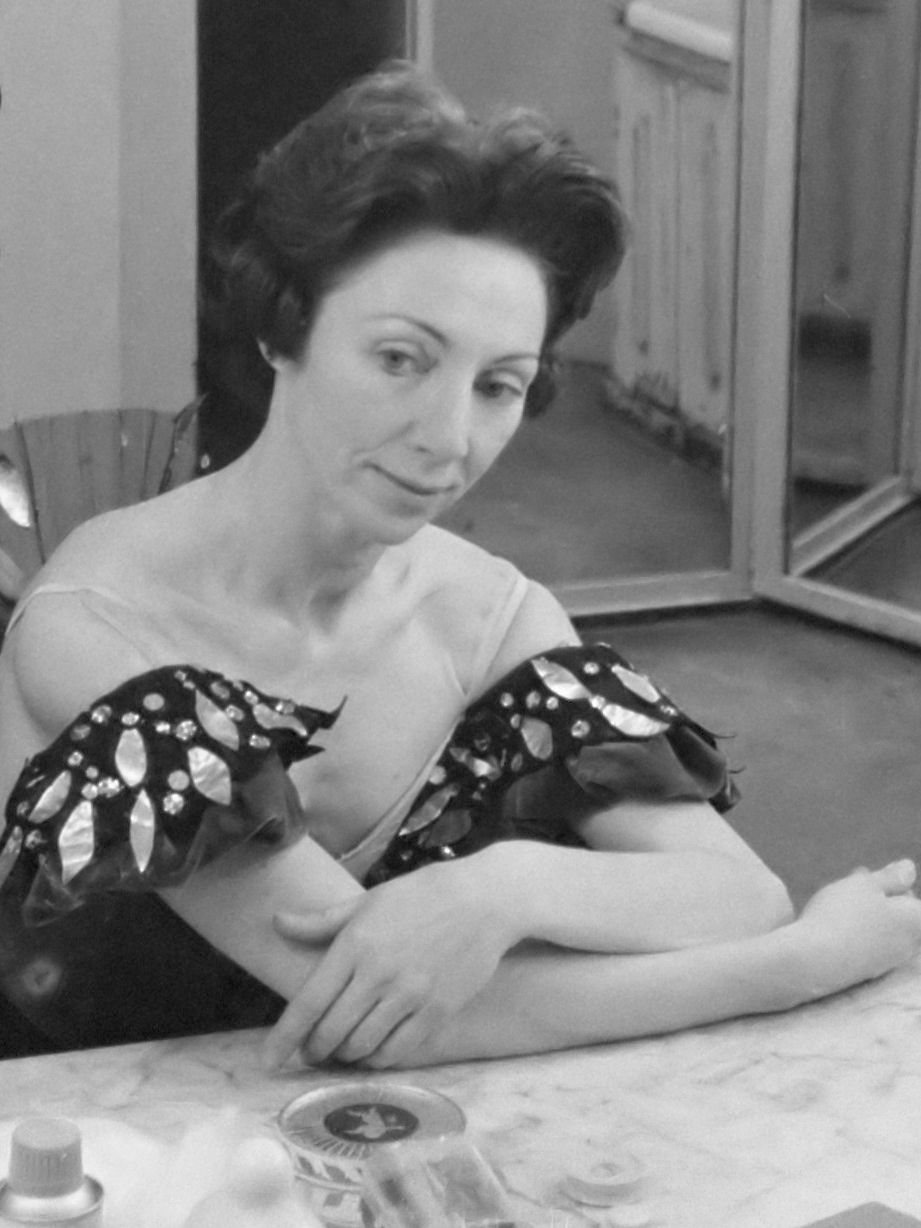
Rosella Hightower

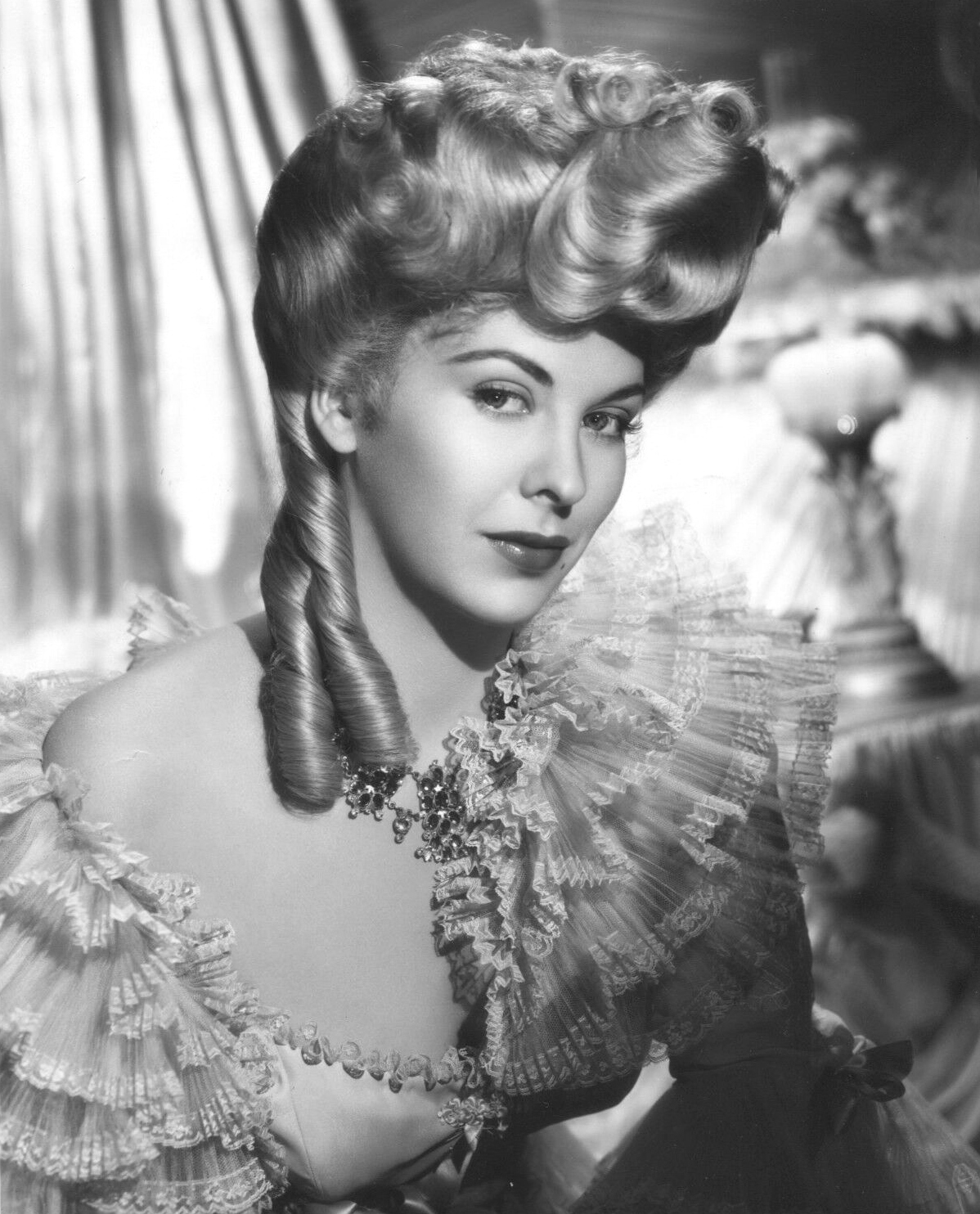
Andrea King

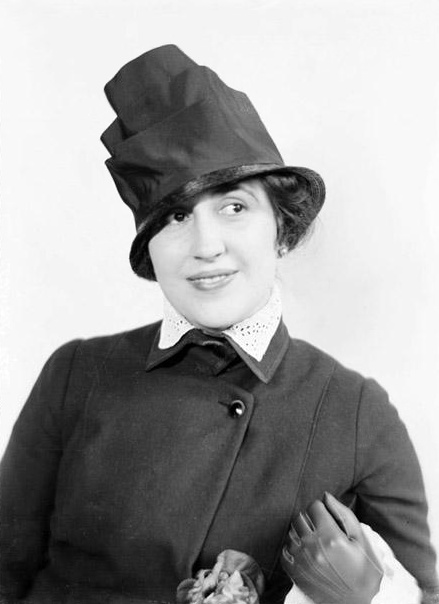
Rita Jolivet

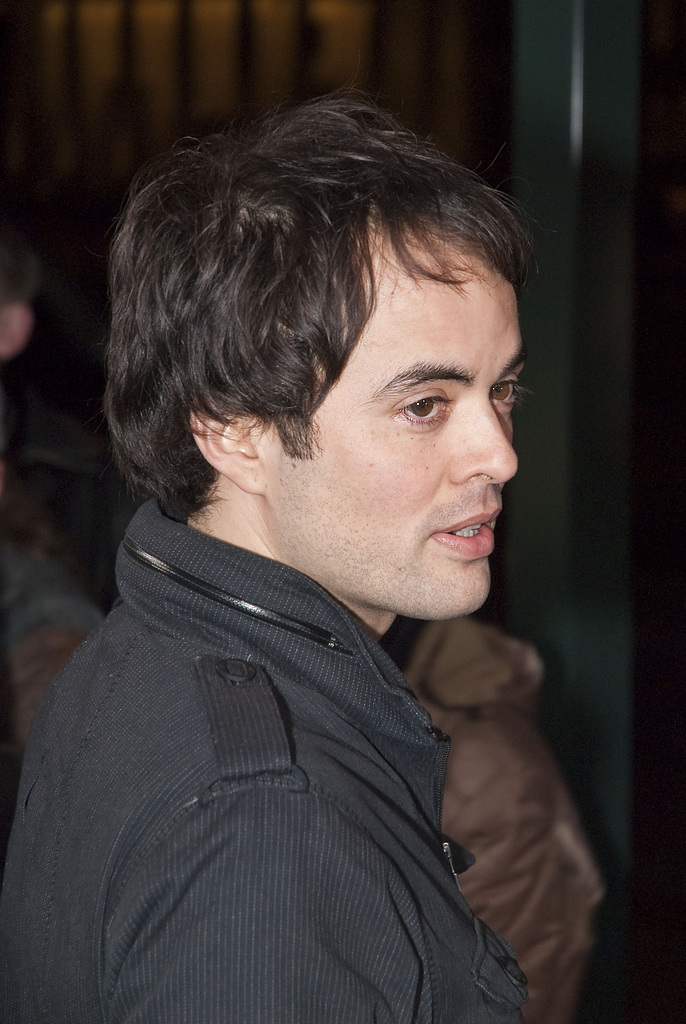
Nikolai Kinski

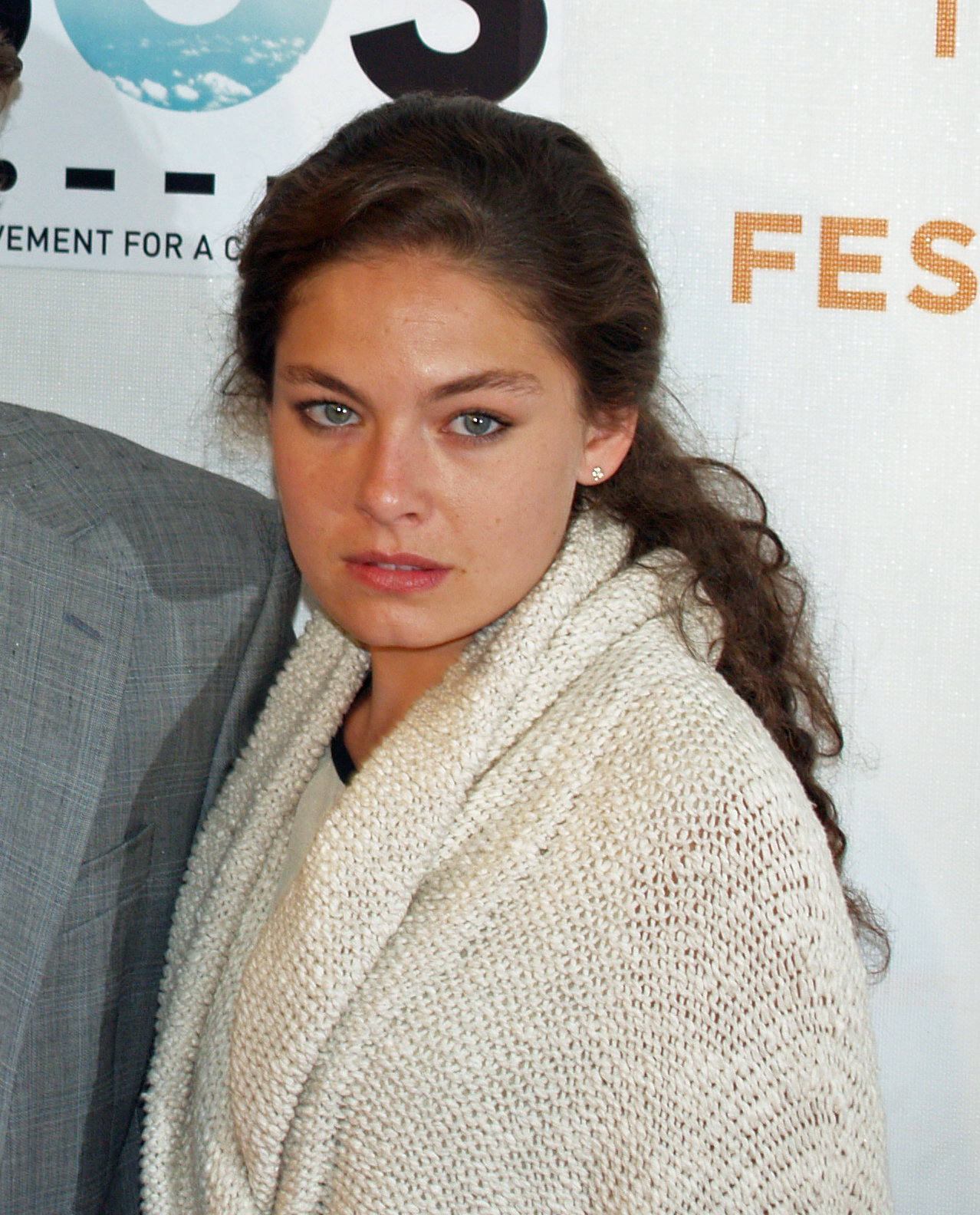
Alexa Davalos

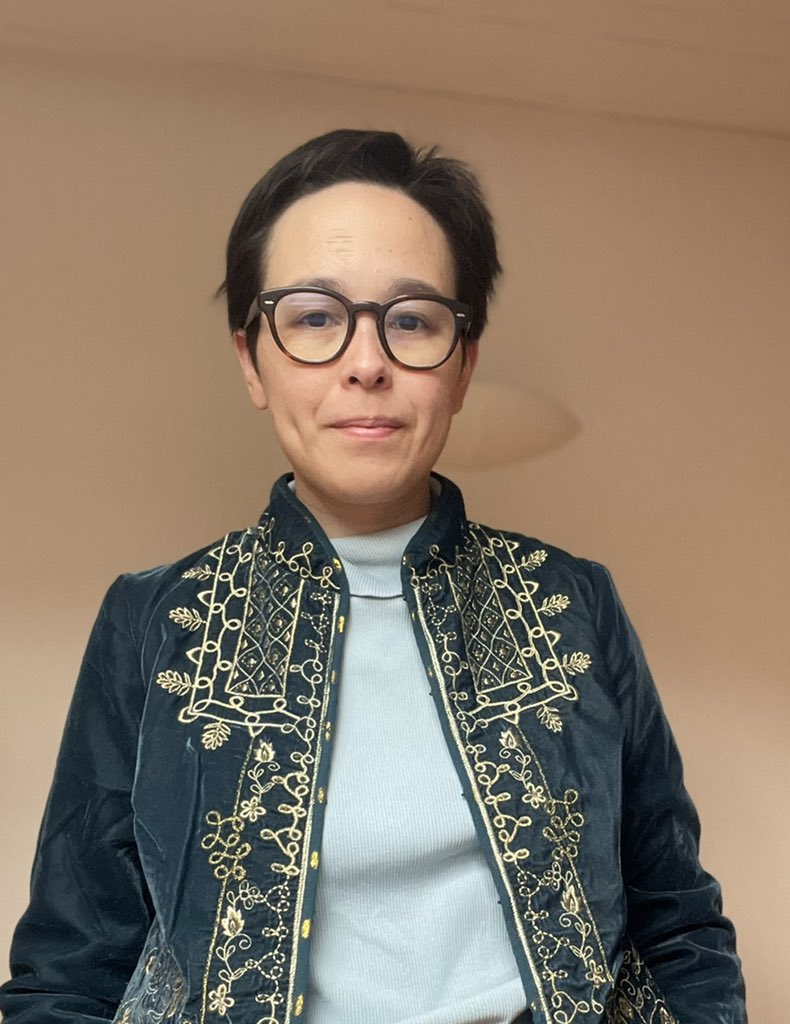
Aliette de Bodard

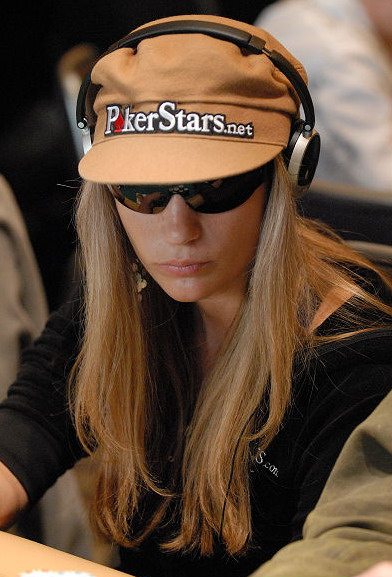
Vanessa Rousso

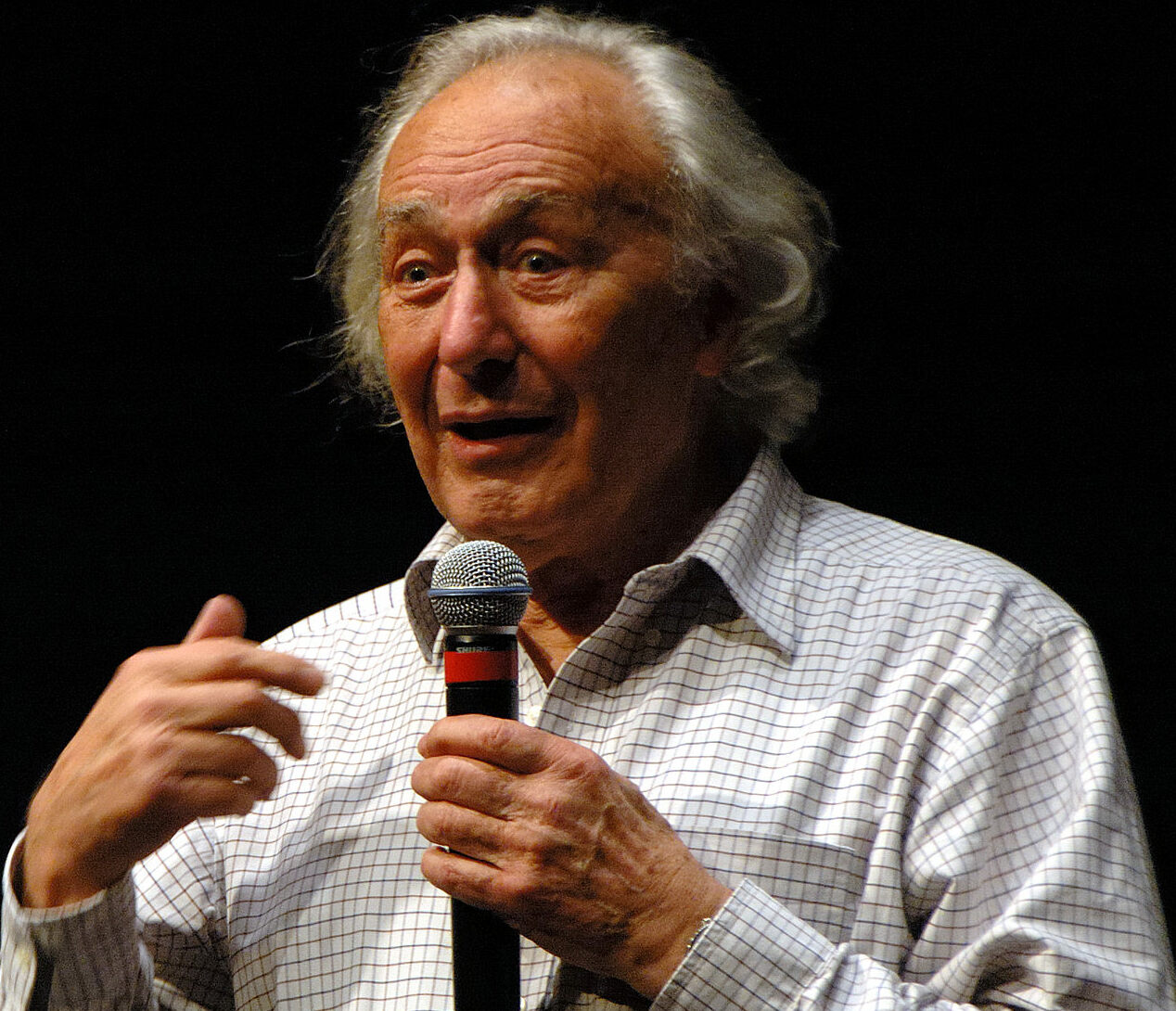
William Klein

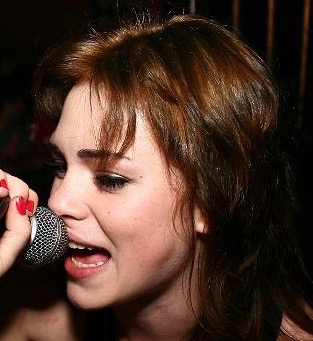
Uffie

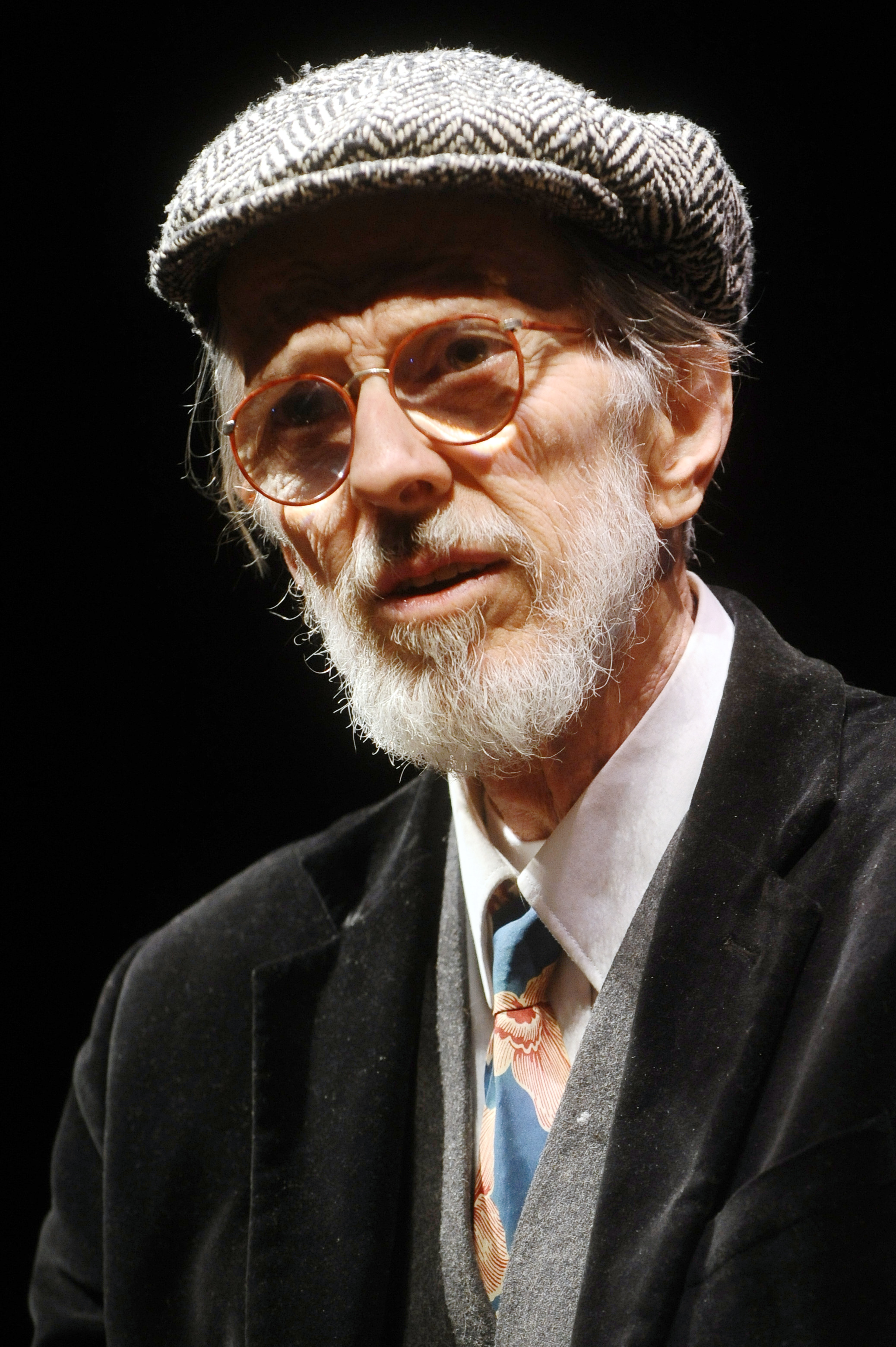
Robert Crumb

== See also ==
- American Cathedral in Paris during World War II
- Quebec French
- Black Haitians
- Haitian Americans
- Canadians in France
- France–United States relations
- French Americans
- African Americans in France
- Haiti–United States relations
