= The International School of Sanya =

- 海南三亚外籍人员子女学校

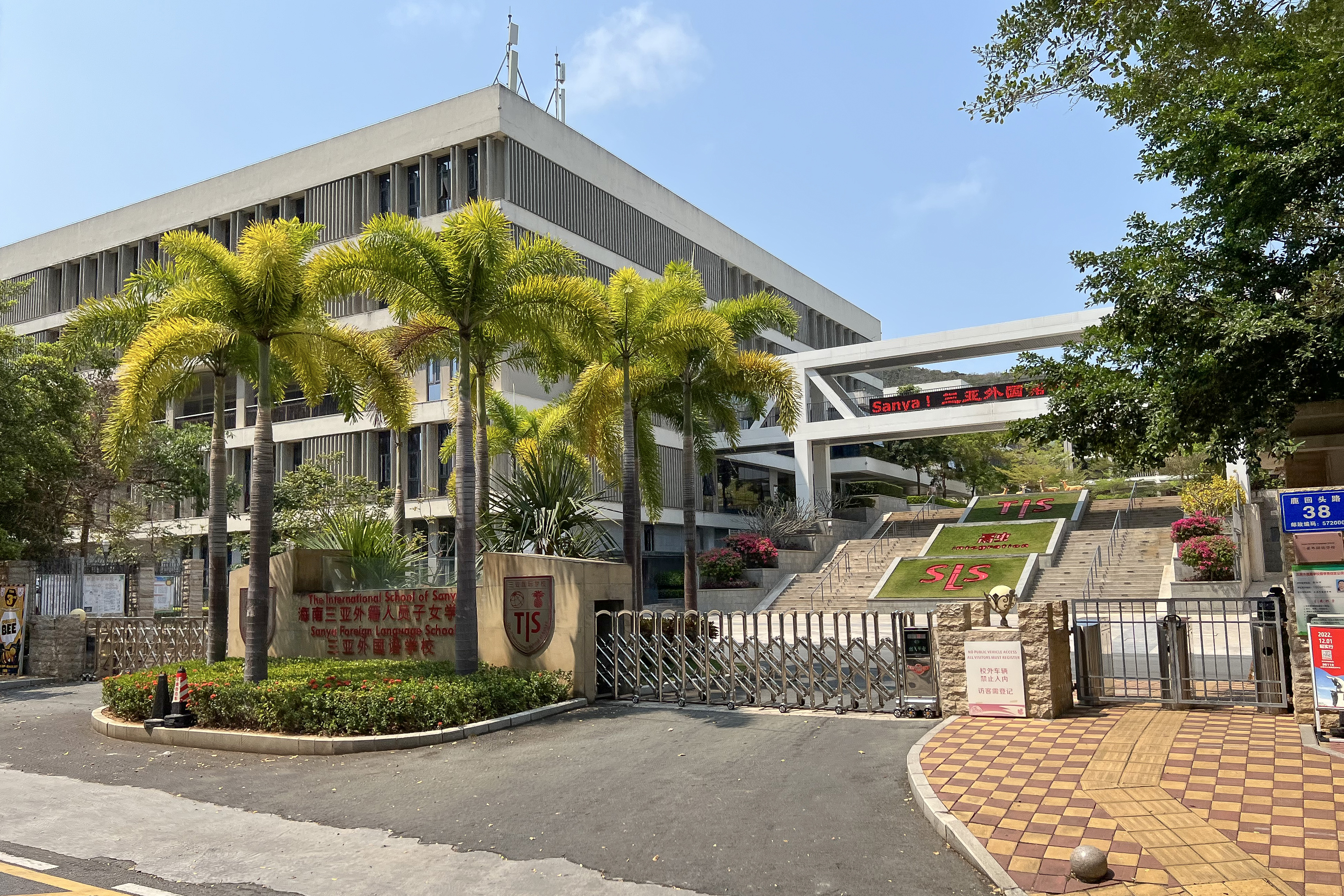

Location
- 38 Luhuitou Road, Jiyang District; Sanya, Hainan, 572000; China; 18.2067°N 109.4804°E

Information
- Type: Private international school
- Established: 2014; 12 years ago
- Principal: Mark Xing
- Education system: Cambridge International
- Team name: Sharks
- Accreditation: Cambridge International Education
- Affiliation: Haiya Education
- Website: www.hye-sanya.com/en

The International School of Sanya (TIS; Chinese: 三亚国际学校 or 海南三亚外籍人员子女学校) is an international school in Sanya, Hainan, China. It is located on Luhuitou Road in Jiyang District on the Banshan Peninsula.

The school is part of Haiya Education and is an authorised Cambridge International School accredited by Cambridge Assessment International Education. It follows the Cambridge International Curriculum and has international teaching staff, including educators from the United Kingdom, the United States, and Canada.

According to Haiya Education, TIS was established in 2014 and provides nine-year education for eligible international students. Its core academic programme includes English, Chinese, Mathematics, Science, and Global Perspectives.

The school was originally named the Canadian International School of Sanya (CIS; 三亚加拿大国际学校) before becoming known as The International School of Sanya.

TIS shares access to Haiya Education campus facilities, including classrooms, laboratories, a library, an indoor stadium, a swimming pool, a football field, and tennis courts. Extracurricular activities offered through Haiya Education include arts, music, sport, chess, language enrichment, and mathematical thinking activities.

== See also ==
- Canadians in China
