= Americans in Haiti =

Ethnic group in Haiti

Total population
- 18,000

Regions with significant populations
- Port-au-Prince, Saint-Marc.

Languages
- American English · Haitian Creole, French

Religion
- Protestantism · Roman Catholicism · Mormonism · Judaism

Related ethnic groups
- African Americans · Canadians in Haiti

American Haitians (French: Américain Haïtien; Haitian Creole: Ameriken Ayisyen) comprise the descendants of free blacks from the United States to Haiti in the early 19th century as well as recent immigrants and expatriates as well as their locally born descendants. At the time of the 2010 Haiti earthquake, there were about 45,000 US citizens living in Haiti.

== History ==
=== 19th century ===
During the antebellum era, many free blacks emigrated to Haiti. Although a few emigrants left for Haiti during the 1810s, it was not until 1824 that with the support of the Haitian President Jean-Pierre Boyer that emigration from the United States increased. Several thousand free blacks left for Haiti in the summer of 1824 and the flow continued until 1826 when the Haitian government stopped paying and defraying the transportation costs.

In 1859, after Fabre Geffrard overthrew the despotic regime of Emperor Faustin I, there was a renewed debate in the African American community about the merits of emigration to Haiti.

=== 20th and 21st centuries ===
==== U.S. occupation ====
On July 28, 1915, the United States occupied Haiti and about 330 US Marines landed at the capital, Port-au-Prince on the authority of U.S. President Woodrow Wilson to safeguard the interests of U.S. corporations. The occupation ended on August 1, 1934, after Franklin D. Roosevelt reaffirmed an August 1933 disengagement agreement, and the last contingent of U.S. Marines departed on August 15, 1934.

==== The Duvalier era to present day ====
During the Duvalier dictatorship, many American businessmen came to Haiti with their families to start or run the assembly plants that sprang up there.

In recent years, many Americans came to the country to work for international aid and relief agencies on development projects, or at hospitals and feeding stations. Many Haitian Americans have also returned to the country. Hundreds of young children born in New York City or Miami to parents who fled Haiti under the Duvaliers and their successors have chosen to return. The American expatriate community live mostly in Port-au-Prince and maintain a system of neighborhood "wardens" to act as intermediaries with the American embassy in the capital.

== Notable people ==
- Gene H. Bell-Villada – American literary critic, novelist, translator and memoirist.
- James Theodore Holly – Protestant Episcopal missionary bishop of Haiti.
- Flo McGarrell – American artist, filmmaker, writer and arts administrator.
- Kevin Pina – American journalist, filmmaker and educator.
- Prince Saunders – African-American teacher, scholar, diplomat, and author

== See also ==
- Haitian emigration
- Haitian Americans
- Haiti–United States relations
- Canadians in Haiti
