= Canadians in China =

Ethnic group in China

Canadians in China 在华加拿大人/在華加拿大人
Total population
- 300,000

Regions with significant populations
- Hong Kong · Beijing · Shanghai

Languages
- Chinese · Canadian English · Canadian French

Religion
- Christianity · Mahayana Buddhism · Other

Related ethnic groups
- Canadian diaspora

Canadians in China consist mainly of expatriates and students from Canada to the People's Republic of China. As of 2011, there are about 300,000 Canadians living in China.

== Hong Kong ==
In February 2011, research from the Asia Pacific Foundation, conducted with Hong Kong Baptist University, suggests there are at least 295,000 Canadians in Hong Kong. Near 85% of Canadians in Hong Kong are Canadian-born, a figure higher than Canada itself (80.2%). This represents the third largest community of Canadians, after Canada itself and the United States. Approximately 95% of Canadians in Hong Kong hold Chinese citizenship as well.

== Mainland China ==
=== Beijing ===
About 10% of Beijing's foreign population of 200,000 are from Canada (20,000). The Canadian diaspora in Beijing is a young and well-educated community and is economically active. A significant number of them include Chinese Canadian returnees who emigrated to Canada in the early 1990s and later returned to China.

=== Shanghai ===
According to local official statistics, the numbers of Canadian citizens residing in Shanghai have increased significantly over the past ten years. In 2000, the city reported 1,361 Canadian citizens living there, representing 2.3% of all foreign residents in the city. By the end of 2009, there are about 6,121 Canadian citizens living in Shanghai.

Shanghai's Canadian community consist mainly of English teachers, media workers, engineers, senior executives, small business owners and house wives as well as international students.

== Education ==
Canadian schools in Mainland China:

- Canadian International School of Beijing
- International School of Beijing (formed out of a merger of the Canadian Embassy School and other embassy schools)
- The International School of Sanya (formerly Canadian International School of Sanya)

Canadian International School of Hong Kong is a Canadian school in Hong Kong.

== Notable people ==
- Norman Bethune — Canadian physician and medical innovator
- Davidson Black — Canadian paleoanthropologist
- Dashan — Freelance performer
- Miodrag Kojadinović — Canadian-Serbian poet
- Dorise Nielsen — Canadian politician and teacher

== See also ==
- Canada–China relations
- Chinese Canadians
