= Canadians in Haiti =

Total population
- 6,000

Regions with significant populations
- Port-au-Prince

Languages
- English · French · Haitian Creole

Religion
- Roman Catholicism · Protestantism · Others

Related ethnic groups
- Canadian diaspora

Canadians in Haiti (French: Canadien Haïtien; Haitian Creole: Kanadyen Ayisyen) consist mainly of expatriates from Canada. According to Canada's Department of Foreign Affairs and International Trade, there are about 6,000 Canadians living in Haiti, but only 700 are registered with the Canadian Embassy in Port-au-Prince.

== Overview ==
Hundreds of Canadians work for aid organizations in Haiti. These organizations include Oxfam Canada, Care Canada, World Vision Canada, Plan Canada and Save the Children.

=== 2010 Haiti earthquake ===
More than 1,415 Canadians went missing and six have been confirmed dead in Haiti in the aftermath of the earthquake that struck the country and devastated Port-au-Prince on January 12, 2010. A total of 100 Canadian citizens had also taken refuge in the compound of the Canadian Embassy in Port-au-Prince.

== See also ==
- Canada–Haiti relations
- Haitian Canadians
- Americans in Haiti
