= Canadians in the United Kingdom =

Ethnic group in the United Kingdom

Total population
- Canadian-born residents in the United Kingdom: 81,484 – 0.1% (2021/22 Census) (Note: Does not include Canadians born in the United Kingdom or those with ancestry rooted in Canada); England: 66,847 – 0.1% (2021); Scotland: 9,920 – 0.2% (2022); Wales: 2,249 – 0.07% (2021); Northern Ireland: 2,468 – 0.1% (2021); 72,518 (2001 Census); Canadian citizens/passports held: 35,161 (England and Wales only, 2021); Other estimates: 82,000 (2009 ONS estimate)

Regions with significant populations
- London · Scotland · South West England

Languages
- Canadian English · Canadian French · British English

Religion
- Catholicism · Anglicanism · Methodism; Judaism · Islam • Protestantism

Related ethnic groups
- Canadian diaspora and British Canadians

Canadians in the United Kingdom, or Canadian Britons, are people from Canada living in the United Kingdom and their descendants. In 2001 some 72,518 people born in Canada were living in the UK according to the UK census. Of the ten census tracts with the highest Canadian-born populations, nine were in London, with the other being Cambridge West. The Office for National Statistics estimates that, in 2009, 82,000 Canadian-born people were living in the UK. In 2011 this was the third largest community in the Canadian diaspora after Canadians in the United States and Canadians in Hong Kong.

== History ==
Britain and especially in London served as the metropole to Canadians of British ancestry for a long time just like other English-speaking people across the Commonwealth — the centre of their cultural and economic world where people would go to advance their careers. This was still true to some extent in the year 1956 when Trinidadian Canadian theatre critic Ronald Bryden arrived in London for the first time looking to find "pure Anglitude" or the true spirit of Englishness, and remarked that the most imperial-looking buildings were the Commonwealth high commissions and those owned by the Canadian banks, the most Anglocentric newspaper was owned by a Canadian, and the best theatre productions starred Canadian actors (in American productions).

== Politics ==
Hamar Greenwood was a Canadian-born politician who served as a cabinet minister in the Lloyd George ministry.

Bonar Law was a Canadian-born politician who served as Prime Minister of the United Kingdom, and additionally held many other government offices including Secretary of State for the Colonies, Chancellor of the Exchequer and Lord Privy Seal.

Lord Beaverbrook was a Canadian-born businessman and politician who served as a cabinet minister in the Churchill ministry during the Second World War.

== See also ==
- Canadian diaspora
- Canada-United Kingdom relations
- American British
- British Canadian
