= American School of Grenoble =

Coordinates: 45.194353°N 5.712070°E

American School of Grenoble is an American international school located in the Cité Scolaire Internationale in Grenoble, France. It serves ages 10–18.

== See also ==
- List of French international schools in the United States and Canada
- American migration to France
