= Canadians in France =

Total population
- 17,000 (2020) – 60,000

Regions with significant populations
- Paris, South of France, Corsica, Aquitaine, Languedoc-Roussillon, Centre-Val de Loire, Midi-Pyrénées, Brittany, Poitou-Charentes, Rhône-Alpes

Languages
- French; Québécois French; Canadian English; Acadian French

Religion
- Multiple denominations; Catholicism; Protestantism; Judaism

Related ethnic groups
- French Canadians, Québécois, Acadians

Canadians in France (French: Canadiens en France) are people born or naturalized in Canada who emigrated to France, especially from French Canada. Those from the province of Québec are sometimes known as Québécois in France (Les Québécois en France). There has also been a recent immigration of Acadians to France.

== Demographics ==
=== Population size ===
The Canadian community in France is estimated at 17,000 Canadians.

== Notable people ==
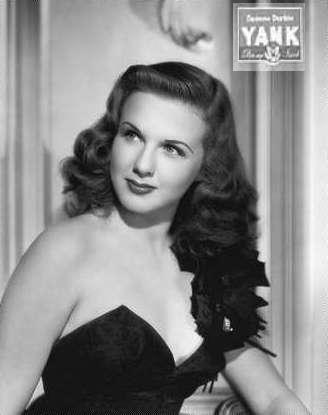
Deanna Durbin

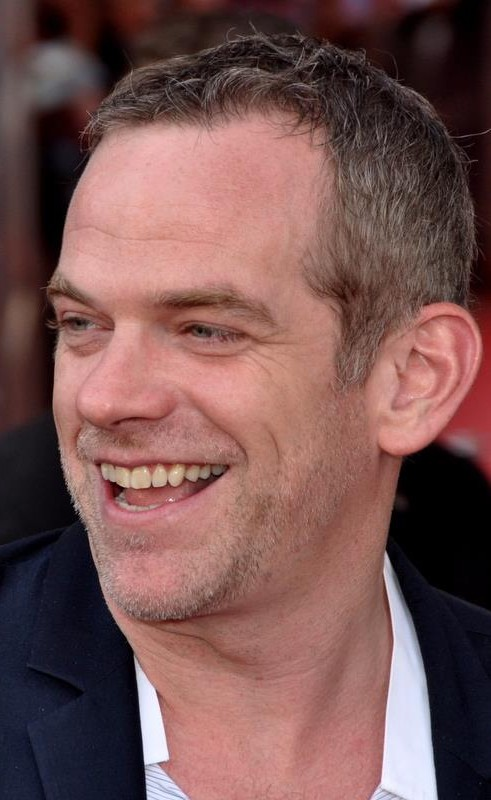
Garou

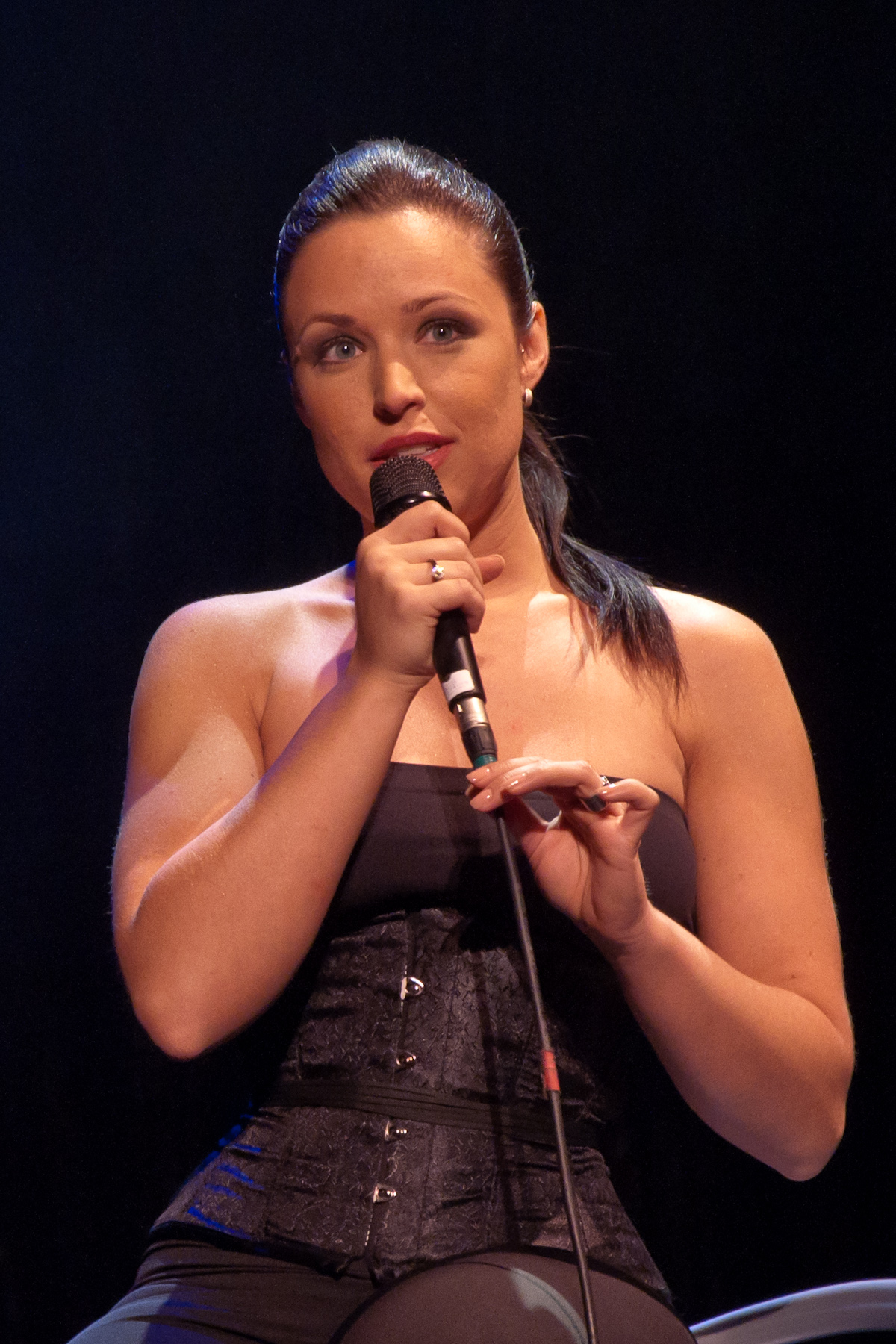
Natasha St-Pier

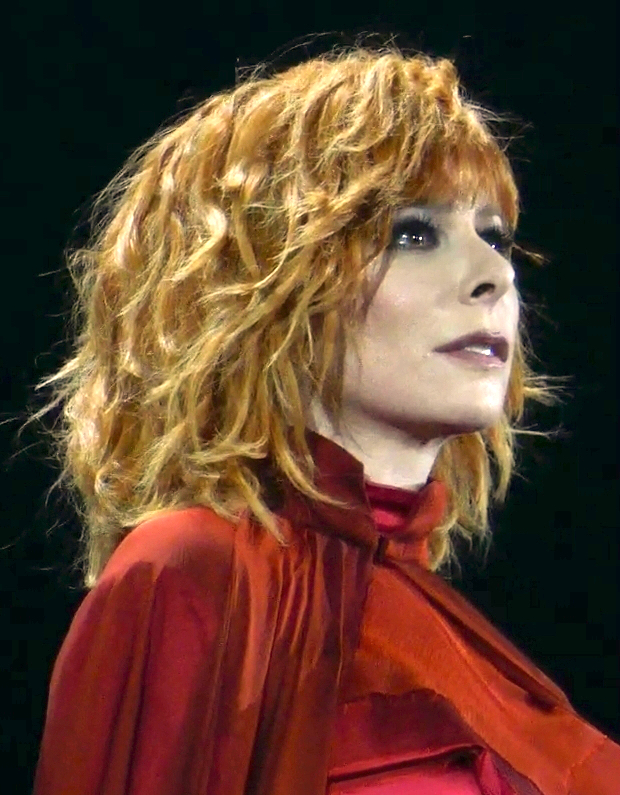
Mylène Farmer

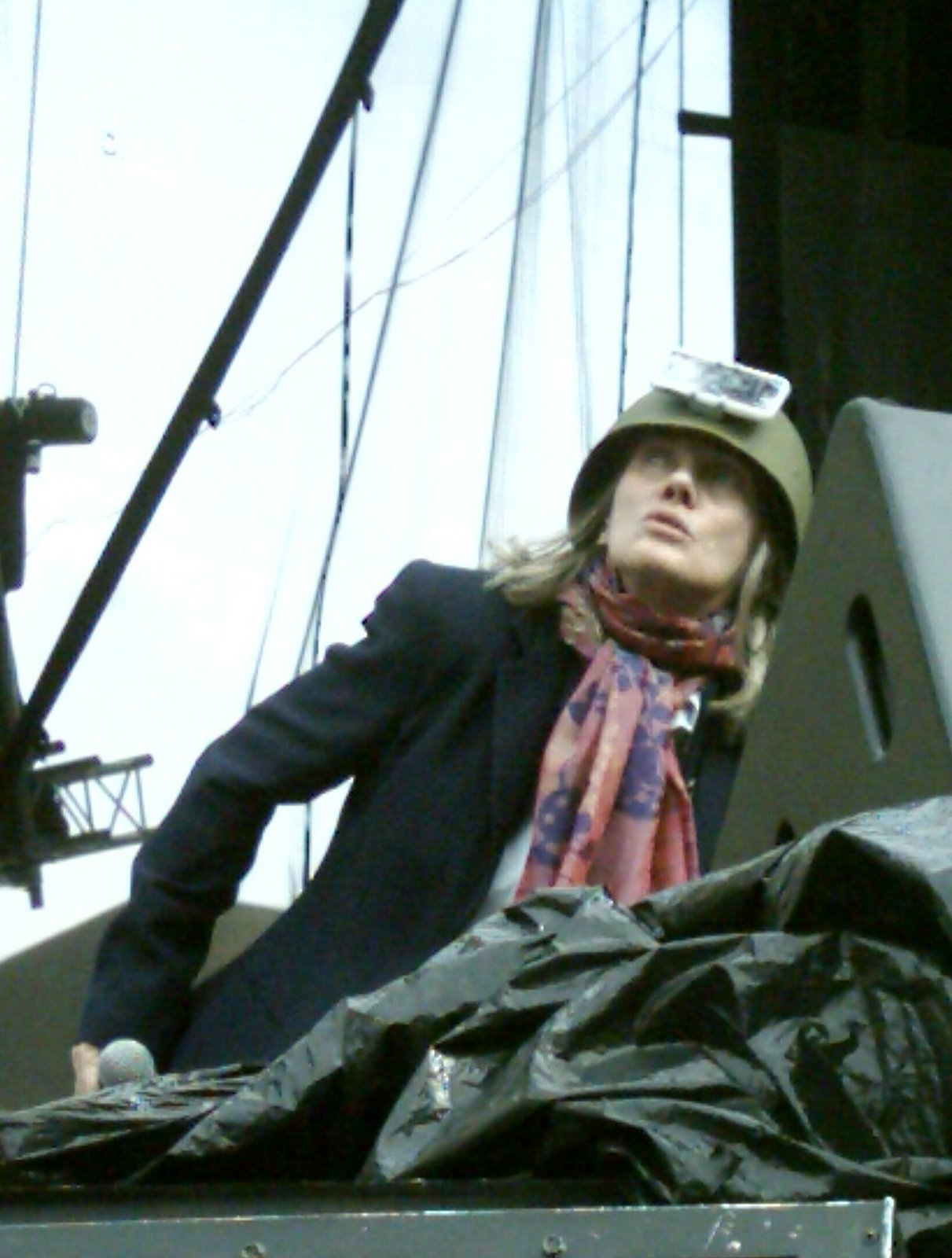
Diane Dufresne

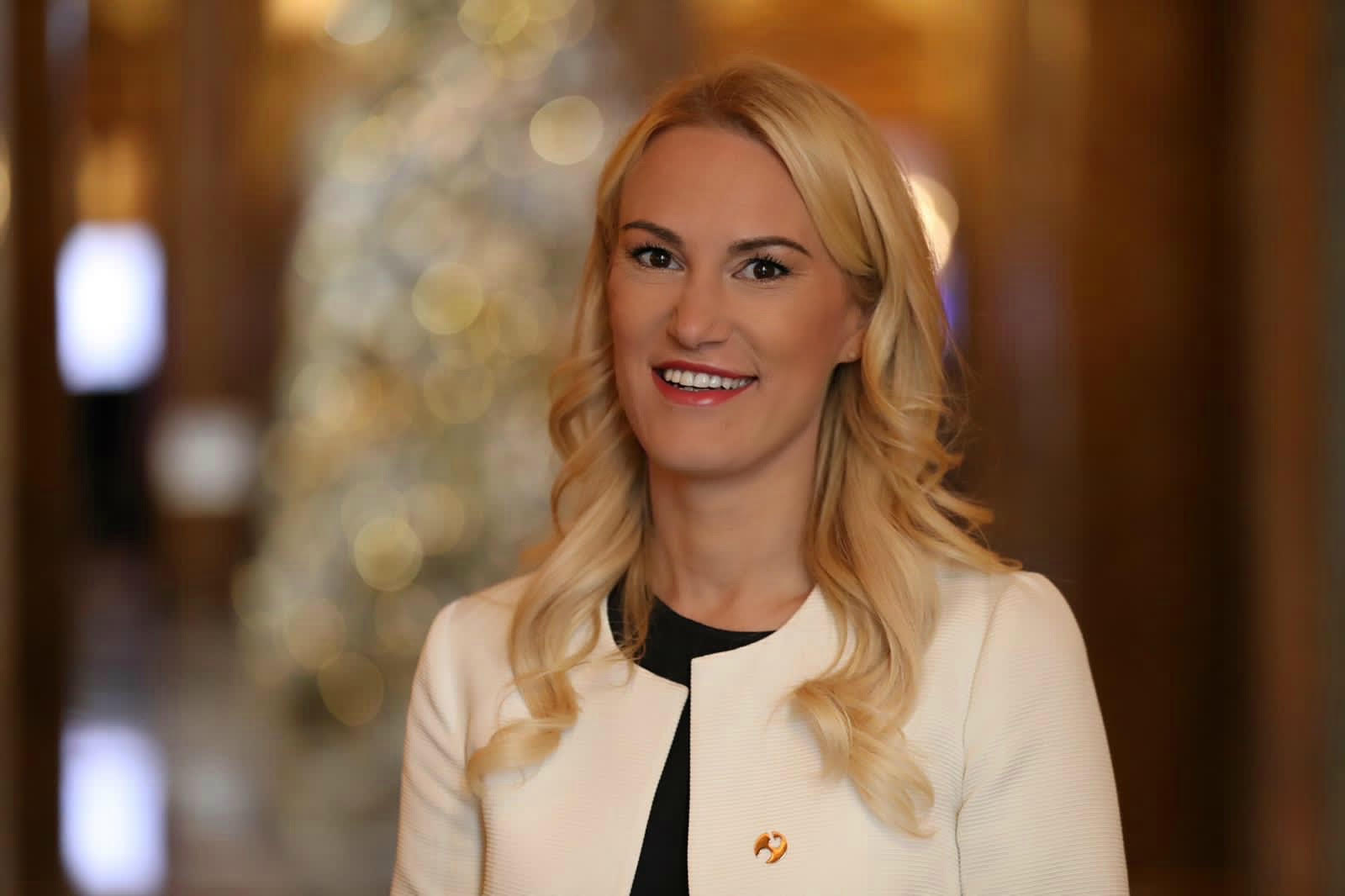
Marlène Harnois

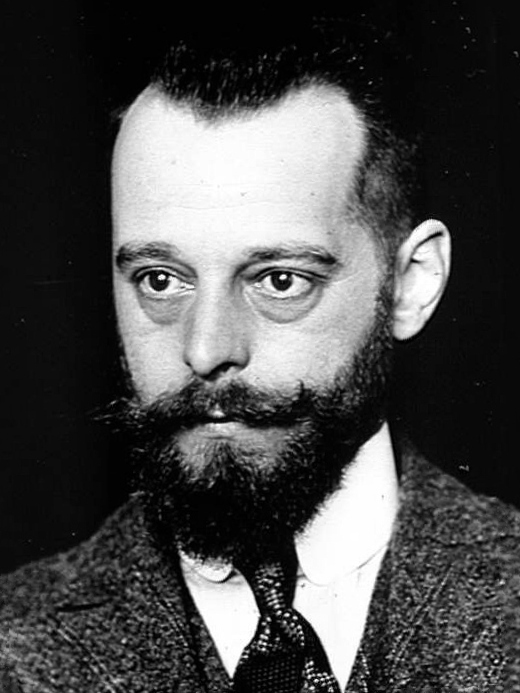
Félix d'Hérelle

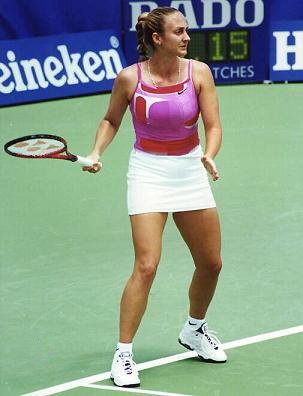
Mary Pierce

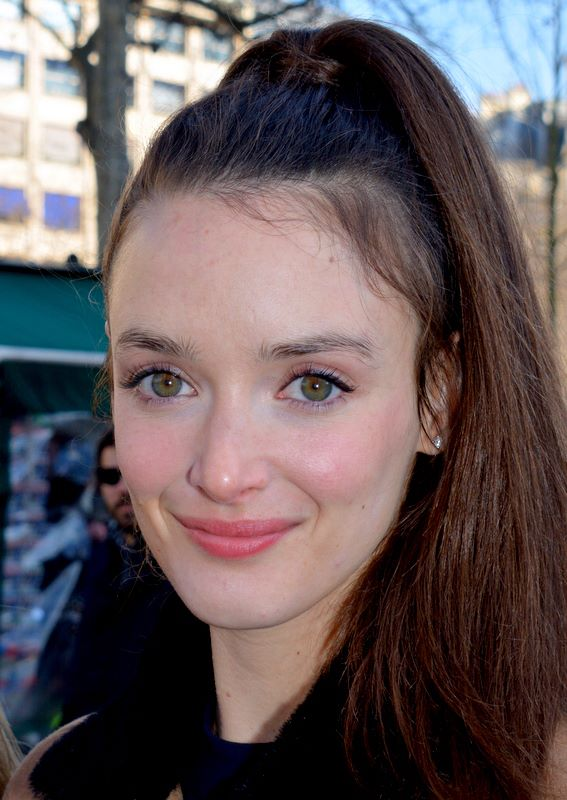
Charlotte Le Bon

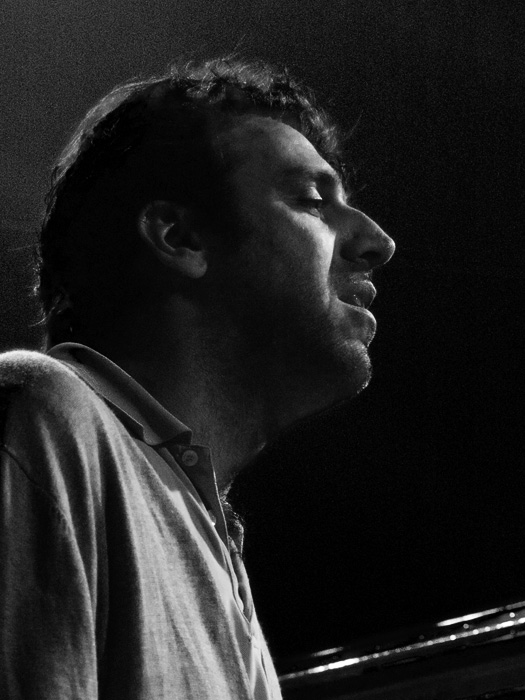
Chilly Gonzales

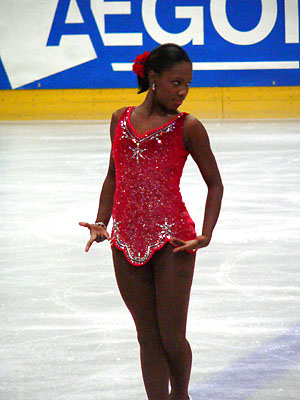
Vanessa James

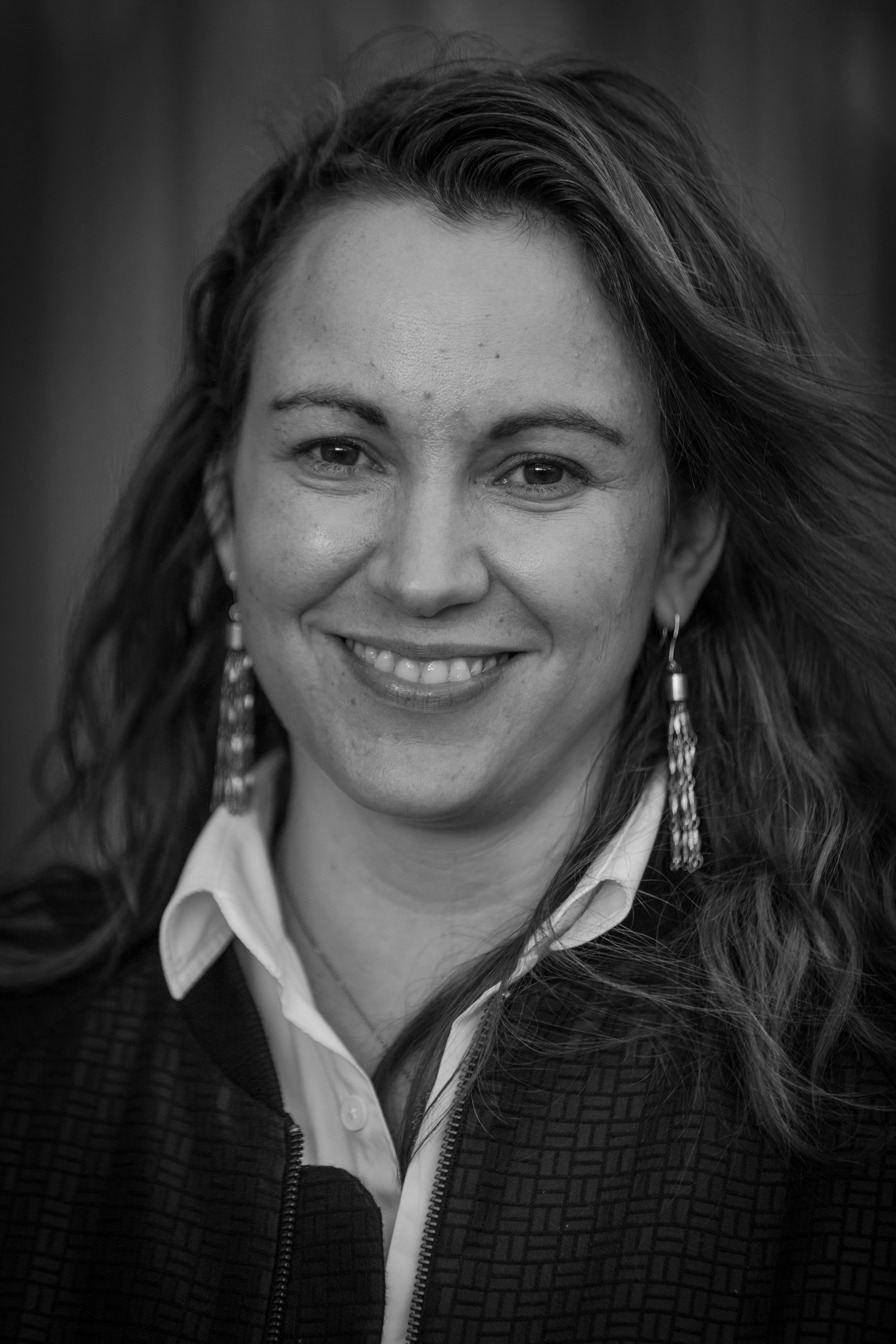
Axelle Lemaire

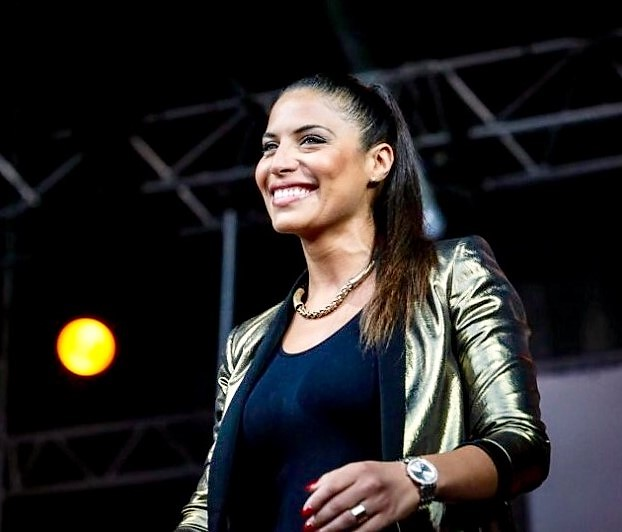
Zaho

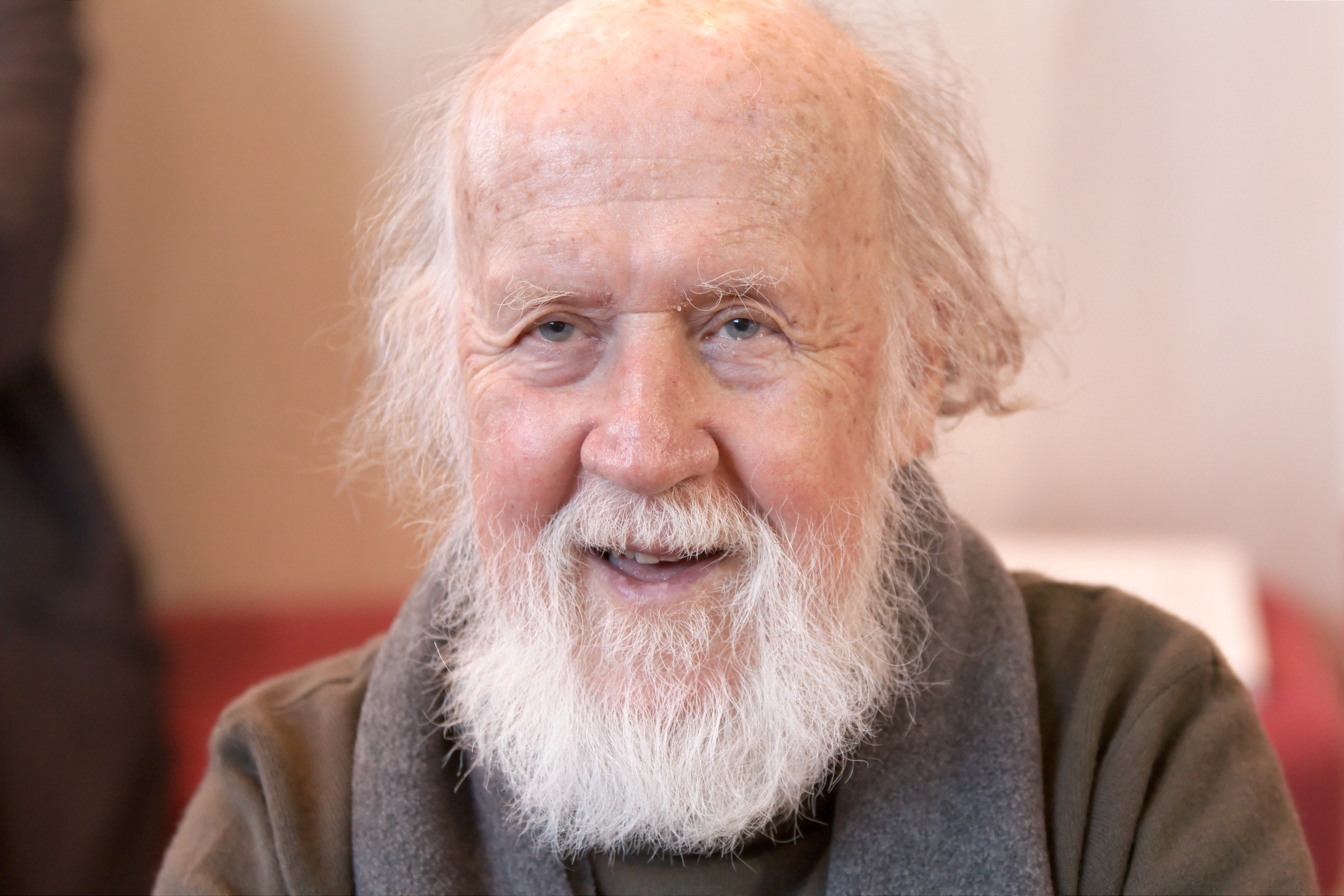
Hubert Reeves

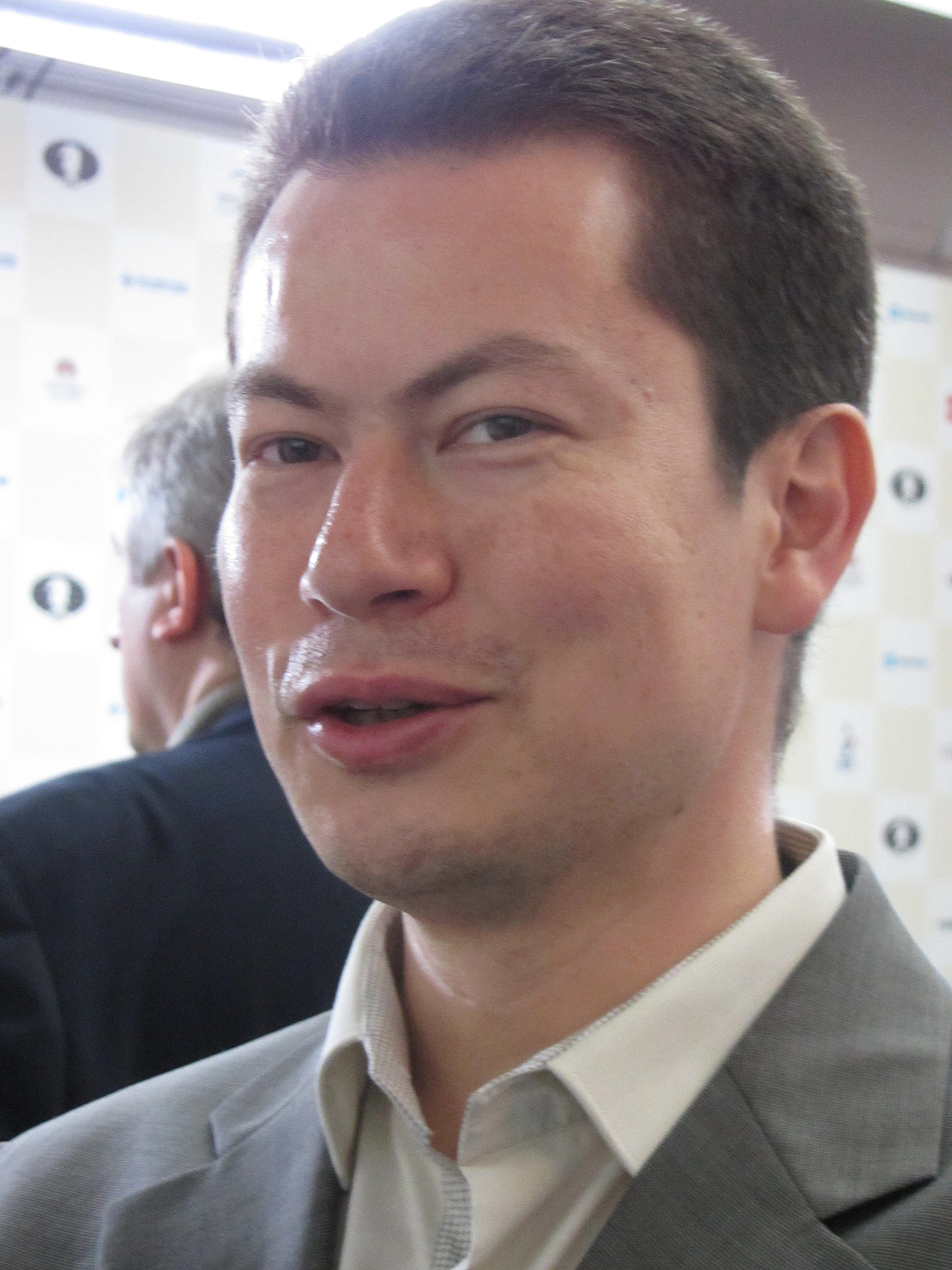
Joël Lautier

== See also ==
- Americans in France
- France–Canada relations
- French Canadians
