= American Cathedral in Paris during World War II =

The American Cathedral in Paris

The American Cathedral in Paris during World War II continued to function although France was occupied by Nazi Germany. Most Americans fled France in 1940 due to the Nazi conquest, including the Dean of the Cathedral, Frederick Beekman. Organist Lawrence Whipp, from Denver, Colorado, was left in charge. The Cathedral primarily served German soldiers with German-language sermons from 1942 to 1944. German pastor Rudolf Damrath presided and Whipp cooperated with him. After the liberation of Paris by Allied armies in August 1944, Beekman returned. Under mysterious circumstances, Whipp went missing in February 1945. His body was later found but the cause of death was never determined.

== Background ==
Thirty thousand Americans were living in Paris in the early 1930s. In addition to the Cathedral, several organizations in Paris were founded by and catered to Americans: The American Hospital of Paris, the American Library in Paris, the American Church in Paris, the American Chamber of Commerce, the American Club, the Rotary Club, the American Embassy, and, one of the most venerable, the American Cathedral.

The American Cathedral in Paris is offically known as the American Cathedral of the Holy Trinity. Its founding dates to 1857. Construction of the Cathedral was completed in 1886. A Protestant organization in a predominately Roman Catholic country, the French government prohibited the Cathedral from preaching in French. It was open to "all Americans and friends irrespective of church ties at home." The American Cathedral is located in the affluent Neuilly-sur-Seine district of Paris.

== Before the German occupation ==
On September 26, 1938, U.S. Ambassador to France William C. Bullitt advised all Americans to return to the United States due to the likelihood of war. Shortly afterwards, the Munich Agreement was reached and the U.S. cancelled its warning. Nevertheless, the Embassy continued to make preparations for war, buying gas masks for Embassy personnel, preparing for an evacuation by reserving hotel rooms in Royan and Bordeaux, and organizing a committee of civilians in case an evacuation became necessary.

On August 24, 1939, the Embassy again warned Americans to leave France. World War II began on September 1, 1939. The U.S. chartered five ships to transport Americans from France to the United States. More than 20,000 Americans from all over France chose to leave. The remaining membership of the American Cathedal supported France. The Junior Guild and the Women's Auxiliary made 175,000 surgical dressings and winter clothing for French soldiers. In May 1940, the Embassy estimated that 2,500 Americans remained in Paris. In western Europe, the Phony War became a real war in that month and in June Nazi Germany invaded France. In accordance with the Armistice of June 22, 1940 between France and Germany, the Germans occupied Paris and much of France. The United States remained a neutral in the war until December 11, 1941.

== Occupation ==
At the beginning of the war, the American Cathedral had two American clergymen in residence: Frederick W. Beekman and Lawrence K. Whipp. Beekman had been Dean of the Cathedral since 1918. Whipp, from Denver, Colorado, was the organist, choir master, and lay reader. He had worked in the Cathedral since 1921. With the German army advancing on Paris in June 1940, two million Parisians, including Beekman, fled the city to seek safety in southern France. Most soon returned, but Beekman made his way to the United States where he remained until near the end of the war. Whipp stayed in Paris to serve a shrunken congregation.

The American Embassy tried to protect the Americans and American organizations still in Paris. The Embassy issued more than 1,000 "Protection of Property Certificates" to Americans and American organizations. Displaying the certificates seemed to protect at least some American properties, but after the U.S. entered the war in December 1941, the Germans began the process of confiscating all American-owned property in France.

Whipp was one of 430 American men arrested in Paris shortly after the U.S. entered the war. The Americans were imprisoned in the Royallieu-Compiègne internment camp. At the camp, Whipp became a Kapo, an intermediary between the Germans and the prisoners. He organized musical entertainment for the prisoners and their German captors. He was also on a panel which judged and decreed punishments for prisoners who had broken German rules. Whipp was unpopular with many of the prisoners, apparently because of his cooperation with the Germans and possibly because he was a homosexual. He told another prisoner, Sumner Jackson, that he was treated better by the Germans than by his compatriots.

In August 1942, the Cathedral was seized by the Germans and a German Lutheran pastor, Rudolf Damrath, was installed as its head. The Germans inventoried and protected all the valuables owned by the Cathedral. Whipp was released from prison in October 1942, possibly at the request of Damrath and French friends. Returning to the Cathedral, he met with Damrath. Damrath told Whipp that he had lobbied for his release, thus gaining Whipp's gratitude. Damrath claimed he was anti-Nazi and in danger from the Gestapo. The two became friends. Until the allied reconquest of Paris in August 1944, Damrath and Whipp presided over a congregation composed mostly of German soldiers plus a few French, American, and other Protestants. Damrath had been an enthusiastic Nazi in the early days of the movement, but became disillusioned. He was a military pastor and was assigned as the leader of all military chaplains in France in World War II. He walked "a fine line" in his sermons, preaching on sensitive subjects to an audience which included members of the Gestapo. Damrath remained in Paris to care for wounded German soldiers after the German army evacuated the city. He was taken prisoner by the conquering allies. He was released and repatriated to Germany in 1946.

== Liberation and a death ==
With Damrath gone, Whipp was again in charge of the Cathedral. On August 25, 1944, he preached the first sermon in English in the Cathedral since 1941. In October Whipp wrote Beekman in the U.S. asking him to return to Paris and mentioning that the religious services were packed with "loudly singing American soldiers." American Episcopal military chaplains presided over the Cathedral until the return of Beekman in December 1944.

Author Cameron Allen suggests that all was not well between Whipp and Beekman. Beekman, he said, was jealous at the favorable publicity Whipp was receiving as one of the few Americans who remained in Paris during the German occupation. Whipp on his part greeted Beekman on his return by saying, "Take back your damned baby", referring to the Cathedral. Whipp planned to return to the United States for a visit, but on February 11, 1945, he played the organ at Sunday services and afterwards went to lunch with a female friend. After lunch he disappeared. His body was found in the Seine River near Argenteuil on April 17, 1945. The cause of his death has never been determined. It might have been an accident or suicide or murder. Paris was still in an unsettled post-occupation period. Whipp might have been killed by one of the enemies he had made while a prisoner of the Germans or during the years in which he led the Cathedral. A female friend said, "He knew too many things. He was too dangerous a witness."

Dean Frederick Beekman retired in 1949 and died in 1964 in Geneva, Switzerland. Damrath died in 1959.
