= Canadian Expat Association =

Rgistered Canadian lobby

- Abbreviation: CEA
- Formation: 2007
- Type: Lobby group
- Legal status: Non-profit organization
- Purpose: Advocacy for Canadians living abroad
- Headquarters: Ottawa, Ontario, Canada
- Services: Travel service, global directory, job bank, regional contacts
- President: Allan Nichols
- Executive Director: Ivan Ross Vrána
- Website: thecanadianexpat.com

Canadian Expat Association is a registered Canadian lobby that focuses on creating awareness amongst Canadians and legislators of the value of the Canadian expat community and issues faced by Canadians living abroad. The association was founded in 2007 and publishes newsletters for its members.

Headquartered in Ottawa, Ontario, the organization is managed by the following individuals: Mr. Allan Nichols (President), and Mr. Ivan Ross Vrána (executive director) in Ottawa.

The CEA offers a variety of services for their members including Travel Service, a network of Regional Contacts around the world, a Global Directory of businesses serving the local Canadian expat population, and a job bank for members to search.

In September 2011, it was announced that Tim Hortons had become a Corporate Founding Member of the association.
