= German Brazilians =

Brazilian person of ethnic German ancestry or origin

German Brazilians Teuto-brasileiros Deutschbrasilianer
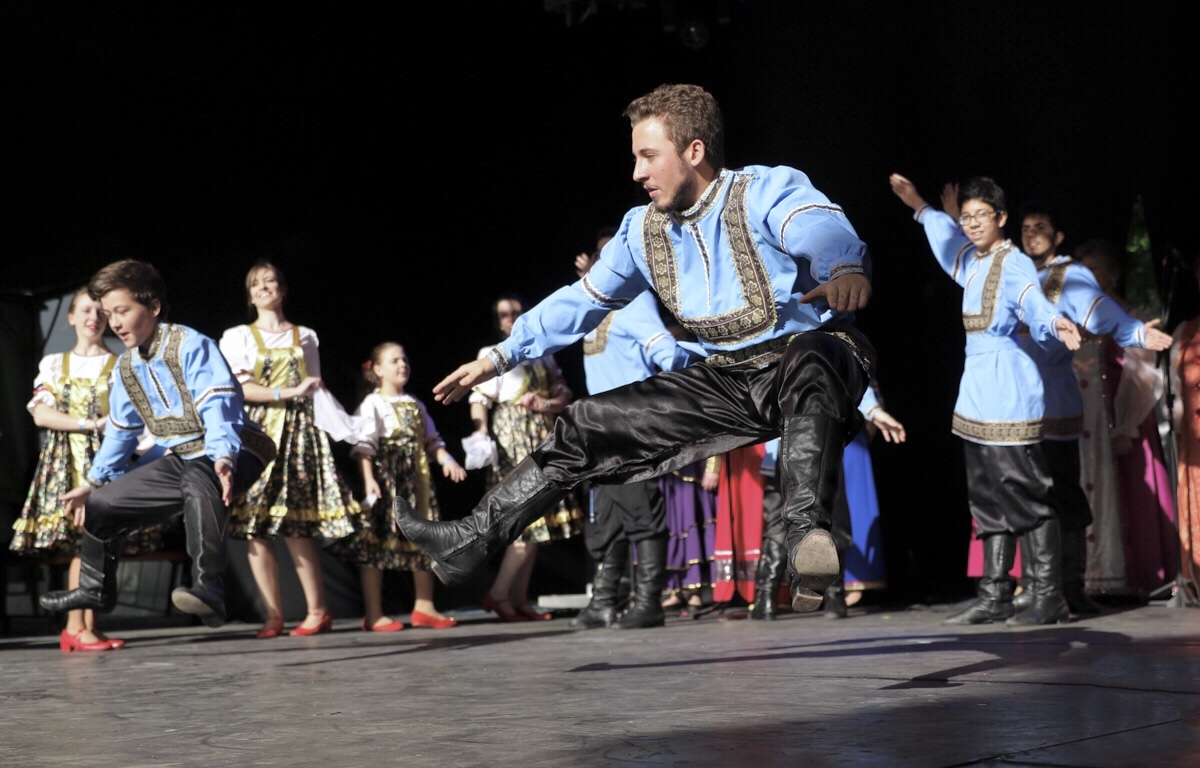
- German descendants in São Paulo

Total population
- 5,000,000–12,000,000

Regions with significant populations
- Southern region; Southeastern region

Languages
- Predominantly Portuguese. Significant numbers speak Brazilian German dialects as their mother tongue; the largest group with est. 3,000,000 native Riograndenser Hunsrückisch speakers.

Religion
- Roman Catholicism; Protestantism (Note: Mainly Lutheranism, with Reformed and Anabaptist minorities.) Judaism (Ashkenazi Jews); Irreligious

Related ethnic groups
- Germans, other Brazilians

German Brazilians (German: Deutschbrasilianer, Hunsrik: Deitschbrasiliooner, Portuguese: teuto-brasileiros) refers to Brazilians of full or partial German ancestry. German Brazilians live mostly in the country's South Region, with a smaller but still significant percentage living in the Southeast Region.

Between 1824 and 1972, about 260,000 Germans settled in Brazil, the fifth largest nationality to immigrate after the Portuguese, Italians, Spaniards and Japanese.

The first German immigrants to Brazil arrived as early as the 16th century, although organized immigration began only in the 19th century. The causes of this process can be found in the frequent social problems that occurred in Europe and the abundance of land in Brazil. In 1986, Born and Dickgiesser estimated the number of German descendants in Brazil at 3.6 million. According to another survey, from 1999, by sociologist and former president of the Brazilian Institute of Geography and Statistics (IBGE), Simon Schwartzman, 3.6% of the Brazilians interviewed claimed to have German ancestry, a percentage that, in a population of about 200 million Brazilians, would represent 7.2 million descendants. In 2004, Deutsche Welle cited the number of 5 million Brazilians of German descent. According to a 2016 survey published by IPEA, in a universe of 46,801,772 names of Brazilians analyzed, 1,525,890 or 3.3% of them had the only or the last surname of Germanic origin.

German immigration to Brazil began before the independence from Portugal and remained relatively constant until the 1960s. The reasons for this emigration lie, on one hand, in the socio-political-economic transformations that Germany underwent and, on the other, in the exceptional conditions that favored the attraction of European immigrants in Brazil. Between 1824 and 1972, about 260,000 Germans entered Brazil; the fifth nationality that immigrated the most to the country, after the Portuguese, Italians, Spaniards and Japanese.

The Germans were among the nationalities that managed to preserve their culture in Brazil the most. Due to their isolation in hard-to-access regions, especially in the southern states, it was possible to create several predominantly Germanic colonies. One of the most significant examples of cultural maintenance was the proliferation of German schools in Brazil, as well as a German-language press. As a consequence, thousands of descendants were educated in German, without knowledge of the Portuguese language. Over time, the traits of Germanness became weaker, but the influences persist more or less until today. For example, one can cite the large number of Brazilians of German origin who still speak German or other Germanic dialects such as Hunsrückisch and Pomeranian.

The result of German immigration in Brazil was the formation of a German Brazilian population, which integrated into the Brazilian context, but without abdicating its culture. In addition to the cultural influence, one can add the German contribution to the diversification of Brazilian agriculture, through the formation of a typical peasantry, strongly marked by the traits of peasant culture from Central Europe. The Germans also participated in the process of urbanization and industrialization of Brazil, as well as in the introduction and modifications in the architecture of cities and in the Brazilian physical-social landscape.

== Introduction and numbers ==
The 19th century was marked by intense emigration of Europeans; between 1846 and 1932, about 60 million people left the continent. The overwhelming majority of this flow had as its destination the United States, where Germans consolidated themselves as the largest ethnic immigrant group, representing 21.9% of the total at the end of the century. In contrast, German immigration to Brazil, although of great regional impact, especially in the South, was numerically modest, representing about 2% of total German emigrants:

Overseas German emigration by destination (1847–1914)
Period	Total emigrants	United States	Canada	Brazil	Argentina	Australia
1847–1850	145 300	129 400 (89.1%)	9 600 (6.6%)	1 100 (0.8%)	–	4 800 (3.3%)
1851–1855	403 100	322 400 (80.0%)	16 400 (4.1%)	8 100 (2.0%)	–	11 700 (2.9%)
1856–1860	268 500	227 300 (84.7%)	10 200 (3.8%)	9 900 (3.7%)	–	7 000 (2.6%)
1861–1865	249 400	208 400 (83.6%)	10 800 (4.3%)	3 900 (1.6%)	–	7 000 (2.9%)
1866–1870	530 200	474 200 (89.4%)	14 800 (2.8%)	9 600 (1.8%)	–	2 200 (0.4%)
1871–1875	394 700	365 100 (92.5%)	900 (0.2%)	11 600 (2.9%)	700 (0.2%)	5 200 (1.3%)
1876–1880	228 100	195 300 (85.6%)	400 (0.2%)	9 300 (4.1%)	800 (0.4%)	4 700 (2.1%)
1881–1885	857 300	797 000 (93.0%)	2 700 (0.3%)	7 900 (0.9%)	3 000 (0.3%)	5 400 (0.6%)
1886–1890	485 200	440 100 (90.7%)	1 200 (0.2%)	10 900 (2.2%)	5 300 (1.1%)	2 500 (0.5%)
1891–1895	402 600	371 500 (92.3%)	11 300 (2.8%)	8 400 (2.1%)	3 600 (0.9%)	1 500 (0.4%)
1896–1900	127 200	107 400 (84.4%)	1 700 (1.3%)	4 000 (3.1%)	2 800 (2.2%)	1 000 (0.8%)
1901–1905	146 600	134 900 (92.0%)	1 200 (0.8%)	2 600 (1.8%)	1 800 (1.2%)	800 (0.5%)
1906–1910	133 100	120 300 (90.4%)	2 000 (1.5%)	1 400 (1.1%)	2 800 (2.1%)	700 (0.5%)
1911–1914	78 800	61 300 (77.8%)	3 300 (4.2%)	800 (1.0%)	3 600 (4.6%)	1 200 (1.5%)
Total (1847–1914)	4,450,100	3 774 600 (84.8%)	86 500 (1.9%)	89 500 (2.0%)	24 400 (0.5%)	55 700 (1.3%)

The choice of migratory destination among 19th-century Germans was influenced by recruitment campaigns that offered different life prospects. While the United States was promoted as the "Land of Political Freedom" and of quick enrichment, Brazil was presented as the "Paradise of Property", focusing on peasants who sought autonomy and patrimonial stability that Europe no longer allowed.

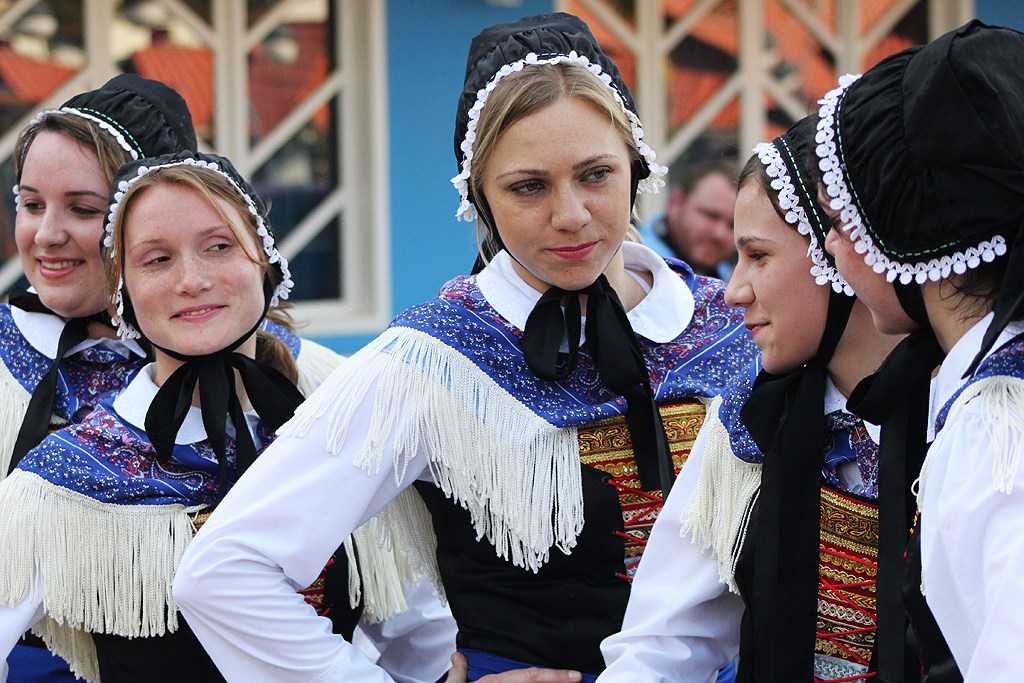
Young descendants of Pomeranians, in typical costumes, in Santa Maria de Jetibá, in the state of Espírito Santo.

Different from the migratory flow to North America, which aimed at rapid economic and political integration, many intellectuals and community leaders in Germany defended Brazil as a destination that would allow the preservation of the "German essence". The geographic isolation of the colonies in southern Brazil was seen not as an obstacle, but as an asset to avoid acculturation.

The disparity in immigration volume between the two countries was consolidated through their land legislation, which defined who could become a landowner. In Brazil, during the initial phase of immigration (1824–1848), the imperial government used the system of lot donations to attract German settlers, offering free land and subsidies for tools and seeds. However, this model was abolished with the Land Law of 1850, which instituted cash purchase as the only form of access to land. With high prices and complex bureaucracy, the law aimed to force immigrants to work on large coffee farms before acquiring their own land, limiting land ownership to a minority or to specific colonial nuclei. Although this law ended free donations, German immigrants continued to form small property nuclei through mechanisms of purchase and directed colonization. Access to land began to occur mostly through private colonization companies or provincial programs that sold lots on credit. In turn, in the United States, the Homestead Act of 1862 went in the opposite direction: the American government granted 160 acres (64 hectares) free of charge to any immigrant who cultivated the land for five years. This policy democratized property and attracted millions of people, creating a vast rural middle class.

The economic trajectory of German immigrants diverged significantly between destinations in the United States and Brazil due to different market structures and access to capital. In the United States, the migratory flow was marked by rapid enrichment and social mobility; the dynamic economy, supported by an accessible banking credit network and demand from expanding industrial cities, allowed production surpluses to be quickly converted into capital. In this context, immigrant success was measured by financial accumulation and the mechanization of farming. In contrast, in Brazil, success was guided by autonomy and the formation of landed patrimony. Although in Brazil the lack of infrastructure and nearby consumer markets hindered the accumulation of large monetary fortunes in the first generations, settlers achieved material stability superior to that which they had possessed in Europe, characterized by a solid house of their own, food security, and the guarantee of inheritance for descendants.

The table below presents the main institutional differences between Brazil and the United States and their effects on the volume and characteristics of German immigration throughout the 19th century.

Comparison between German immigration to Brazil and the United States and its long-term outcomes
Characteristic	Brazil	United States	Outcomes
Access to Land	Costly: Public lands had to be purchased with cash (Land Law).	Free: Grant of 160 acres to those who cultivated the land (Homestead Act).	In Brazil, the legal requirement of initial capital after the 1850 Land Law led German immigrants to access land primarily through installment purchases in official colonies, mediation by private colonization companies, or, to a lesser extent, direct purchases between individuals, implying initial indebtedness and gradual social mobility. In the United States, the availability of free land reduced economic barriers, favoring mass immigration, rapid territorial occupation, and the formation of a broad rural middle class of German origin.
Voyage and Route	Long and costly: Crossing of the South Atlantic, with longer duration, higher costs, and greater sanitary risk.	Short and accessible: Frequent North Atlantic routes, with cheaper fares.	The cost and duration of the journey to Brazil reduced migratory volume and favored selective or subsidized flows. In the United States, the shorter distance facilitated chain migration and the maintenance of continuous flows throughout the nineteenth century.
Social Integration	Relative isolationism: Formation of colonial settlements preserving language, religion, and their own institutions (Deutschtum).	Assimilation: Relatively rapid integration into the political, economic, and urban system (Melting Pot).	In Brazil, geographic isolation favored the preservation of Germanic culture but delayed national political and economic integration. In the United States, assimilation expanded access to citizenship, the urban-industrial labor market, and political representation.
Climate and Adaptation	Initially adverse environment: Dense forest, endemic diseases, and precarious infrastructure, despite the subtropical climate in the South.	Similar: Temperate climate close to that of Central Europe.	In Brazil, initial environmental conditions increased mortality and hindered agricultural adaptation in the early years. In the United States, climatic familiarity and the occupation of areas already integrated into the market economy favored rapid productive adaptation and the replication of European agricultural techniques.
Territorial Development	"Islands" of colonization: Regional settlements weakly integrated into the national market.	Continental expansion: Territorial integration through railroads, markets, and industrial cities.	In Brazil, territorial fragmentation limited the national macroeconomic impact of the colonies. In the United States, integration into infrastructure expanded economic diversification and the national projection of people of German descent.
Labor Regime and Slavery	Existence of slave labor until 1888: The presence of enslaved labor reduced demand for free labor, reinforced land concentration, and directed German immigrants toward controlled agricultural colonies and debt-based labor regimes on coffee plantations.	Predominance of free labor: In the regions that attracted the most Germans, the economy was based on wage labor and small property.	Brazil's slaveholding legacy reduced the country's relative attractiveness to German immigrants. In the United States, the predominance of free labor favored greater migratory volume and immediate economic integration.
Labor Conflicts and German Migration Policy	Crisis of the partnership system and official restrictions: The Ibicaba Revolt (1856–1857) exposed abuses in agricultural partnership contracts and had wide international repercussions. In 1859, the Prussian government issued the Heydt Rescript, restricting subsidized emigration to Brazil.	Absence of equivalent state restrictions: The United States did not face comparable migratory sanctions from German governments, remaining a preferred and institutionally secure destination.	In Brazil, the association between labor conflicts, negative international reputation, and restrictions imposed by German governments reduced and made more selective German immigration after the 1860s. In the United States, the continuity of institutional guarantees reinforced mass immigration and chain migration.
Industrialization and Urban Labor Market	Late and limited industrialization: The Brazilian industrial sector remained incipient until the late nineteenth century, offering relatively few urban-industrial employment opportunities for immigrants.	Early and expansive industrialization: Rapid industrialization created broad demand for workers in cities and industrial regions.	In Brazil, the limited industrial labor market reduced attractiveness for non-rural Germans. In the United States, industrial expansion allowed immediate insertion as wage workers, favoring mass immigration and urban social mobility.
Freedom of Worship	Limited until 1891: Catholicism was the official religion of the Empire; Protestant worship was restricted to the private sphere.	Guaranteed from the outset: Religious freedom constitutionally ensured since the eighteenth century.	The limitation of religious freedom in Brazil reduced the interest of German Protestants and hindered community institutional organization. In the United States, full freedom of worship strengthened social and religious networks that stimulated chain migration.

According to the IBGE, between 1824 and 1969, 250,166 German immigrants entered Brazil. It should be noted, however, that before 1871, Germany did not exist as a nation-state. Until the German unification, the term "German" referred to the subjects of the Holy Roman Empire (dating from the 10th century), of the German Nation (which existed from the 15th–16th centuries until 1806), and then of the German Confederation. Furthermore, depending on the criterion adopted, among the "Germans" one should include people from regions of German culture outside the current German territory, such as Austria and Switzerland, as well as German minorities within Russia and Poland, etc., who were not counted as Germans when they arrived in Brazil. For example, the Volga Germans, who settled in the 1870s in Paraná, were counted as "Russians" in Brazilian statistics, although they were of German language and culture.

German immigration to Brazil, by decades, from 1824 to 1969; Source: Brazilian Institute of Geography and Statistics (IBGE)
Decades	1824–1847	1848–1872	1872–1879	1880–1889	1890–1899	1900–1909	1910–1919	1920–1929	1930–1939	1940–1949	1950–1959	1960–1969	Total
Immigrants	8,176	19,523	14,325	18,901	17,084	13,848	25,902	75,801	27,497	6,807	16,643	5,659	250,166

=== Demographic Explosion ===
Demographic evolution of the São Leopoldo colony (1824–1870)
Period	Approximate population	Growth in the period (%)	Observations
1824	126	—	Beginning of immigration
1825–1830	4,850	3,749	Period of intense immigration
1831–1846	11,200	131	Impact of the War of the Farrapos
1847–1858	22,000	96	Saturation of the first lots
1859–1870	35,000	59	Expansion to "daughter" colonies
Total (1824–1870)	35,000	—	Final population

Despite the relatively modest number of German immigrants (between 1820 and 1963, 1,767,334 Portuguese immigrants and 1,624,722 Italians entered Brazil), the Germans displayed a singular pattern of population growth, described by Jean Roche as an "explosive settlement." The abundance of land in southern Brazil during the nineteenth century allowed for early marriages among German women (18–19 years old) and large families, with averages of 8.5 children per woman in the first generation and 10.4 in the second – leading authors such as David T. Haberly to characterize German Brazilian high fertility as a "demographic anomaly" within the Western world context. Giralda Seyferth also attests to the high fertility of Germans in Brazil, citing as an example the colony of Blumenau, where rural families maintained an average of 8 to 10 children, a pattern that persisted consistently until the early decades of the twentieth century. This reproductive vigor surpassed the indices recorded in Germany, where land scarcity delayed women’s marriages to ages between 24 and 27 and limited offspring to an average of 4 or 5 children. German Brazilian fertility was also higher than that recorded among Germans in the American Midwest, where the average marriage age was slightly higher (between 21 and 23 years), with an average of 6 to 7 children.

The demographic success was sustained by the “protective isolation” of Brazilian forests from urban epidemics and by a protein-rich diet superior to that of Europe, which drastically reduced infant mortality. Within this system, children were essential economic assets for the establishment of “daughter colonies” and the expansion of family patrimony. In geometric progression, the community doubled in size every 20 years; if in 1872 German Brazilians represented 7% of the population of Rio Grande do Sul, by 1920 they already accounted for 20%. By 1940, it is estimated that more than 90% of the community was already composed of Brazilian-born descendants.

The demographic vigor of German colonies in Brazil did not go unnoticed by international observers and Brazilian intellectuals, fueling debate over the so-called “German Peril.” In 1904, the American jurist T. B. Edgington described the population increase in Blumenau as “marvelous,” noting that the population doubled every ten years. This rapid growth, combined with cultural and linguistic isolation, generated fears that southern Brazil could be absorbed into the German sphere of influence, transforming into a “Greater Germany” in South American territory. Such a scenario provoked geopolitical concerns both within the Brazilian government and in the United States Department of State, which, based on the Monroe Doctrine, feared the loss of influence in the region to the expansionist interests of the German Empire.

There are no precise statistical data regarding the number of descendants of German immigrants in Brazil. Estimates vary widely in the bibliography and in public debate due to the absence of censuses that systematically record ethnic ancestry. The Brazilian Institute of Geography and Statistics (IBGE) has never collected data on the ethnic origin of Brazilians, limiting itself to criteria such as nationality, place of birth, language spoken at home, or racial self-identification — categories that do not allow precise identification of German descent. Thus, frequently cited figures — often in the millions — are based on indirect estimates, regional demographic projections, or calculations derived from historical immigration, and should be interpreted with caution as approximations rather than consolidated demographic data.

== Causes of immigration in the 19th century ==
=== Reasons for leaving Germany ===
Until the unification in 1871, there was no German national state; the region was a mosaic composed of various principalities, counties, kingdoms, and duchies. European powers regarded German fragmentation as a pillar of continental geopolitics, fearing that a unified Germany would disrupt the balance of power. In this context, the region became one of the main sources of emigration in the 19th century: between 1824 and 1914, approximately 5.4 million Germans left Europe. Brazil attracted only a small fraction of this contingent (about 2% of the total), while the United States absorbed more than 90% of the flow. Despite this disparity, Brazil consolidated its position as the second most preferred destination outside North America, surpassing Argentina (0.85%) and Canada (0.84%) between 1871 and 1913.

The reasons behind this large-scale departure can be summarized through a combination of push and pull factors. Historically, there was already a strong migratory tradition directed toward North America since the 18th century, with estimates of up to 100,000 immigrants during the colonial period. Between 1816 and 1914, this flow to the United States rose to 5.5 million people, prompting Brazil to attempt to “divert” part of this consolidated movement through active propaganda and subsidies.

In the economic sphere, subsistence crises and severe inflation were decisive factors. In 1842, crop failures raised the price of grains by up to 300% and that of potatoes by 425% within just two years, provoking rebellions fueled by famine and transforming emigration into a survival strategy. This situation was compounded by a problematic landholding structure: in southwestern Germany — in areas such as Hunsrück, the Palatinate, Baden, and Württemberg — inheritance legislation required the division of property among all heirs. The result was excessive fragmentation, with 75% of farmers lacking sufficient land for subsistence and more than 60% of properties measuring less than 5 hectares, in some cases shrinking to parcels of 1 to 2 hectares in Hunsrück. Additionally, high taxation further aggravated rural precariousness, reaching between 30% and 40% of the income of poor peasants.

Demographic pressure also played a central role, as the German population increased from 24.9 million in 1820 to 33.7 million in 1850. At the same time, the advance of mechanization and industrialization disrupted traditional labor markets, making emigration a "safety valve" for surplus labor. Politically, instability generated by the Napoleonic Wars and the Revolutions of 1848 created a climate of uncertainty and repression. Following unification under Prussian hegemony, rigorous militarism and compulsory military service became significant burdens, particularly after the Franco-Prussian War. For many peasant and artisan families, emigration represented an alternative to the loss of young labor through mandatory recruitment for expansionist conflicts.

German immigration to Brazil also increased during specific conjunctural moments, such as in 1924, when the Immigration Act of 1924 imposed rigid quotas and monthly limits on immigrant entry into the United States. As a result, the proportion of Germans migrating to North America fell to 38.5%, redirecting thousands of immigrants to Brazil and Argentina. Finally, the flow was reinforced by immigration networks, in which letters from already established relatives facilitated logistics and encouraged new departures through the phenomenon known as the “chain migration.”

=== Reasons for Brazil receiving Germans ===
The motivation of the Brazilian state to attract German immigrants in the 19th century was multifaceted, involving military, geopolitical, and economic strategies. Popular historiography often attributes a central role to the Austrian Maria Leopoldina of Austria, wife of Emperor Pedro I of Brazil. However, the first attempts at German settlement predated her arrival in Brazil. Historical documents indicate that the empress initially expressed reservations regarding the project: when Georg Anton Schäffer was sent to Europe to recruit settlers, she reportedly asked her father, Emperor Francis I of Austria, not to become involved in the recruitment. Leopoldina later supported the initiative, acting as an interpreter and facilitating the landing of immigrant ships.

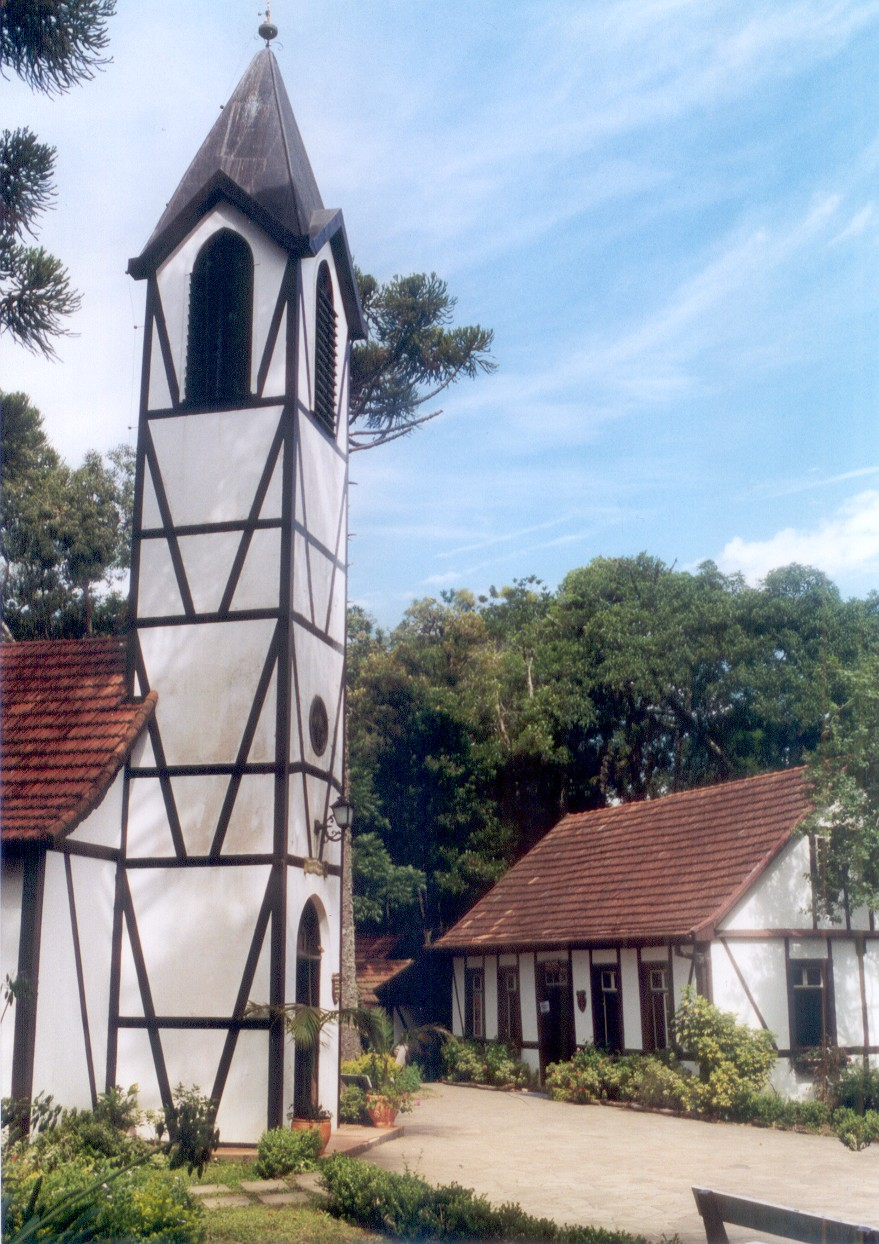
Buildings in half-timbering at the Immigrant Village Park in Nova Petrópolis, a construction style typical of German colonial architecture.

The architects of the first successful settlements were D. Pedro I and, fundamentally, José Bonifácio de Andrada e Silva. Bonifácio envisioned the creation of rural-military colonies inspired by the Cossacks of Russia, in which settlers would act as rural producers in times of peace and as a defensive force in times of war. A polyglot and connoisseur of German culture, Bonifácio identified in Central Europe – then exhausted by the Napoleonic Wars — a reservoir of qualified volunteers who could supply both labor and territorial defense in newly independent Brazil. Although initial plans considered Rio de Janeiro and southern Bahia, the Crown chose to direct German immigrants to southern Brazil for reasons of territorial sovereignty. The region was historically unstable and subject to disputes with Hispanic territories. In March 1824, D. Pedro I instructed the president of the province of Rio Grande do Sul to found the colony of São Leopoldo to consolidate possession of these lands.

In economic terms, the objective was to foster a rural middle class based on small property and free labor, in contrast to the predominant slave-based latifundium system in other regions of the country. Germans enjoyed a strong professional reputation, being regarded as skilled artisans and disciplined farmers. They also brought relatively high levels of literacy: while illiteracy in Brazil reached 82.3% in 1872, it is estimated that by 1850 approximately 85% of the population of Prussia was literate. This cultural capital facilitated the introduction of new productive techniques and the generation of surpluses for the domestic market.

Access to land constituted a major pull factor, as less than 20% of the population in Germany owned properties larger than 10 hectares at the time. However, the notion that the Brazilian government systematically granted land free of charge to German immigrants is considered a historiographical misconception. The regime of land donations (sesmarias and early colonies) lasted only until 1830. With the promulgation of the Land Law of 1850, access to property became conditional upon purchase, requiring payment in cash. During this period, the size of standard lots was also reduced from approximately 75 hectares to 25 hectares, making settlement increasingly challenging from an economic perspective.

Concurrently, there existed an ideological project of “whitening” the population, grounded in contemporary racial theories that associated progress with the Europeanization of customs and national demographics.

The migratory flow to Brazil was also strongly stimulated by immigration agents, pejoratively referred to in Europe as "soul brokers." These agents traveled through German villages employing promotional strategies that often distorted the realities of living and working conditions in Brazil to persuade peasant families to sign transportation and colonization contracts. This combination of official and private propaganda played a central role in the initial settlement process, but also contributed to significant adaptation crises when immigrants encountered the realities of dense forests, limited infrastructure, and geographic isolation.

== Phases ==
=== The first phase of immigration (1818–1830) ===
Decree of D. Pedro I supporting German immigration to Brazil, 1824.

The first German colony in Brazil was founded even before the independence. In 1818, in southern Bahia, the naturalist José Guilherme Freyreiss created the Leopoldina colony. The project failed, however, due to its structure based on sesmarias; without the support of family-based smallholdings, the settlers dispersed and immigrant labor was quickly replaced by slave labor. Subsequent attempts in Bahia in 1821 and 1822 repeated this failure. In contrast, in 1819, the government of Dom John VI settled Swiss families in the mountains of Rio de Janeiro province, founding Nova Friburgo. Initially unsuccessful due to isolation from consumer markets, the colony was revitalized in 1824 with the arrival of 350 Germans, consolidating itself as a transitional nucleus.

Despite these precedents, historiography has consecrated the foundation of São Leopoldo, in Rio Grande do Sul, as the initial landmark of organized German immigration. On July 25, 1824, the first 39 immigrants were settled on the southern bank of the Rio dos Sinos, at the former Real Feitoria do Linho Cânhamo. Recruitment was led by Georg Anton Schäffer, a major in the army and special envoy of the Empire to Europe. Schäffer faced diplomatic resistance in Austria, where Chancellor Klemens von Metternich viewed the loss of subjects to America with suspicion. As a result, he concentrated efforts in the German Confederation (Bavaria, Hesse, and the Hanseatic cities), taking advantage of local rulers’ desire to encourage the emigration of dispossessed peasants and inmates of correctional institutions as a form of social relief.

Entry of Germans into Rio Grande do Sul (1824–1914)
Period	Number
1824–1830	5,350
1831–1845	153
1846–1850	2,565
1851–1865	10,454
1866–1880	8,845
1881–1895	9,896
1896–1910	5,329
1911–1914	5,445
Total	48,037

To attract settlers, the Brazilian government offered a package of benefits: paid passage, plots of 78 hectares (equivalent to two colonial lots), a daily subsidy during the first year, tax exemption, and exemption from military service (except for those specifically recruited for the Foreign Battalion). Although Catholicism was the official religion of Brazil, Protestantism was tolerated, provided that churches had no external features such as towers or bells. Immigration agents operating in Germany described Brazil in deliberately optimistic terms, exaggerating land fertility, ease of access to property, and living conditions, while minimizing or omitting information about isolation, lack of infrastructure, initial hardships, and sanitary risks faced by settlers during the first years.

In 1827, the flow expanded to the province of São Paulo, where settlers were established in Santo Amaro and later in Rio Claro, as well as in pioneering partnership arrangements in coffee production. In 1829, the first nuclei were created in Santa Catarina (São Pedro de Alcântara) and in Paraná (Rio Negro). This phase ended in 1830 due to the exhaustion of public funds and the instability that preceded the Ragamuffin War.

The economic model in these areas was based on small family properties and polyculture, occupying forest lands (public lands) neglected by large landowners. The beginning, however, was traumatic: immigrants were sent into virgin areas without minimum infrastructure. The lack of roads and inadequate agricultural support forced many settlements to the brink of subsistence.

The initial migratory flow was intense until imperial funding was interrupted in 1830. The early success of colonies such as São Leopoldo (1824–1830) was due to its strategic location near Porto Alegre, which facilitated the flow of subsistence goods and handicrafts to the internal market, in addition to continuous state subsidies until 1830. São Leopoldo experienced rapid demographic growth, rising from 126 immigrants in July 1824 to more than 5,000 inhabitants in 1830, consolidating itself as a center of smallholdings producing corn, beans, tobacco, and lard. In contrast, settlements in isolated regions stagnated due to lack of infrastructure and poor-quality land.

The colony of São Pedro de Alcântara, founded in 1829, faced severe difficulties in its early years due to geographic isolation, lack of effective transportation routes to the coast, insufficient continuous government support, and inadequate resources for initial subsistence. This resulted in demographic stagnation, abandonment of plots, and secondary migration to more dynamic regions.

The table below details the evolution in the number of immigrants settled in the main nuclei of the period:

Population of the Main German Colonies (1824–1830)
Colony / Region	Province	Foundation	Population (1824)	Population (1830)	Predominant Profile
São Leopoldo	Rio Grande do Sul	1824	124	~4,850	Farmers and former soldiers
São Pedro de Alcântara	Santa Catarina	1829	—	~630	Families from the Hunsrück and soldiers
Santo Amaro	São Paulo	1827	—	~250	Farmers and artisans
Rio Negro / Mafra	São Paulo / SC (currently Paraná)	1829	—	~120	Colonists in transit and military personnel
Nova Friburgo	Rio de Janeiro	1824*	350	~500	German reinforcement in a Swiss settlement
Sources: ROCHE (1969); SCHRÖDER (1924). *Date of arrival of the first Germans.

=== The second phase of immigration (1845–1914) ===
After 1845, immigration resumed with the founding of a German colony in Rio de Janeiro, in Petrópolis. In the South, the German settlements of São Leopoldo expanded into the vale do rio dos Sinos and in Santa Catarina three new colonies emerged in the valleys of the Cubatão and Biguaçu rivers. At that time, political debates intensified regarding the advisability of bringing Germans to Brazil, due to the arrival of many Lutherans in a country where the Catholic religion was official. Despite opposing voices, beginning in 1847 Germans were recruited under the partnership system on the coffee plantations of São Paulo, an experience that did not yield results and, in the same year, 38 families from the Hunsrück and Hesse founded the colony of Santa Isabel, in Espírito Santo.

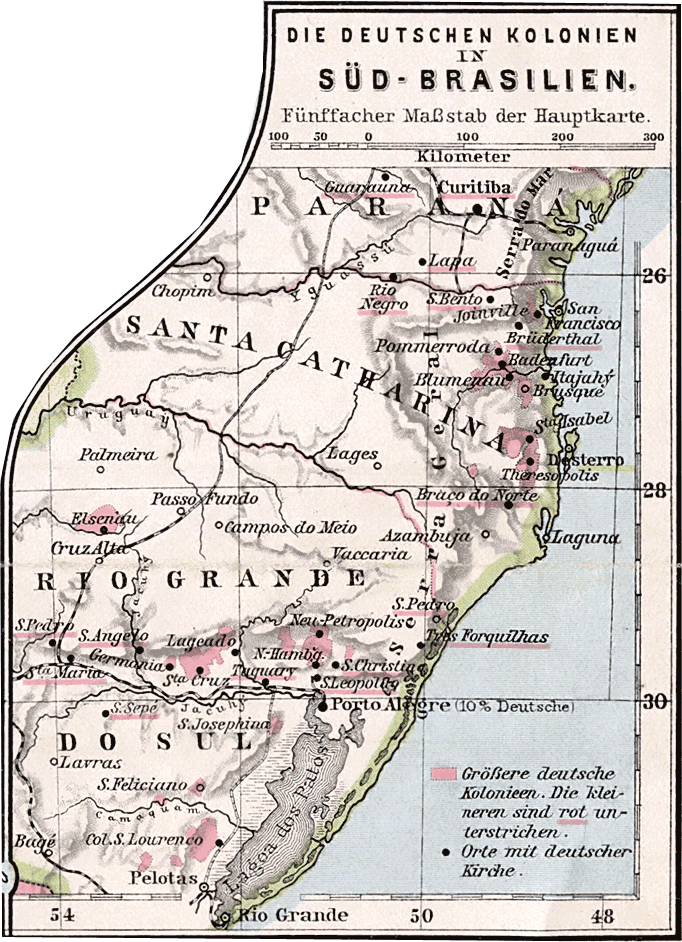
Map showing the dispersion of German colonies in Southern Brazil, in 1905.

After 1850, fundamental changes were made to attract a larger number of immigrants. The expenses with land demarcation and settlement of colonists were transferred from the imperial government to the provinces. Aiming to reduce its expenditures, the State allowed the operation of private colonization companies, which purchased land and resold it to immigrants. In 1850, the Lei de Terras established that, to gain access to land in Brazil, the individual would have to pay for it, rather than simply take possession, as had previously occurred. In 1858, 1,200 German immigrants were introduced into Juiz de Fora, Minas Gerais, at the initiative of the entrepreneur Mariano Procópio.

In 1859, the government of Prussia issued the so-called Heydt Rescript, a circular that curtailed propaganda and private emigration drives from Prussia to Brazil. This was a direct result of the Ibicaba Revolt, in São Paulo. On this coffee plantation, owned by Senator Nicolau Pereira de Campos Vergueiro, immigrants of various European nationalities revolted against the poor working conditions. The uprising had repercussions in Europe, leading the Prussian government to block emigration to Brazil. With the German Unification in 1871, this prohibition was extended to the entire country, being fully revoked only in 1896 (although immigration to the three southern states had been allowed earlier). This contributed to the concentration of German immigration in Rio Grande do Sul and Santa Catarina. In this context, Germans did not form a significant part of the workforce in the Brazilian coffee cycle, where Italians predominated and, after the Prinetti Decree, Spaniards, Portuguese, and Japanese.

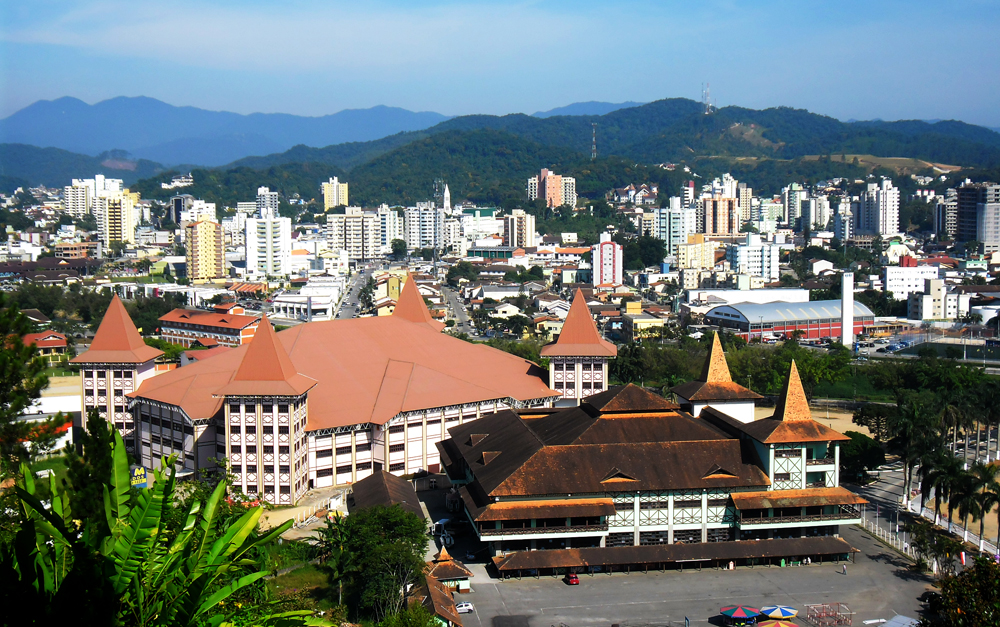
View of the city of Brusque, in Santa Catarina, founded in 1860 by German immigrants.

Until the end of the Empire, 80 German colonies were created, most of them in the basin of the rio Jacuí, reaching the edge of the Serra Gaúcha. With the advent of the Republic, several other important colonies, such as Ijuí, were created by the government. Most, however, arose from the initiative of private companies. Between 1824 and 1922, 142 German colonies were created in Rio Grande do Sul and between 1824 and 1914, it is estimated that 48,000 Germans immigrated to this state.

In Santa Catarina, German immigration was largely the result of private initiative. The German Hermann Blumenau arrived in southern Brazil in 1846 and attempted to receive free land from the Brazilian government to create a German colony, but the request was denied. Undeterred, he formed a partnership with his compatriot Ferdinand Hackradt and they themselves purchased a tract of land near the Ribeirão Garcia. In 1850, Dr. Blumenau traveled to Germany to recruit settlers and, with great difficulty, returned to Brazil with the 17 pioneers. In 1860, Dr. Blumenau sold his lands to the imperial government and, in 1880, the colony became the municipality of Blumenau, then counting 15,000 inhabitants, mostly Germans, Austrians, and Italians. In 1851, colonization began in another region of Santa Catarina with the founding of the Colônia Dona Francisca, currently Joinville. The lands on which the colony was later established were part of the marriage dowry between Princess Francisca of Brazil, sister of Emperor Pedro II, and François d'Orléans, Prince of Joinville. Facing a financial crisis, in 1849 François ceded 8 leagues of his lands in Santa Catarina to the German senator Christian Mathias Schroeder, with the aim of establishing a colony of immigrants there. The senator sent an engineer and his son to Santa Catarina to provide the necessary infrastructure for the arrival of the first immigrants. In 1851, the first settlers arrived and, until 1888, Joinville received 17,000 German-speaking immigrants, most of them Lutherans and farmers.

In Santa Catarina, the consolidation of these settlements depended on strict statutes that required absolute commitment from immigrants to productivity and self-management. To ensure economic and social viability, colony directors imposed severe rules that punished idleness and delegated to the settlers full responsibility for basic infrastructure, such as education and religion, without state assistance. This rigor was seen as the only guarantee against failure amid geographic isolation.

Beyond bureaucratic and political tensions, daily life in the Blumenau Colony was defined by a constant struggle with an unpredictable tropical ecosystem hostile to European agricultural methods. Geographic isolation in the Itajaí Valley intensified the challenges, as the lack of roads hindered medical assistance and the transport of any production that survived the climatic and biological adversities of the region.

Overcoming these obstacles and transitioning to prosperity occurred through technical adaptation and associativism. The Germans learned to manage tropical crops, developed drainage systems and, above all, invested in economic diversification: what was not consumed or destroyed by floods underwent artisanal processing in small workshops. Over time, this resilience transformed backyard workshops into large industrial complexes, while credit and educational cooperatives ensured the financial stability necessary to withstand the cycles of flooding of the Itajaí River, consolidating Blumenau as a national economic hub.

In Paraná, after the failure of the Rio Negro colony, an urban German community was established in Curitiba even before 1840. During the second half of the 19th century, most Germans in the state came from Joinville, reaching Paraná via the road opened by the Hamburg Company. It is important to highlight the migratory flow of Volga Germans from Russia to the province between 1877 and 1879. The peak of immigration in the state occurred only at the beginning of the 20th century, with the occupation of the eastern and southern regions of the state by immigrants directly from Germany and by migratory flows coming from the other southern states of Brazil.

With the German Unification in 1871, the posture of the Brazilian government toward Germans changed. Previously, with Germany fragmented, the national origin of immigrants did not represent a threat. However, the advent of a unified, powerful, and ambitious Germany made the Brazilian government cautious. As a result, Rio Grande do Sul stopped subsidizing German immigration and turned more intensively toward Italian immigrants.

In the first census carried out in Brazil, that of 1872, the presence of 45,829 people born in Germany was recorded in the country, placing them third among the foreign population, after the 183,140 Africans (the census did not provide regional breakdowns) and the 121,246 Portuguese. German immigrants were distributed as follows by province:

Population born in Germany (census of 1872)
Province	Number
Rio Grande do Sul	16,662
Santa Catarina	12,216
Minas Gerais	4,573
São Paulo	3,731
Rio de Janeiro	2,504
Paraná	1,670
Município Neutro	1,459
Espírito Santo	567
Others	2,447
Total	45,829

=== The third phase of immigration (1914–1969) ===
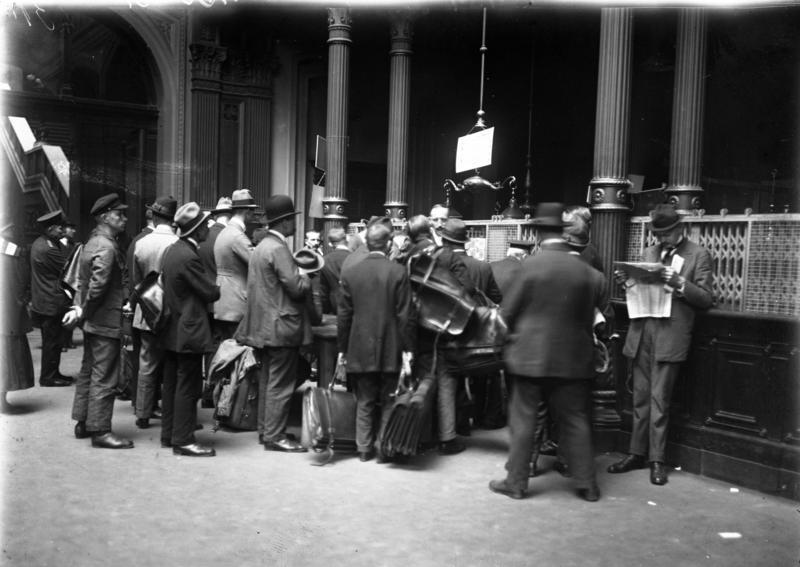
Men transporting money in suitcases, in Berlin, July 1923. A consequence of the hyperinflation in the Weimar Republic.

In the first half of the twentieth century, German immigration to Brazil reached a numerical volume greater than that recorded during the entire nineteenth century. Between 1918, the end of World War I, and 1933, the year of Adolf Hitler’s rise to power, approximately 80,000 Germans disembarked in the country. During the crisis of the Weimar Republic, hyperinflation reached astronomical levels in Germany, peaking in November 1923, when one U.S. dollar was worth 4.2 trillion marks, wiping out middle-class savings and rendering industrial wages virtually worthless. In 1924 alone, 21,016 German immigrants entered Brazil, making it the year with the highest number of German arrivals in the country, a volume driven by the severe economic crisis and hyperinflation. The increase in immigration to Brazil was also influenced by U.S. legislation that imposed strict quotas and monthly entry limits; once these were quickly reached, German immigration was blocked in the second half of 1923 and in 1924, forcing surplus emigrants to seek alternative destinations. As a result, the number of German entries into Brazil in that year was nearly equivalent to that of the United States.

While Germany faced financial crisis, Brazil was experiencing rapid urbanization and industrial diversification, with average industrial GDP growth of around 6% per year during the 1920s, urgently demanding the technical expertise that was abundant in Germany. This economic imbalance—on the one hand, diminishing prospects in Germany, and on the other, Brazil’s demand for modernization—explains the entry of more than 70,000 immigrants during that decade alone, many of whom brought patents and machinery to establish companies operating in currencies and markets far more stable than the German one.

In contrast to the agrarian profile of the earlier waves, immigration during the interwar period assumed a markedly urban character, attracting skilled workers and craftsmen as well as intellectuals and members of a middle class ruined by hyperinflation. Regarding this shift, Giralda Seyferth states:

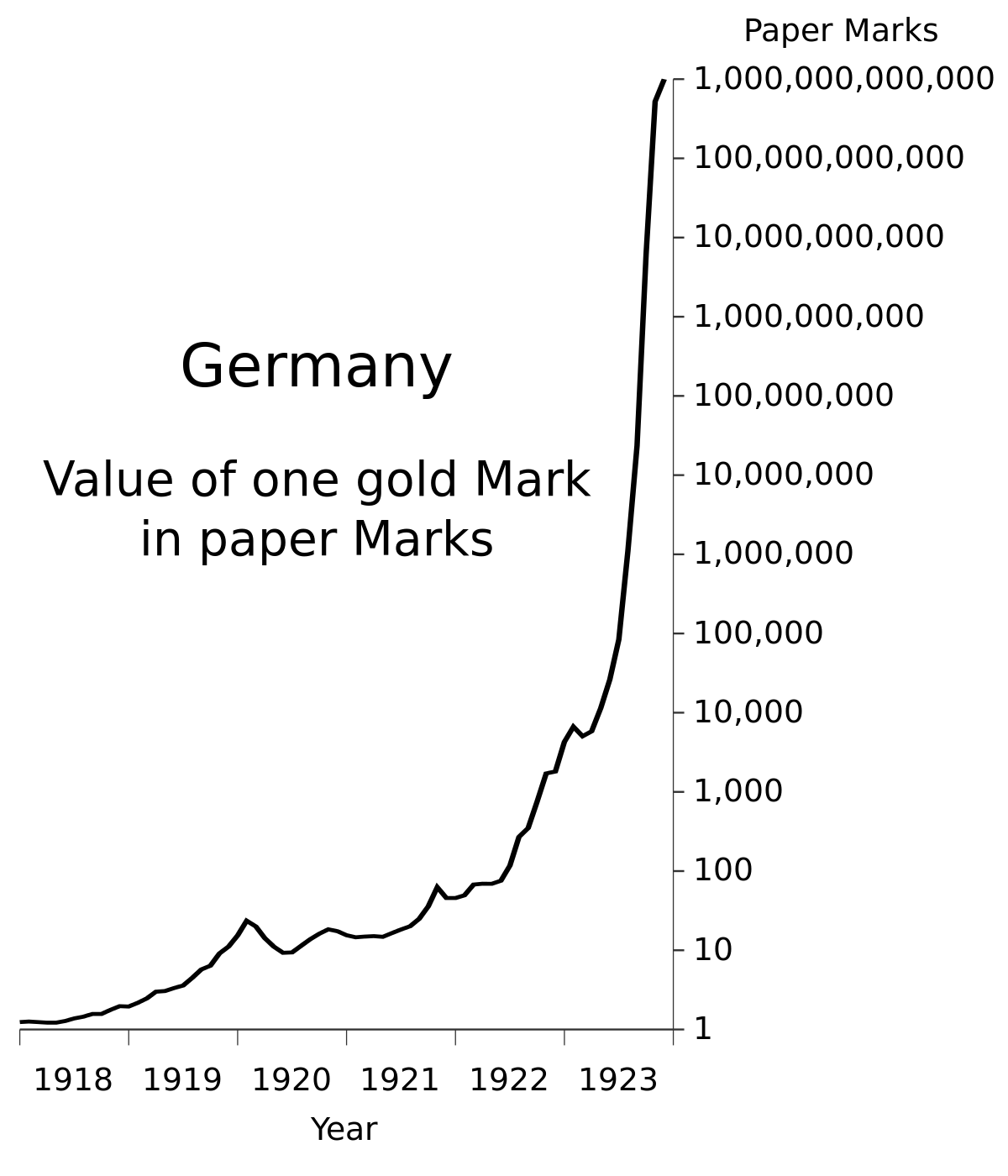
Graph showing the exponential rise of inflation in Germany between 1918 and 1923.

From 1918 onward, German immigration to Brazil took on a markedly urban character. There was a clear decline in the participation of farmers and a significant increase in qualified professionals, artisans, technicians, and members of the German lower middle class, who no longer sought the isolation of agricultural colonies but instead integrated into urban centers and industries, working as specialized labor.

— Giralda Seyferth, German Immigration and Culture in Brazil (1990).

A significant portion of this new wave settled in major urban centers, particularly in the city of São Paulo. By 1940, the state of São Paulo already housed 33,397 Germans, the majority residing in the capital.

Meanwhile, in southern Brazil, intense internal mobility was taking place, driven by the phenomenon that Jean Roche termed “swarming.” This process was triggered by the high birth rates among Germans in the pioneer colonies; the successive division of original plots among large families—often with more than ten children—reduced properties to economically unviable sizes. Faced with land saturation, the sons and grandsons of Germans were forced to migrate en masse from the “old colonies” of Rio Grande do Sul to other parts of the state and later to western Santa Catarina and Paraná, reproducing the smallholding model in new frontier areas in search of fertile land.

German immigrants of this period stood out for their high levels of education compared to the Brazilian population and to other immigrant nationalities. Data from the Port of Santos (1908–1936) indicate that only 3.9% of Germans entering Brazil were illiterate. By comparison, the highest illiteracy rate was among Spanish immigrants, at 65.1%, while Brazil's national average illiteracy rate, according to the 1920 census, exceeded 70%. The 2022 Brazilian census found that 7% of Brazilians over the age of 15 were still illiterate, a rate that remains higher than that of German immigrants who arrived in the early twentieth century. In addition, Germans had the lowest proportion engaged in rural occupations, reflecting the technical and urban profile of the new migratory wave.

Rurality and illiteracy among immigrants entering through the Port of Santos (1908–1936)
Nationalities	Over 7 years old	% Illiterate	% Rural Occupation
Germans	39,724	3.9%	31%
Japanese	142,573	9.9%	99%
Italians	175,157	31.6%	50%
Portuguese	242,657	51.8%	48%
Spaniards	167,795	65.1%	79%
Source: Adapted from SCOTT (2008).

The 1940 census marked the statistical peak of the German presence in Brazil, recording 97,091 persons born in Germany. However, contemporary estimates indicated that the community of descendants (German Brazilians) had already reached one million people, in a national population of 40 million. Estimates for 1940 suggest that Germans and their descendants made up 22.34% of the population of Santa Catarina, 19.3% of Rio Grande do Sul, 6.9% of Paraná, and 2.5% of São Paulo.

Germans and German-Brazilian population estimates in Brazil
State / Region	Estimated population (c. 1937)	Estimated population (c. 1930)
Rio Grande do Sul	650,000	500,000
Santa Catarina	250,000	200,000
Paraná	100,000	30,000
São Paulo	—	82,000
Espírito Santo	—	30,000
Rio de Janeiro	—	20,000
Minas Gerais	—	10,000
Other states	150,000	4,000
Total	1,150,000	826,000

Regarding those born in Germany counted in the 1940 census, they were distributed as follows by state:

German-born population (1940 census)
State	Number
São Paulo	34,490
Rio Grande do Sul	18,120
Santa Catarina	13,140
Paraná	13,108
Federal District	10,185
Minas Gerais	2,263
Rio de Janeiro	2,211
Espírito Santo	746
Others	2,828
Total	97,091

From 1940 onward, the number of residents born in Germany began a steady decline, falling to approximately 51,000 by 1970, due to the end of large migratory flows and the aging of the interwar immigrant generation. The decline and subsequent extinction of German immigration as a mass movement in Brazil were determined by a convergence of internal and external factors that altered the cost–benefit balance of migration. In Brazil, the turning point occurred during the Estado Novo (1937–1945), when Getúlio Vargas's Nationalization Campaign prohibited instruction in foreign languages and the operation of ethnic associations, weakening the cultural appeal that Brazil had exerted over immigrants. Simultaneously, Brazil's entry into World War II in 1942 disrupted transport flows and financial remittances, extinguishing organized migration. After 1945, although there was a brief influx of refugees and technicians, the flow ceased definitively due to the German Economic Miracle; the rapid recovery of West Germany raised German living standards above Brazilian levels, transforming the former emigrant nation into a country of immigration.

== The colonies and the economy ==
=== The agricultural colonies ===
It seems to me that our good compatriots, in this free South American nature, where they are exposed to particular struggles against natural obstacles, develop even greater determination to resolve and act... Amid difficulties they began, but they conquered the soil, and those who in Germany were servants became masters by the right of work.

— Robert Avé-Lallemant – Journey through the Province of Rio Grande do Sul, 1858.

In Rio Grande do Sul, the colonies were organized along paths. A long and straight clearing was made through the middle of the forest (which would later become a road), along which immigrant lots were distributed. These lots were long and narrow, ranging from one hundred to two hundred acres. Settlers had to spend the first one or two years clearing the land before they could cultivate it — hence the need for government subsidies. Each family’s house was built next to the road, at a distance from the others. Several of these paths constituted a colony. The center of the colony was the Stadtplatz, a cluster of buildings that included a church, school, public offices, commercial establishments, workshops, and the mill.

In Santa Catarina, the paths were less common, and properties tended to be smaller than those in Rio Grande do Sul. The geography of Santa Catarina did not favor contiguous settlements, so German colonies tended to be separated by mountains and valleys from regions occupied by other ethnic groups, most frequently Italians.

Before the promulgation of the Land Law of 1850, the Brazilian government adopted a policy of subsidized colonization to attract European immigrants, including Germans. During this period, settlers received plots of land granted free of charge, in addition to initial material aid such as tools, seeds, draft animals, and maintenance subsidies during the first months of settlement. Possession of land was conditioned upon effective occupation and cultivation, but did not require payment in cash, which allowed immigrants with limited resources to settle and favored the rapid formation of small family agricultural properties in the first colonies of southern Brazil, such as São Leopoldo. This model, however, was gradually abandoned due to high costs for the State and parliamentary criticism, being replaced, from 1850 onward, by the purchase-and-sale regime instituted by the Land Law.

After the promulgation of the Land Law, German immigrants began to acquire land in Brazil predominantly through the installment purchase of lots in official or private colonies, in a system known as colonial debt. The lots were initially granted on a provisional basis, upon payment in installments that included the value of the land, demarcation costs, and, in many cases, transportation expenses, tools, and initial subsistence. Possession was conditioned upon continuous cultivation and residence on the lot, with the definitive title issued only after full settlement of the debt, a process that often extended for one or two decades. In cases of persistent default or abandonment, the land was reclaimed by the public authorities or by the colonizing companies and resold at public auction.

Parallel to the official colonies, private colonization companies, especially in Santa Catarina and Paraná, played a central role in land acquisition by German immigrants. These companies purchased large tracts of public or private land, divided them into small lots, and resold them on credit to settlers, often combining the sale of land with internal transportation services, the opening of paths, and the administrative organization of the colony. Direct purchases between individuals also occurred, especially in more advanced phases of colonization or among second-generation immigrants who had already accumulated capital, although this remained a minority mechanism compared to directed colonization.

Problems were frequent. There were delays in the demarcation of lots, deficiencies in property title records, and, in some cases, administrative restrictions on the cultivation of export crops imposed by provincial authorities with the aim of preserving production for the internal market and avoiding competition with large commercial plantations. The lands acquired by immigrants did not always present adequate soil and drainage conditions, which limited agricultural productivity. In addition, the distance from consumer centers and the precariousness of transportation routes hindered the commercialization of surpluses, compromising the ability to settle the so-called colonial debt. Due to these difficulties, full payment of the lot within the contractual term, usually five years, was rare, and issuance of the definitive title could take more than one or two decades.

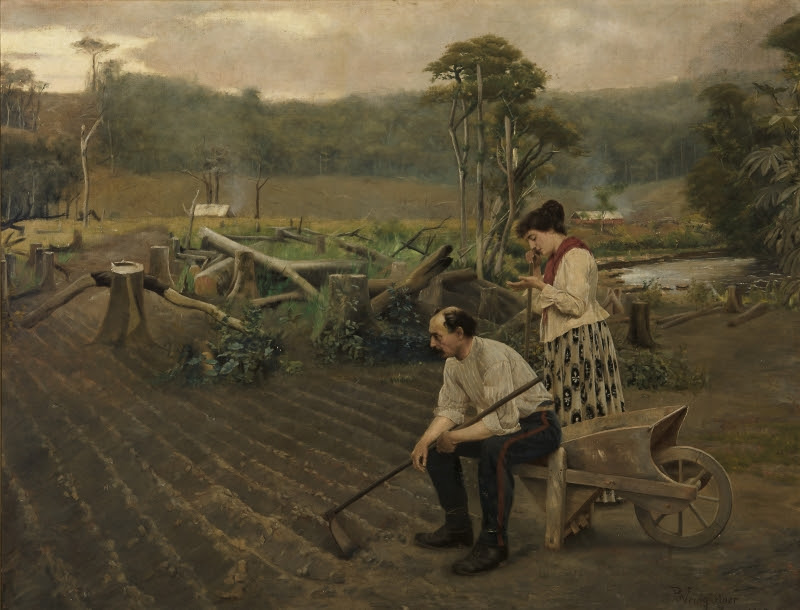
Tempora mutantur, 1889, by the German Brazilian painter Pedro Weingärtner, a work portraying German immigrants in the rural environment of Rio Grande do Sul.

In the early years, the economy of German colonies in Brazil was structured around small rural family properties organized under a polyculture regime, with the predominance of labor within the peasant domestic nucleus. Initial production was based on subsistence agriculture, aimed primarily at family consumption, with surpluses marketed in local stores or exchanged for manufactured goods. The agricultural techniques employed were simple, often adapted to local environmental conditions, and required a prolonged learning period, especially in areas of dense forest and newly opened soils.

From the second half of the 19th century onward, some colonies – especially in regions with better access to transportation routes and consumer markets, such as São Leopoldo, Blumenau, Brusque and Joinville – underwent a process of productive diversification. In these nuclei, the commercial cultivation of tobacco, pig farming, and dairy cattle raising spread, as well as agricultural processing through mills and atafonas, which expanded production aimed at the internal market and strengthened regional economic circuits.

In contrast, colonies located in areas of greater geographic isolation, such as parts of the interior of Espírito Santo and mountainous regions of Santa Catarina, faced greater difficulties in economic integration. In these locations, the precariousness of transportation routes, the distance from urban centers, and the lesser presence of artisans and merchants limited productive specialization, resulting in the prolonged maintenance of subsistence agriculture, with a low degree of mechanization and limited economic diversification.

The most economically influential social group in the colonies was that of merchants, mostly also of German origin, who became the local economic elite. In the early years, transactions between settlers and merchants were often carried out through barter due to the scarcity of currency. Geographic isolation favored the concentration of trade in a few stores, allowing some merchants to exercise near-monopolistic positions, which did not always result in balanced economic relations.

The accumulation of capital by these merchants was one of the central factors in the endogenous industrialization process of the colonies. Through the reinvestment of profits in agricultural processing, specialized craftsmanship and, later, in manufacturing industries, workshops and factories emerged that gave rise to regional industrial nuclei, although not all industrial initiatives originated directly from mercantile capital.

=== Urban and industrial development ===
In the second half of the 19th century, urban development and industrialization occurred simultaneously in some German colonies. In Blumenau and Brusque, a middle stratum was formed, composed of small merchants, artisans, specialized technicians, service providers, teachers, and public servants; a working class; and an elite composed mostly of merchants and industrialists. The industrial development of these colonies was influenced by the historical context of Germany itself in the 19th century. Unlike Brazil, by the mid-19th century the German states were already undergoing a relatively advanced phase of industrialization. Many immigrants possessed the know-how of modern productive processes, bringing with them the technical background of artisans and skilled technicians, which allowed the adaptation of European technologies to regional Brazilian needs.

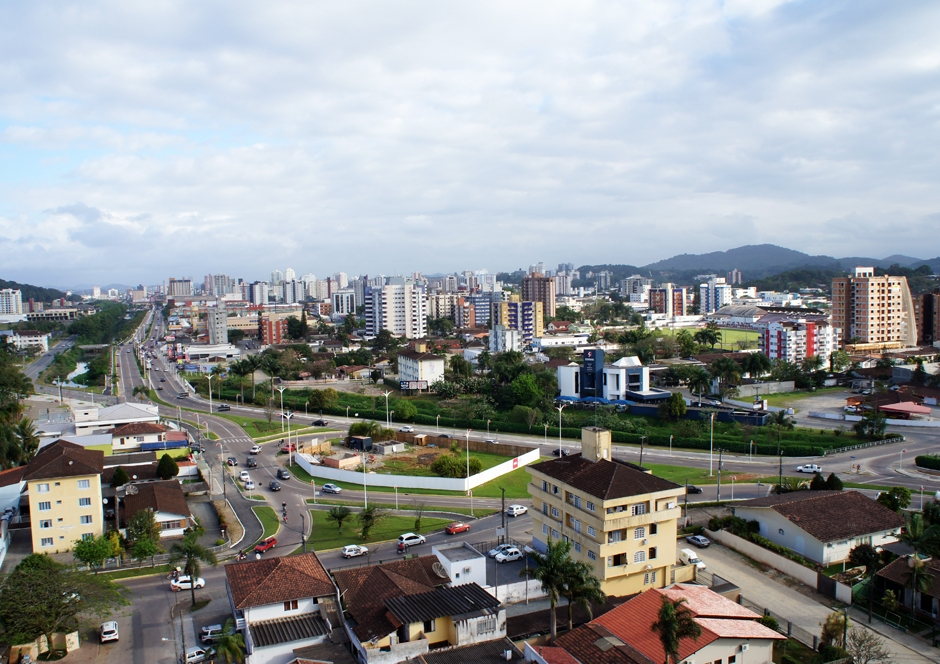
Founded by Germans, Joinville is the most populous city in the state of Santa Catarina.

The economic evolution of German colonies did not occur through a sudden leap, but through gradual maturation, which transformed the subsistence structure into an industrial complex. Initially, between 1824 and 1870, the phase of domestic craftsmanship predominated, aimed at self-consumption and local exchange, with profits systematically reinvested in the improvement of tools and the expansion of family labor. With the phenomenon of "swarming" and the consequent saturation of original lands, the production of surpluses – such as leather and pork lard, the so-called "white gold" — integrated the colonies into regional trade, allowing the accumulation of capital necessary for the acquisition of more complex machinery. From 1880 onward, this proto-industry reached the stage of full industrialization, when family weaving and tannery workshops, especially in the Sinos Valley and Itajaí Valley, began hiring wage labor and using external sources of motive power, giving rise to the major textile and footwear industries of southern Brazil.

The German colonization companies that operated in southern Brazil in the 19th century, especially those associated with Hermann Blumenau and the Hamburg Society, adopted a deliberate strategy of professional selection of immigrants, seeking to avoid exclusively agricultural colonies. Immigration records and reports from the period indicate the systematic presence of artisans — such as blacksmiths, carpenters, weavers and schoolmasters — alongside farmers, with the aim of creating diversified and self-sufficient local economies. This policy favored the internal circulation of goods and services, allowing the colonies, already in the first decades, to develop workshops, small manufacturing establishments and early forms of mechanization aimed at regional needs.

In 1852, the colony of Blumenau, founded two years earlier, had only slightly more than 100 inhabitants, but already counted “a doctor, a teacher, a gardener, a veterinarian, a blacksmith, a gunsmith, a turner, two tailors, two shoemakers, a sculptor-mason, a digger, three carpenters, a mill builder, a miller, two joiners and a cooper.” The others were farmers. Between 1850 and 1888, a total of 17,408 immigrants were introduced into the Dona Francisca colony (current Joinville), of whom 12,290 were Germans and 3,224 Austrians. Of the total, 12,911 (74.16%) were farmers; 2,288 (13.14%) artisans; 562 (3.23%) workers; and 1,647 (9.46%) from various professions. In 1857, São Leopoldo — despite the damages suffered during the Ragamuffin War — counted fifty-three carpenters and twenty-three blacksmiths, in addition to more specialized technical trades or those oriented toward the urban market, such as eight goldsmiths, four tinsmiths, two engravers and two turners. Textile and utility production was also significant, with eighteen weavers, twelve basket makers and ten broom makers. The basic services infrastructure was completed by twelve tailors, eight butchers, three locksmiths, three coopers and two rope makers. This concentration of skilled labor in a rural nucleus was atypical for the Brazilian agrarian pattern of the time, characterizing what historiography defines as protoindustrialization, which would serve as the basis for the future industrial pole of the Sinos Valley.

In 1857, São Leopoldo already presented a consolidated protoindustrial structure, characterized by a vast network of workshops and processing establishments:

Establishments and Workshops in São Leopoldo (1857)
Establishment / Workshop	Quantity	Establishment / Workshop	Quantity
Cassava flour mills	80	Brick kilns	7
Water-powered wheat mills	50	Sawmills	5
Water-powered oil presses	30	Breweries	5
Sugar mills and distilleries	28	Carriage manufacturing workshops	4
Cigar factories	12	Glue factories	4
Canoe workshops	8	Pottery workshops	3
Charcoal kilns	8	Hat-making workshops	2
Cigarette factories	7	Vinegar factory	1

Throughout the late 19th and early 20th centuries, the artisanal and cooperative base in the German colonies contributed to the formation of a regional industrial park, especially in nuclei such as Blumenau and Joinville, where family workshops evolved into small factories and, later, into large industrial companies. Historical studies and contemporary sources indicate that the presence of mutual aid associations, credit cooperatives and the local reinvestment of profits differentiated these colonies from other agrarian models of the period, favoring endogenous industrialization and the consolidation of a diversified regional economy. This model of autonomy and local reinvestment transformed small family businesses into major Brazilian industrial enterprises, such as the textile and metallurgical industries of Santa Catarina, consolidating what historians define as a "middle-class planning" approach that prioritized education and mechanization to the detriment of immediate profit from exports.

The transition from truck farming to industry was possible due to the immigrants' knowledge of simple production techniques, which were nonetheless more developed than those mastered by Brazilians. Furthermore, bilingualism and high literacy levels provided access to technical information and allowed for maintaining contacts in Europe to import equipment and specialized workers. In the 1930s, although they occupied less than 0.5% of Brazil's cultivable land, German communities generated 8% of Brazilian agricultural production. The Germans also had a strong presence in the commercial sector, extraction, and industry. They stood out in breweries, cigar factories, mining, textiles, and footwear, to the point of contributing 10% of the industry and 12% of Brazil's commerce at the time.

Even though farmers were the target audience of the Brazilian immigration policy, many of the German immigrants who arrived were not of rural origin, as can be seen from the table below:

German emigrants embarked in Hamburg, bound for Brazil, according to the occupations of male adults – 1851–1889
Occupations	Number	Percentage
Rural	3,085	47.83%
Artisans	1,284	19.91%
Merchants	129	2.0%
Economists/Stewards	159	2.47%
Technicians	177	2.75%
Laborers	1,297	20.11%
Others	154	2.39%
Unregistered	165	2.56%
Subtotal	6,450	100.0%

==== The importance of associativism and cooperative credit ====
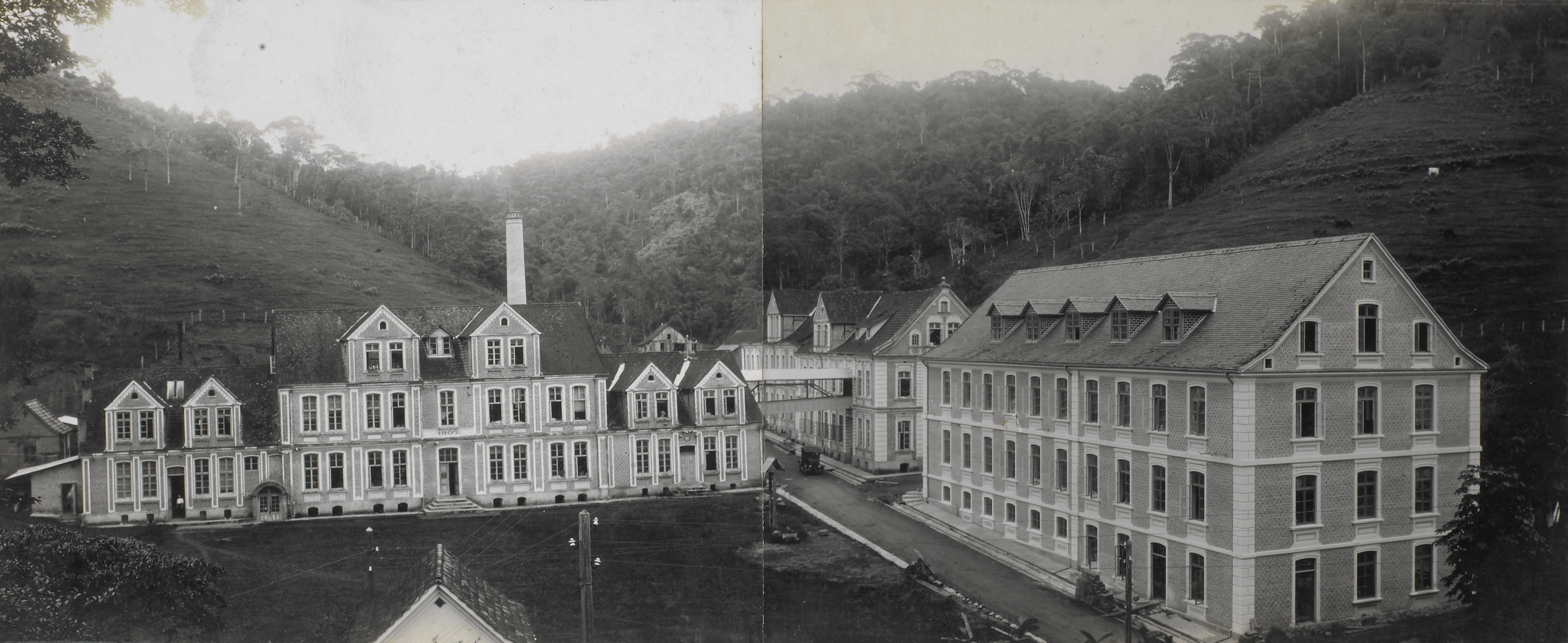
Clothing factory in Blumenau, Santa Catarina, in the 1920s.

Financial associativism was one of the pillars of the economic resilience of the German colonies in Brazil, manifesting primarily through mutual aid funds and the first credit cooperatives (such as the Raiffeisen model). The structuring of this autonomous financial ecosystem was a direct response to the fragility of the banking system of the Empire of Brazil and the First Brazilian Republic, which was highly centralized and almost exclusively oriented toward financing large-scale agriculture and the coffee-growing complex. Official credit was virtually inaccessible to small producers, which, under normal conditions, would have condemned family farmers to the cycle of subsistence agriculture, without capital to invest in technical innovation or expansion.

The cooperative system replaced the property guarantees required by urban banks with a "moral guarantee" based on community trust; the endorsement of a neighbor functioned as collateral for the loan, allowing for the mechanization of agriculture and the acquisition of incipient industrial equipment. In practice, this system operated through community solidarity: if a farmer needed, for example, to acquire modern machinery to process corn or a mechanical loom for his workshop, he did not turn to urban banks, which would have required land mortgages and prohibitive interest rates. Instead, the capital was provided by the local cooperative, where the “guarantee” was the honor and work record of the settler before his neighbors. By keeping capital circulating within the colony, these institutions ensured that profits were not drained by urban intermediaries, creating a “buffer” that made the colonies resilient to national crises. If the price of a product fell on the external market, the settler’s debt remained within the colony and could be renegotiated, without the risk of property loss to external institutions. This financial independence was fundamental for the transition from rural handicrafts to the industrial park of Santa Catarina and Rio Grande do Sul, promoting endogenous development that allowed German immigrants to become their own bankers and, eventually, their own industrialists.

=== Difficulties and stagnation of some colonies ===
Not all German colonies in Brazil experienced development above the Brazilian average. The disparity in the development of German colonies demonstrates that economic success did not depend solely on individual effort, but on a tripod composed of favorable geography, professional diversification, and access to markets. In colonies that “did not work” or stagnated, such as those in the interior of Espírito Santo and isolated nuclei in Minas Gerais and Rio de Janeiro (like the colony of Teófilo Otoni or Nova Friburgo, in their initial phases), geographic isolation acted as an insurmountable barrier. Colonies located on mountaintops or in hard-to-access areas suffered what Jean Roche classified as severe economic regression. Unlike the nuclei located in valleys, which prospered through trade, these groups, lacking access to roads or navigable rivers, became disconnected from consumer markets and lost contact with technical innovations and modern tools. Over time, commercial production was abandoned in favor of rudimentary subsistence agriculture, resulting in precarious living conditions that, in many cases, were inferior to those the immigrants had sought to leave behind in Europe. In these more isolated regions, the infant mortality rate was up to twice as high as in organized centers like Blumenau, due to lack of access to doctors and malnutrition. Some more isolated colonies of Rio Grande do Sul faced economic stagnation and processes of social anomie. In this context of isolation and strong influence of popular traditions of biblical-Protestant orientation, the movement of the Muckers arose between 1872 and 1874, in the region of Morro do Ferrabraz, in São Leopoldo, currently Sapiranga. A sect, led by a woman-prophet, Jacobina Mentz Maurer, gathered a group of religious fanatics who triggered a succession of crimes and murders. The believers were later massacred by imperial forces in the episode known as the Revolt of the Muckers.

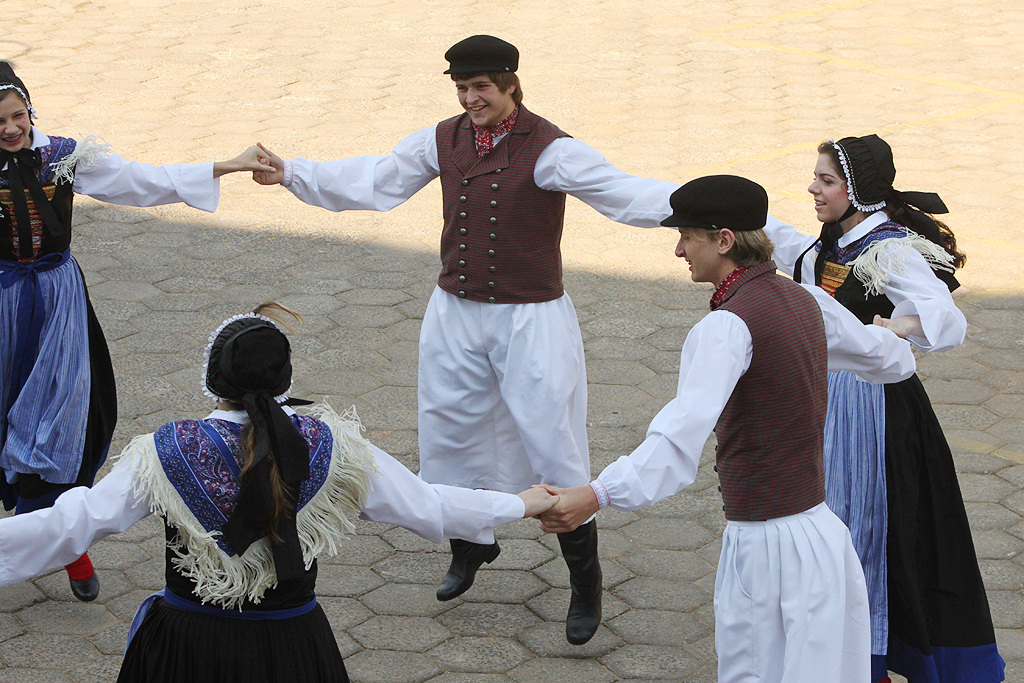
Descendants of German Pomeranians dancing in traditional costumes in Santa Maria de Jetibá, in the state of Espírito Santo.

The need for survival in isolated areas led many descendants of Germans into a process of forced acculturation, adopting agricultural techniques and lifestyles of rural Brazilian populations. Without capital for mechanization, these settlers began to use the system of burnings and coivara — rudimentary, low-productivity cultivation techniques – living in wattle and daub dwellings and replacing a rich diet (meat, dairy, breads) with a restrictive one (based on cassava and corn). This protein- and vitamin-poor diet resulted in deficiency diseases, such as goiter and chronic malnutrition, affecting the physical development of new generations of descendants. This phenomenon of economic regression, sometimes called "caboclization" or "peasantization," in which German settlers integrated into the mass of poor farmers in the interior of Brazil, demonstrates that the maintenance of German "technical culture" depended directly on economic success and contact with regional trade, disappearing in pockets of extreme poverty.

A notorious example of difficulties was the initial period of the colony of Santa Isabel, in Espírito Santo, where the extremely rugged topography hindered even the use of draft animals in certain areas. This "geographic stagnation" generated processes of social anomie and the weakening of community institutions, as the struggle for immediate survival under adverse conditions prevented reinvestment in education and community infrastructure – elements that were the foundation of progress in Santa Catarina and Rio Grande do Sul.

Another determining factor in the failure of some colonies was the lack of professional selection at the point of origin. Unlike Blumenau or Joinville, where there was planning to attract artisans and technicians who brought industrial know-how from Europe, many stagnating nuclei received exclusively peasants without diversified technical training. In the case of Espírito Santo, data from Helmar Rölke show that, of the 2,142 Pomeranians who arrived in the state between 1857 and 1873, only six were artisans (including carpenters, blacksmiths, masons and shoemakers); the vast majority consisted of day laborers who had worked on latifundia in Europe, without experience in manufacturing trades. In these places, the absence of blacksmiths, carpenters and mechanics prevented the maintenance of tools and the creation of small factories. In addition, the fragility or absence of credit cooperatives – fundamental in the South to finance mechanization – left these settlers at the mercy of usury or state neglect.

Impoverishment was also due to the demographic vigor of German families, which often exceeded ten children. Because of the custom of equal division of land among heirs, it is estimated that around 1900, in the oldest colonies of Rio Grande do Sul, between 25% and 30% of third-generation descendants no longer owned their own land. After successive generations of partition, the original lots, which measured from 48 to 77 hectares, were reduced to parcels of 5 to 10 hectares, and under the polyculture standard of the time, a lot smaller than 15 hectares was considered the "limit of misery," as it did not allow soil fallow nor the maintenance of draft and slaughter animals.

Families that did not have resources to finance migration to new agricultural frontiers gave rise to a mass of landless descendants of Germans, incapable of maintaining the standard of living of their ancestors due to the absolute lack of cultivable land. Many of these landless individuals formed a rural proletariat within the colonies; deprived of their own means of production, they began to work as sharecroppers or day laborers for more affluent neighbors or for the first agro-industries. This social stratum represented the failure of the ideal of "independent small property," forming a class of manual workers who lived on the margins of the prosperity displayed by the most successful centers. Others headed to expanding urban centers, such as Novo Hamburgo and São Leopoldo, which at the beginning of the 20th century had about 60% of their industrial labor force in the footwear sector composed of descendants of Germans who had “failed" in agriculture due to lack of land.

In the 1970s, the German writer Klaus Granzow visited Pomeranian colonies in the interior of Espírito Santo and reported his observations in the work Pomeranos Sob o Cruzeiro do Sul. Granzow highlighted the "poverty in agriculture resulting from the lack of agrarian policy and real incentives for rural workers." The writer reported, for example, encountering a group of women who "did not attend worship because they did not have a decent dress to wear." For Granzow, the Pomeranian community of Espírito Santo was not only stagnant, but had suffered technical and social regression; by losing contact with European innovations, the settlers reverted to rudimentary subsistence practices, clinging fervently to religion as the principal element of their identity. His reports illustrate what he defined as the "silent sadness" of a community excluded from Brazilian economic progress.

=== State investment and economic return ===
Immigration inflow to the Blumenau colony (1850–1880)
Period	Immigrants arrived	Total population	Money invested by the Brazilian government (réis)
1850–1854	308	—	—
1855–1859	509	943	—
1860–1864	1,541	2,027	199:840$572
1865–1869	1,973	5,861	333:561$724
1870–1874	1,051	7,156	267:811$210
1875–1879	3,930	13,976	—
1880	457	≈ 14,000	—
Total (1850–1880)	9,769	≈ 14,000	801:213$506 (documented total)

German immigration required substantial investments in transportation, maintenance, land demarcation, and basic infrastructure from the Brazilian government.

In Parliament, these expenditures generated heated debates, with deputies labeling German immigrants as "expensive guests" due to their initial burden on the National Treasury. Between 1824 and 1830 alone, spending in São Leopoldo exceeded 1,000 contos de réis; in Blumenau, investments in the 1860s and 1870s surpassed 800 contos.

Despite the high initial cost, researchers such as Leo Waibel classify the model as the Empire's "best deal" in the long run. The return manifested itself in import substitution and foreign-exchange savings: in 1829, only five years after its foundation, the Germans of São Leopoldo had already established eight wheat mills, eight tanneries, a soap factory, a stone-cutting mill, and even a weaving workshop. By the 1830s, São Leopoldo had consolidated itself as Porto Alegre's main supply center, providing a wide range of products such as beans, vegetables, and especially lard and leather. This surplus production was not limited to the Gaúcho capital; it was marketed to other cities in the region and even sent to Rio de Janeiro, helping to stabilize food prices and reducing the need for European imports.

According to Boris Fausto, the success of these colonies allowed Brazil to expand its food security, transforming the initial installation expenses into an engine of endogenous development.

The system of polyculture and small property generated a regional consumer market that fostered industrialization and the creation of self-sustaining urban networks, without requiring new state investments in infrastructure. The transition from colonial artisanal activity to manufacturing enabled these regions to become the embryo of a robust Brazilian industrial park, especially in the textile, metallurgical, and leather-footwear sectors.

In Blumenau, economic vigor was so pronounced that in 1860 – only ten years after its foundation – the imperial government decided to "purchase" Hermann Blumenau's colony for 200 contos de réis, transforming it into an official nucleus and collecting taxes on the production of sugar, molasses, and corn. By 1880, Blumenau's exports, mainly tobacco and manufactured goods, already far exceeded the province's maintenance costs for the colony.

Management also influenced costs: Joinville (a private partnership) minimized state expenses with maritime transportation, as the Hamburg Colonization Society assumed the financial risk.

Unlike latifundia — which often accumulated debts with the Treasury or enjoyed exemptions — the economy in German colonies generated constant revenue through tithes and patents, becoming surplus-generating within a few decades. Productive diversification and the emergence of urban nuclei within the colonies significantly expanded the state’s tax base, and German smallholders regularly contributed taxes on consumption, industrial patents, and merchandise circulation fees, financing the expansion of the regional administrative apparatus.

In contrast, colonies located in rugged geographies (such as those in Espírito Santo) took longer to integrate into the market, offering primarily geopolitical returns in terms of sovereignty and territorial occupation.

Historiographically, there is a debate between Celso Furtado’s view – which regarded the colonies as isolated "archipelagos" with limited immediate contribution to capital accumulation – and authors such as Waibel and Roche, who emphasize the social impact and the tax and industrial base left to the South. Recent studies confirm that areas of European colonization historically maintained income and development indicators above the Brazilian national average, reinforcing the interpretation of the migration project as successful in promoting the country's endogenous development.

Thus, specialized historiography tends to conclude that, although German colonization represented a high cost to the imperial state in the short term, its positive economic effects manifested themselves in the medium and long term through territorial occupation, the dynamization of regional economies, and the formation of internal markets.

== Nationalization and assimilation ==
The situation of Germans in Brazil was peculiar because, although nationally few in number, they were deeply concentrated in certain areas of the South, often in relative isolation. As northern Europeans, Germans differed from the broader Brazilian population and maintained a language and culture significantly distinct from those prevailing in Brazil. They managed to preserve their language, and hundreds of thousands of second- and third-generation German Brazilians were barely able to speak Portuguese. This differentiation fostered a sense of minority identity, allied with the formation of solid ethnic institutions such as schools, churches, social associations, and a German-language press. All these elements combined to promote a general feeling of "cultural superiority".

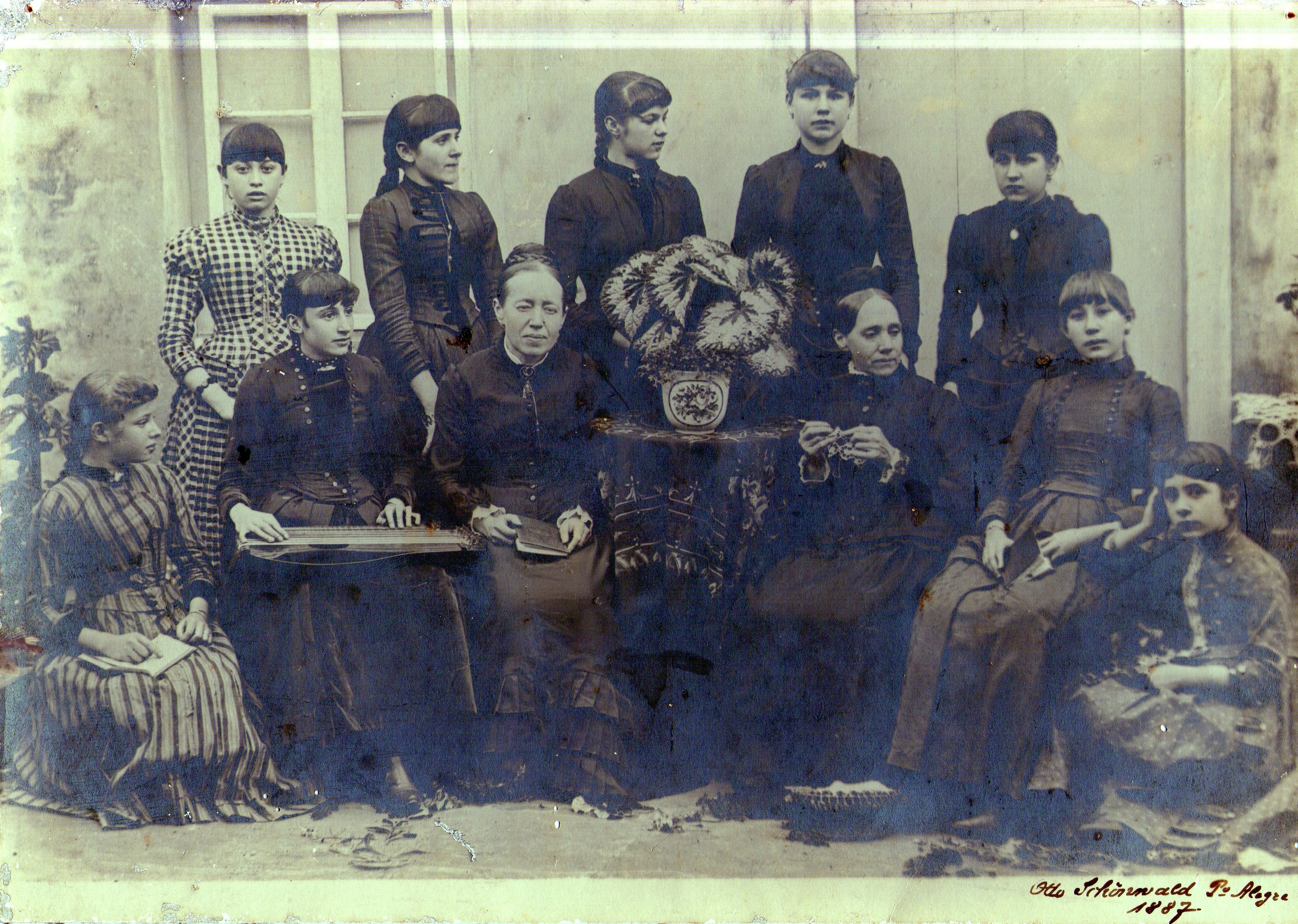
Students at the Evangelical school in Novo Hamburgo, in 1886. Descendants of Germans, particularly Protestants, were accused by certain sectors of Brazilian society of not being "Brazilian enough".

This scenario began to attract the attention of the Brazilian elite at the end of the 19th century. Although German immigrants were welcomed and valued for their contributions to Brazilian development, the image Brazilians held of Germans was based on inadequate and distorted information, rhetorical exaggerations, and myths. When the Brazilian elite attempted to identify the typical German attitude, they tended to focus on German Brazilian idealists. The average German Brazilian attached little importance to cultural assimilation; however, there was a group of immigrants who delivered speeches and published texts defending the right of Germans to maintain cultural separatism in Brazil, at a time when nationalist propaganda was growing in Germany and beyond. As a result, Brazilian authorities feared that German Brazilians in the South were becoming so numerous that they would never be assimilated. This marked the beginning of the so-called "German danger", a widespread belief that Germany was expanding its imperialism worldwide, partly based on the presence of German immigrants in various developing countries, including Brazil.

In the early 20th century, Brazilian intellectual production consolidated the myth of the "German danger" (perigo alemão) through works that blended geopolitical concerns with theories on the country's racial and cultural unity. The main champion of this trend was Sílvio Romero, who in O Alemanismo no Sul do Brasil described German colonies as unassimilable "cysts" (quistos) and warned of a possible disintegration of the national territory in the face of Germanic influence. Romero predicted that, without intervention, Southern Brazil would become a de facto German province, even if nominally Brazilian. He used the term "decomposition of nationality" to explain his ideas. Complementing this view from a sociological perspective, Oliveira Vianna, in works such as Populações Meridionais do Brasil, argued that the ethnic isolation of German immigrants prevented the "unification of the national soul," treating the Germanic presence as a foreign body that should be dissolved through miscegenation and state intervention. In the field of political rhetoric, authors such as Cândido Motta Filho popularized the metaphor of the "Germanic octopus," whose tentacles of influence were supposedly strangling Brazilian sovereignty in the South, creating an environment of distrust that would culminate in the linguistic and cultural repression of the Vargas Era.

Added to this was the fact that Brazilians of German origin were generally better educated and, as a rule, wealthier than most Brazilians, thus holding significant economic power, though limited political influence. In a poor country dominated by high illiteracy rates, the relative prosperity of the German community tended to provoke antagonism, despite the officially proclaimed Brazilian benevolence and tolerance. In this context, some members of the Brazilian government insisted on the need to fragment German colonies and ensure that new settlements were composed of individuals from various ethnic backgrounds.

The ordinary Brazilian generally maintained an attitude ranging between distrust and hostility toward the German immigrant. Public opinion became more forceful after the Unification of Germany, with the perception that relations between the southern Brazilian colonies and Germany could trigger a movement threatening Brazil's territorial integrity. This idea persisted, with varying intensity, for nearly forty years, until World War I, and was propagated by various intellectuals, particularly through the works of Sílvio Romero, a prominent advocate of the "German danger" thesis.

Suspicion of anti-Brazilian sentiment was reinforced by religious differences, particularly the presence of Lutheran immigrants; by the relative isolation of settlers in remote areas; by the lack of official schools and, consequently, the absence of Portuguese-language education for immigrants' children; and by the commercial success of some immigrants, who came to dominate certain local markets. This led to situations in which local politicians, such as João José Pereira Parobé, declared that they preferred the state's economic backwardness to seeing prosperity depend on peoples of Germanic origin.

Antipathy toward Germany was also fueled by certain diplomatic episodes, among them:

1. the declared desire of the German government to acquire a colony in the Americas;
2. the unauthorized landing of German sailors from the gunboat Panther in Santa Catarina in 1905 to search for and arrest a sailor accused of desertion;
3. the 1906 maneuver to raise coffee prices led by the German Hermann Sielcken. Although the maneuver was successful, the consortium dissolved in 1913, and part of its funds were confiscated by the German government at the outbreak of World War I.

This fear, however, was largely unfounded, since most immigrants had emigrated before German reunification, and their affection and sense of reciprocity toward the homeland were directed toward their village or family rather than toward the nation-state. These pioneer immigrants and the Brummers who arrived in 1851, when receiving the post-reunification groups (the Reichsdeutsche or "Germans of the Empire"), did not get along well with them, considering them overly erudite, excessively attached to their region of origin, and defenders of a country that had little connection to their own history.

Jean Roche maintains that the supposed "cultural resistance" of German immigrants was, in reality, the result of a "colonization of isolation" practiced by the Brazilian government itself, which confined settlers to plots embedded in mountains and forests far from Luso-Brazilian urban centers. This policy created physical barriers that limited the immigrant's life to a radius of a few kilometers, where all interactions—from trade to church—occurred in German, making the learning of Portuguese an impractical task due to a lack of social use. Consequently, the creation of a school infrastructure in the German language was not an act of political rebellion, but a pragmatic response to the absence of the State, which failed to send official teachers or schools to these regions, leaving the German immigrant with the alternative of organizing their own educational system to prevent their children's illiteracy.

Robert Christian Avé-Lallemant, in Viagem pelo Sul do Brasil no ano de 1858, recorded that, far from any deliberate resistance, there was a sincere desire among the Germans for their children to learn Portuguese, seen as the language necessary for full citizenship and social advancement. The chronicler observed that linguistic isolation was the result of a lack of public instruction rather than hostility toward Brazilians, with whom the immigrants maintained relationships of cordiality and cooperation in daily rural life. Avé-Lallemant added that, instead of getting lost in vain theories about nationalization, if the government were to send a single Portuguese teacher, the entire colony would receive them with festivities. This view is corroborated by Karl Heinrich Oberacker Jr., who emphasizes how the German immigrant felt deeply grateful to Brazilian soil but maintained the German language as a trait of cultural identity, which did not nullify their political loyalty to Brazil. Oberacker Jr. argues that, ironically, the Germans were those who most helped to secure Brazil's southern borders against Platine invasions, being, therefore, more "Brazilian" in practice than the intellectuals from Rio de Janeiro who criticized them.

=== The nationalization campaign ===
"As we can observe, Germanic colonization took deep roots, developed throughout southern Brazil and would have assumed terrifying proportions had it not been for the timely measures adopted to defend the sacred interests of the Fatherland and dismantle any possibility of territorial disintegration" (Rui Alencar Nogueira, Brazilian army officer – 1947).

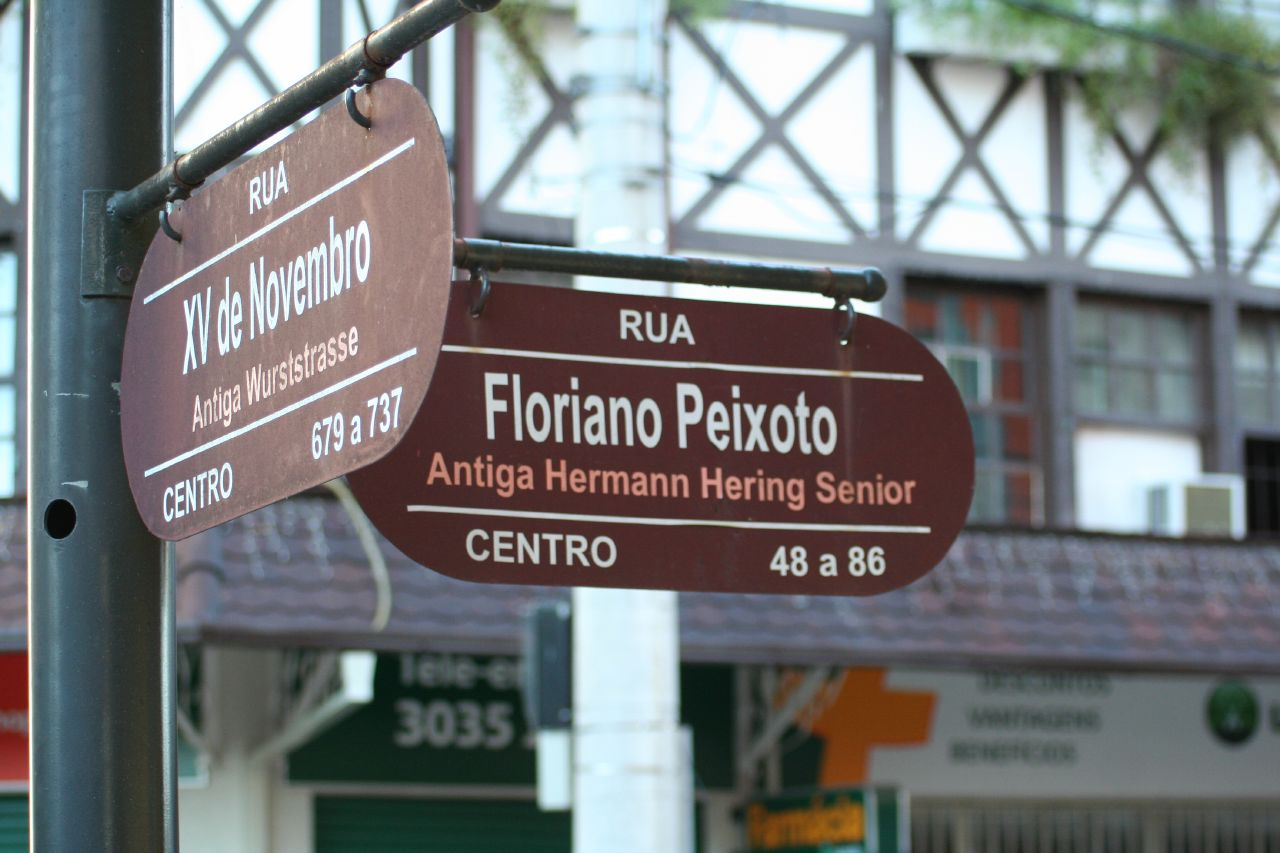
During the Nationalization campaign, streets with German names had their nomenclature changed. This is a sign in Blumenau showing the former and current street names.

Between 1937 and 1945, a significant portion of the Brazilian population experienced interference in their private lives as a result of a "nationalization campaign". This population – labeled "alien" by the Brazilian government – consisted of immigrants and their descendants. Both the Brazilian Empire and the First Republic had allowed immigrant groups to settle in relatively isolated communities, especially in southern Brazil. These communities did not fully assimilate into Brazilian society, a fact that concerned the nationalist government of President Getúlio Vargas. The army played a central role in this process of forced assimilation in areas of "foreign colonization", where the so-called "ethnic cysts" were said to exist in Brazil.

Proponents of compulsory nationalization, grounded in a positivist and military nationalism, viewed German colonies as "ethnic cysts" (quistos étnicos) that threatened Brazil's biological and political integrity. Intellectuals such as Oliveira Vianna and Sílvio Romero feared that the maintenance of a foreign language, religion, and customs would create a "State within a State," hindering the formation of a unified "national soul" and facilitating eventual territorial secession or annexation by Germany. From this perspective, the expansion of Germanic communities was interpreted as the advance of an "octopus" whose tentacles would strangle Brazilian sovereignty in the South, transforming a demographic growth phenomenon into a national security emergency that justified drastic State intervention in the private lives and culture of immigrants and their descendants.

Military officers linked to the magazine A Defesa Nacional reinforced the idea that the expansion of Germans in the South through "daughter colonies" was a form of "territorial invasion without the use of arms." They described the advance of settlers into new lands as an "oil slick" (mancha de óleo) that displaced the national element (the caboclo), comparing this expansion to the barbarian invasions that culminated in the fall of the Roman Empire. Giralda Seyferth details how the term "invasion" was used to disqualify German immigrants and justify state intervention, while René Gertz analyzes how the Brazilian press and military circles used the fear of a "territorial conquest without weapons" to transform German peasants into a threat to national sovereignty, validating the repression of the Vargas Era.

Brazilians of German origin perceived themselves as part of a plural society, so that "Deutschtum" (the sense of belonging to a community of shared German ancestry) seemed compatible with their Brazilian citizenship. However, the Brazilian government adhered strictly to the principle of jus soli, requiring that all individuals born in Brazil identify exclusively as Brazilians and abandon other ethnic affiliations. This view contrasted with the jus sanguinis principle prevalent among German descendants who, at the time, often maintained emotional ties to their ancestral homeland.

In fact, even after generations in Brazil, many descendants of Germans still felt strongly connected to their ancestral land. An important testimony is that of the Brazilian writer Lya Luft, born in the colony of Santa Cruz do Sul:

In my family we used to say "us, the Germans, and them, the Brazilians". It was crazy, because we had been in Brazil for generations. And since I was a very questioning little girl, one day, at age 7 or 8, during Patriotic Week, I realized: "Why do they say 'die Brasilianer und wir'?" I want to be Brazilian (…) I was born in 1938 and soon after the war began. At home we spoke German, but then I had to speak Portuguese because German was prohibited. My grandmothers spoke German. None of them ever knew Germany. I remember them always reading. That is something beautiful I inherited from them — an entire imaginary world of fairy tales.

In the 1930s, Brazil hosted one of the largest German populations outside Germany: approximately 100,000 German-born residents and nearly one million Brazilians of German descent, whose ancestors had been settling in the country since 1824. The Vargas dictatorship sought to eradicate any form of national identification that did not align with the regime’s ideological project. Strongly influenced by Gilberto Freyre’s Casa-Grande & Senzala, which portrayed Brazilians as the product of racial miscegenation, the elimination of ethnic enclaves became a national objective. Restrictions began in 1938, but the situation deteriorated significantly after Brazil declared war on the Axis powers in 1942. All schools were required to teach exclusively in Portuguese, and publications in foreign languages (in practice, German and Italian) became subject to prior censorship by the Ministry of Justice. Members of the Brazilian Army were deployed to "foreign colonization" areas to monitor the local population. People were harassed and attacked for speaking German in public. The police monitored private lives, invading homes to burn books written in German. Many individuals were arrested simply for speaking German. In 1942, 1.5% of Blumenau's inhabitants were imprisoned for this reason

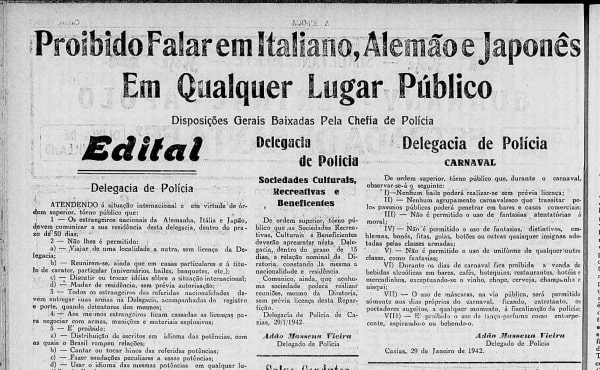
Police notice from Caxias in 1942, stating the prohibition of speaking Italian, German, and Japanese in public, as well as other restrictions imposed on citizens of Italy, Germany, and Japan.

The construction of the "New Brazilian Man" (Homem Novo Brasileiro) during the Vargas Era required the dissolution of established ethnic identities—such as those of Germans, Italians, and Japanese—in favor of a model of nationality based on miscegenation and exclusive loyalty to the State. To facilitate this project of standardization, the Vargas regime used the rhetoric of the "alien peril" (perigo alienígena), labeling immigrant communities as "spies" or "social cysts" (quistos sociais) that threatened the country's cohesion. This stigmatization served as a mechanism of social control, justifying the militarization of colonial zones through the deployment of the Army, the closing of foreign educational institutions, and the censorship of the ethnic press. These measures aimed to replace cultural pluralism with a centralized and monolingual national identity under the direct control of the central power in Rio de Janeiro.

In many Brazilian cities, numerous individuals – even those born in Brazil – did not know how to speak Portuguese. From one moment to the next, they were forbidden to speak the only language they knew, even at home, as the government deployed informants to monitor language use in private residences. The 1927 census in Blumenau showed that, although 84% of the city's population was born in Brazil, only 28% had Portuguese as their mother tongue, while 53% spoke German as their primary language. The repression of the German language during the Vargas government was therefore profoundly traumatic for many people.

The persecution of German speakers was even defended by intellectuals of the period, such as the writer Rachel de Queiroz, who, after visiting Blumenau, published the chronicle Olhos Azuis in the magazine O Cruzeiro. In the text, Queiroz criticized the way Blumenau's inhabitants spoke Portuguese, "with Germanic syntax and a horrible Germanic pronunciation", adding: "Someone must do something about this problem before it turns into a drama."

=== Nazism in Brazil ===
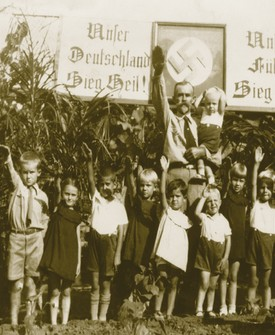
Children giving the Nazi salute in Presidente Bernardes, São Paulo (c. 1935)

With the rise of the Third Reich, the Nazi Party organized its largest overseas section in Brazil, reaching approximately 3,000 members. However, this figure represented only about 5% of German nationals residing in the country, with stronger adherence in São Paulo than in the rural colonies of the South. Contemporary historiography, led by authors such as René Gertz and Eliane Bisan Alves, argues that although there was a form of "pragmatic sympathy" for Germany's economic recovery, deep ideological adherence remained limited. Many party affiliations occurred out of "rational calculation", whether due to pressure from German companies operating in Brazil or in pursuit of benefits and international prestige associated with the new German power after the instability of the Weimar Republic.

The relationship between Nazism and the German-Brazilian community was marked by both internal and external conflicts. Ideologically, Nazism clashed with the Brazilian Integralist Action, which, although it attracted descendants of Germans, defended racial miscegenation in opposition to Germanic racial purity. Politically, the government of Getúlio Vargas, initially sympathetic and commercially aligned with Germany, banned the party in 1938 and subsequently invoked the pretext of the "German danger" to implement an aggressive policy of forced nationalization. This process culminated in tragic episodes during World War II, when Brazilians of German origin were called up by the Brazilian Expeditionary Force to fight in Europe, while southern colonial communities experienced looting and popular reprisals following the sinking of Brazilian ships by German submarines.

Finally, historians reject claims that Hitler planned a formal colonization of Brazil, classifying such narratives as wartime propaganda or political instrumentalization during the Vargas era to consolidate the Estado Novo. Likewise, current research indicates that there is no historical continuity between the Nazism of the 1930s and contemporary neo-Nazi groups, which are largely composed of young individuals without ties to the original immigration nuclei, but who appropriate Nazi symbols as an expression of social alienation, often reinforcing prejudiced stereotypes about southern Brazil.

== Demographics ==
=== Religion ===
Religion of Germans entering Rio Grande do Sul (1854–1874)
Period	Catholic	Other	Total
1854–1863	4 451	4 285	8 736
1864–1873	1 060	5 434	6 494
1874	64	293	357
Total	5 575	10 012	15 587

The religious composition of German immigration to Brazil showed a relative balance between Catholics and Protestants (mostly Lutherans), though the proportion varied according to migratory waves and regions of origin. It is estimated that between 1824 and 1922, Protestants accounted for 55% to 60% of the total, while Catholics made up about 40% to 45% of the immigrants. The Protestant predominance was more pronounced during the pioneer phase (1824–1850), with the arrival of colonists from Hunsrück and the Palatinate, and was further reinforced after 1850 with the massive arrival of Pomeranians in Espírito Santo and Santa Catarina. Conversely, the Catholic contingent grew larger during later waves from the Rhineland and Bavaria, particularly expanding into the western regions of Santa Catarina and Paraná in the 20th century. This confessional duality was a determining factor in the social organization of the colonies, influencing everything from urban architecture—such as the construction of churches and parochial schools—to higher rates of endogamy, which tended to be more elevated in isolated Lutheran settlements due to linguistic and liturgical barriers.

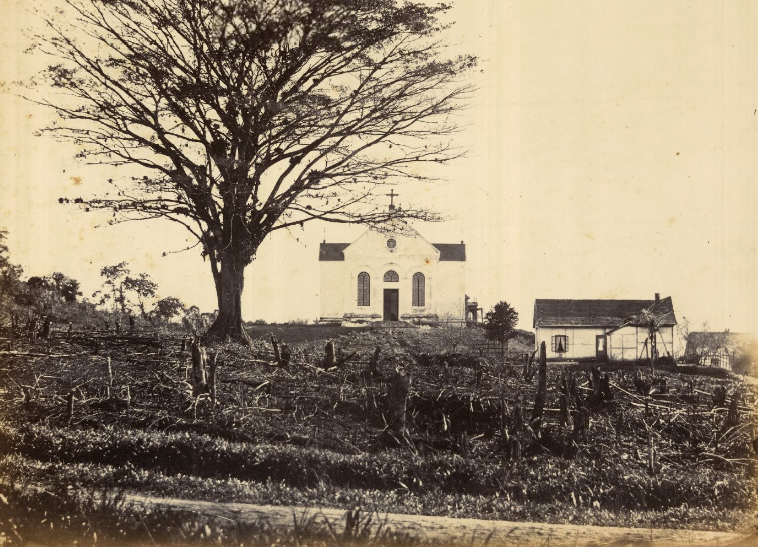
Catholic church (left side) and a half-timbered house (right side) in the Dona Francisca Colony in 1866, currently Joinville.

According to the 1872 census, out of the 40,056 Germans residing in Brazil, 22,305 were non-Catholic (55.7%) and 17,751 were Catholic (44.3%). Germans represented the first major migratory flow composed of Protestants to Brazil after centuries of a Roman Catholic monopoly. However, during the Empire of Brazil, non-Catholics faced restrictions on several of their civil rights. Although the Brazilian Constitution of 1824 established that no one should be persecuted based on religious belief, Catholicism remained the official state religion. According to the Criminal Code of the Empire, those who were not Catholic could only practice their religion inside the home and were prohibited from celebrating "worship in a building configured as a temple"; those who violated this rule were to be "dispersed by the justice of the peace and punished with a fine of 2,000 to 12,000 mil-réis."

Furthermore, during most of the Imperial period, non-Catholics were barred from being elected to the Chamber of Deputies or the Senate. Doctors, lawyers, and engineers were also required to pledge allegiance to the Catholic faith upon graduation. Full political eligibility for non-Catholics was only achieved with the Saraiva Law of 1881. The formal separation of church and state in Brazil was only enacted with the Brazilian Constitution of 1891, following the proclamation of the Republic.

== Marriages and endogamy ==
Endogamy was a central demographic phenomenon in German communities in Brazil until the mid-20th century. Defined as preferential marriage within one's own ethnic and confessional group, it was not merely a manifestation of cultural isolation, but an economic viability strategy for small family farms. The practice served as a regulatory mechanism to prevent the excessive fragmentation of land into minifundia. Since the Brazilian inheritance system mandated equal division among heirs, marriages between the children of neighboring colonists allowed for the merger of adjacent plots. The goal was to maintain productive units of at least 25 hectares, a threshold considered the minimum required for subsistence through polyculture and to prevent family insolvency. Additionally, it ensured that the new family unit shared the same European work ethic and agricultural techniques, which were vital in a system that did not rely on slave labor.

The high levels of endogamy among Germans in Brazil enabled the preservation of various cultural traits, resulting in the formation of "linguistic islands" where German dialects, such as Hunsrückisch and Pomeranian, were preserved for generations.

Statistical studies indicate that religion was the main divider in marriage patterns. While Catholic Germans tended to integrate more rapidly with the Luso-Brazilian population due to religious affinity and coexistence within shared parishes, Lutherans maintained a stricter isolation.

Proportion of Intra-ethnic Marriages (German x German)
Location (Period)	German Catholics	German Lutherans
Curitiba (1850–1919)	42.88%	93.10%
São Lourenço do Sul (1861–1930)	73.90%	96.90%

This disparity occurred because Lutheranism functioned as a Germanizing element: services conducted in German and the absence of Brazilian congregants discouraged external infiltration. In contrast, in the absence of their own specific churches within the colonies, German Catholics attended Brazilian temples, which increased the likelihood of mixed unions.

Beyond faith, other factors reinforced endogamy:

- Geographical isolation: The colonies formed "islands" separated by dense forests, limiting social contact to the immediate surroundings of the local parish.
- Early marriage: Women marrying at 18 or 19 years old limited the timeframe available to seek spouses outside the community circle.
- Ethnic prejudices: Negative social representations from both sides—with Germans criticizing the Brazilian work ethic and Brazilians finding the immigrants' customs and language strange—created psychological barriers to intermarriage.

The transition toward exogamy (mixed marriages) occurred gradually during the 20th century. While mixed marriages accounted for only 5% of the total in 1890, this figure rose to 35% by 1950. This increase reflects the impact of urbanization, compulsory military service, and the nationalization policies of the Vargas Era, which broke the isolation of the rural settlements (known as picadas) and definitively integrated the descendants of immigrants into wider Brazilian society.

=== Regions of origin ===
The geographic origin of German immigrants varied according to migratory cycles. In Rio Grande do Sul, the initial flow between 1824 and 1850 consisted mostly of peasants from the Rhineland-Palatinate (Hunsrück), representing about 60% of the total. From the 1850s onward, there was a shift in the migratory axis toward northeastern Germany, with Pomeranians comprising up to 20% of the total flow to the South and the vast majority of settlers who established themselves in Espírito Santo.

Locality	Foundation	Origin of immigrants
São Leopoldo RS	1824	Hunsrück, Saxony, Württemberg, Saxe-Coburg
Santa Cruz RS	1849	Rhineland, Pomerania, Silesia
Santo Ângelo RS	1857	Rhineland, Saxony, Pomerania
Nova Petrópolis RS	1859	Pomerania, Saxony, Bohemia
Teutônia RS	1868	Westphalia
São Lourenço RS	1857	Pomerania, Rhineland
Blumenau SC	1850	Pomerania, Holstein, Hanover, Brunswick, Saxony
Brusque SC	1860	Baden, Oldenburg, Rhineland, Pomerania, Schleswig-Holstein, Brunswick
Joinville SC	1851	Prussia, Oldenburg, Schleswig-Holstein, Hanover, Switzerland
Curitiba PR	1878	Volga Germans
Santa Isabel ES	1847	Hunsrück, Pomerania, Rhineland, Prussia, Saxony
São Leopoldina ES	1857	Pomerania, Rhineland, Prussia, Saxony

== German influence in Brazil ==
=== Political influence ===
Although Germany's interest in German Brazilian communities intensified in 1896 with Weltpolitik — a foreign policy aimed at preventing the assimilation of emigrants for expansionist purposes – local reality diverged from European nationalist expectations. Descendants of Germans in Brazil did not form a homogeneous bloc; on the contrary, they were marked by religious rivalries between Catholics and Lutherans, regional divisions, and disputes between conservatives and liberals. Thus, despite the geographic isolation of certain colonies and the preservation of the German language, the sense of belonging to a minority group did not translate into anti-Brazilian mobilizations, thereby deconstructing the myth of the "German danger".

During the Old Republic, politicians of German origin with national influence were rare. Figures such as Lauro Müller, who became Minister of Foreign Affairs, suffered persecution due to their origins; Müller was forced to resign during World War I after accusations of partiality made by Rui Barbosa. Other figures, such as Vítor Konder and Lindolfo Collor, lost political space after the 1930 Revolution, while Filinto Müller stood out on the national stage not for representing the community, but for his role as head of the political police under the dictatorship of Getúlio Vargas.

In contemporary history, individuals of German descent reached the highest office of the Brazilian Executive with four presidents. Ernesto Geisel (1974–1979), the son of immigrants and a German speaker in childhood, maintained a nationalist and pragmatic stance toward Germany, exemplified by the signing of the Brazil–Germany nuclear agreement. Later, Fernando Collor (1990–1992), grandson of Lindolfo Collor, and Itamar Franco (1992–1994), who had Hamburg ancestry on his father's side, also held the office. Jair Bolsonaro (2019–2022) became the fourth officeholder of this origin, being the great-grandson of the German immigrant Carl Hintze, who arrived in Brazil around 1883 from Hamburg. This succession of heads of state from different ideological backgrounds consolidates the definitive integration and dilution of German descendants within the political elite and Brazilian national identity.

=== Cultural influence ===
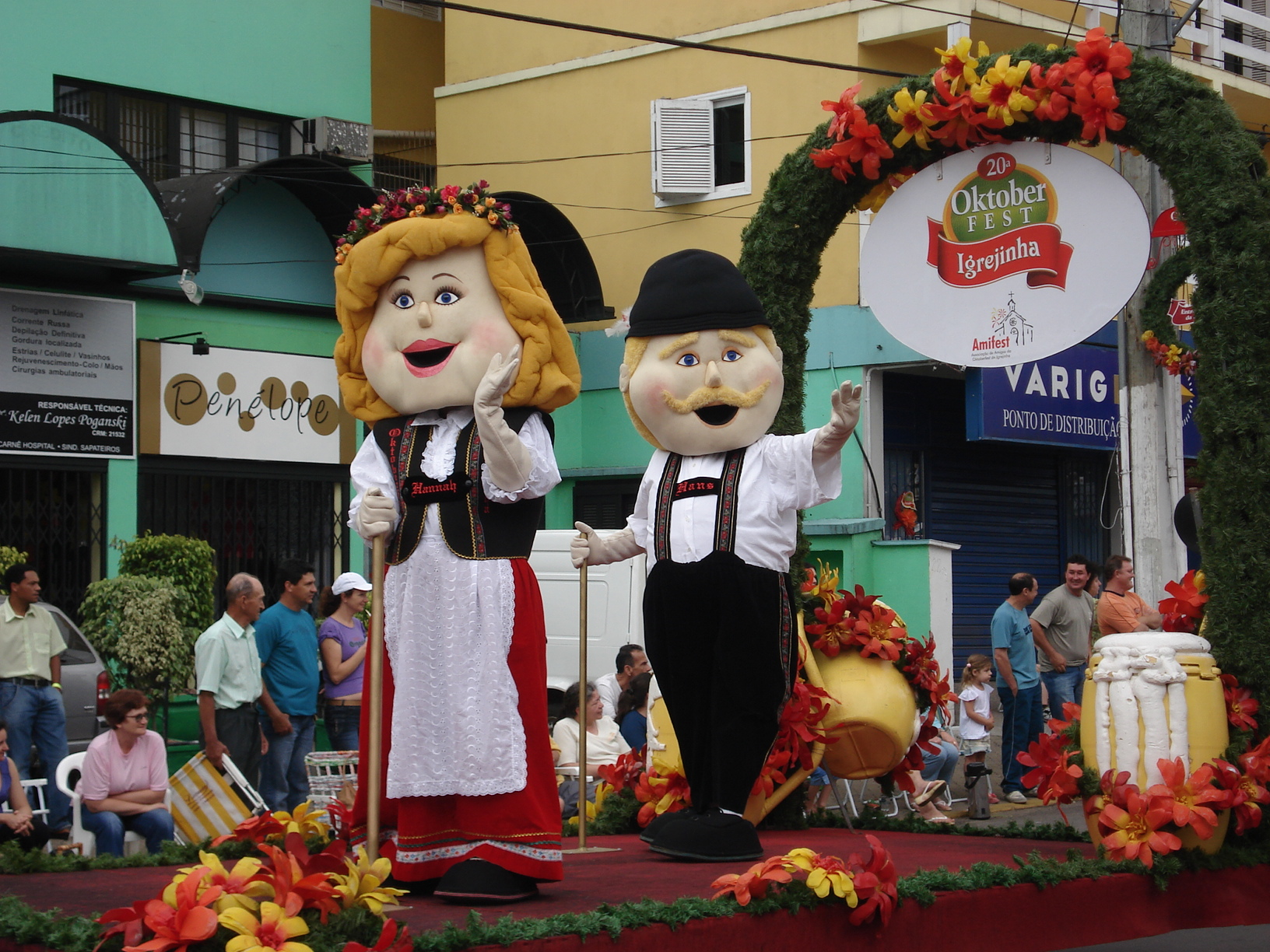
Celebration of the Oktoberfest, in the Gaúcho city of Igrejinha.

The mark of German immigration is deeply embedded in the South Region of Brazil, manifesting itself in architecture, gastronomy, and the maintenance of minority languages that shaped German Brazilian identity. During the 19th and early 20th centuries, rural colonies functioned as spaces of cultural preservation, where the German language predominated and daily life was guided by European habits, sustained by a network of press outlets and community schools of their own. However, this isolation was disrupted by Getúlio Vargas's Nationalization campaign, which forced the transition to Portuguese and marginalized the use of German, associating it with a supposed sense of superiority or lack of patriotism – a perception that still reverberates in contemporary social stigmas.

From the 1980s onward, a movement of "revitalization" of Germanness can be observed, often linked to mass tourism. Festivals such as the Oktoberfest in Blumenau — created after the 1984 floods to rebuild the city's morale – were not brought by the original immigrants but imported from Bavaria as a planned cultural product. This phenomenon generated what sociologists describe as an "invented tradition": cities such as Pomerode, although populated by northerners from Pomerania, adopted Bavarian costumes and architectural styles (from southern Germany) because they are more recognizable to Brazilian tourists. Similarly, the resurgence of half-timbered constructions in cities such as Gramado and Igrejinha serves more as commercial aesthetics than as organic architectural continuity, consolidating the image of German cities as "authentic commodities".

Currently, the recognition of Brazil's cultural diversity has led to the co-officialization of languages such as Riograndenser Hunsrückisch and Pomeranian in various municipalities, seeking to protect the linguistic rights of these communities in light of the historical record of forced silencing.

=== The German language in Brazil ===
==== Schooling ====
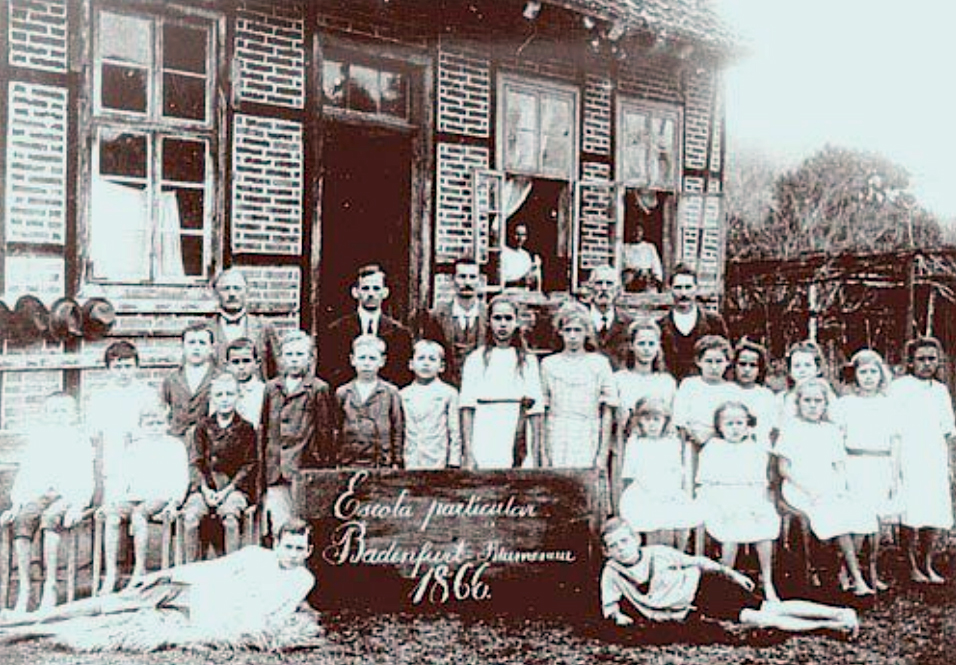
Teachers and students in front of the private German school in Blumenau. German immigrants in Brazil valued the education of their children, at a time when most Brazilians were still illiterate.

Education played a central role in the organization of German Brazilian communities, being regarded as an inseparable pillar of religious practice and cultural preservation (Deutschtum). In the absence of educational policies and infrastructure provided by the imperial government and, later, the republican regime, the settlers themselves structured and financed their own educational system through community school associations (Schulvereine). In these institutions, immigrants paid for the construction of school buildings and teachers’ salaries – often remunerated in kind, with agricultural products – ensuring that instruction was delivered in German and that Lutheran or Catholic precepts from their regions of origin were maintained. This self-managed school model allowed literacy rates in German colonies to be significantly higher than the Brazilian national average in the 19th century, consolidating the school as the core of the colony's social and economic life.

The high regard for education among German immigrants derived from a worldview shaped by Lutheran Protestantism, which required direct literacy for reading the Bible, and from the concept of Bildung (the integral formation of the individual). While in 19th-century Brazil the latifundia-based agrarian structure regarded formal education as a privilege of elites or even a threat to the maintenance of an illiterate labor force, Germanic settlers perceived schooling as a tool for economic advancement and political autonomy. For the German immigrant, the community school was a means of ensuring that their children would not be absorbed by the “barbarism of the forest” or reduced to the condition of rural laborers, but instead would acquire the technical knowledge necessary to manage small properties and artisanal workshops. As a result, literacy rates in German colonies exceeded 80%, in stark contrast to the Brazilian national average, which at the turn of the 20th century still recorded about 65% illiteracy among the adult population.

This phenomenon of “school priority” was a direct response to governmental neglect, compelling settlers to finance their own teachers and educational materials in order to avoid acculturation and functional illiteracy in agricultural frontier regions. The scope of the German community educational system is corroborated by early 20th-century statistical data indicating the existence of approximately 1,579 German schools operating in Brazil around 1930, serving more than 85,000 students.

The high literacy rate in German colonies functioned as an economic and social multiplier. According to Emilio Willems, mastery of reading and writing enabled German immigrants to access technical innovations through European agricultural and veterinary manuals, generating decisive commercial autonomy in relation to urban intermediaries. This context transformed basic education into the principal pillar of human capital that would later sustain the region's industrialization.

Beyond direct property management, literacy enabled the emergence of a thriving German-language press, which disseminated information on market prices, Brazilian legislation, and global technological advances. Newspapers such as Kolonie-Zeitung, in Joinville, and Deutsche Zeitung, in Porto Alegre, functioned as forums for economic debate and technical instruction, connecting isolated settlers to global trends. This educational foundation also facilitated the organization of Schützenvereine (shooting societies) and cooperatives, which required skills in reading statutes and managing accounts. In a Brazil where illiteracy predominated in rural areas, the literate German settler became an agent capable of interpreting contracts and operating complex machinery, supplying the qualified labor and managerial capacity that enabled the transition from artisanal workshops to large textile and metallurgical factories by the late 19th century.

==== The language and ethnic identity ====
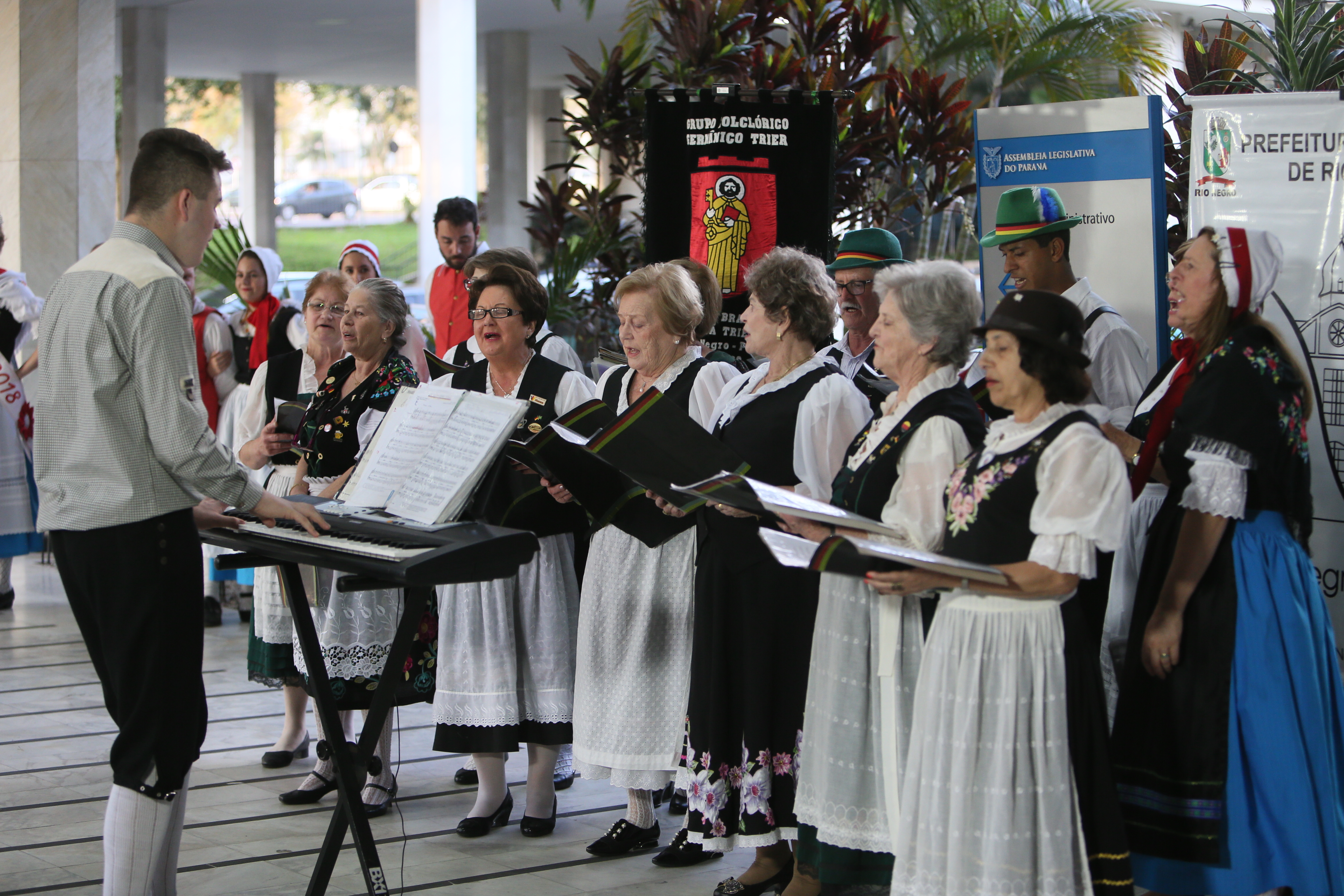
Presentation of the Germânico Trier Folklore Group, from Rio Negro, Paraná.

The Germanic immigrants who arrived in southern Brazil in the 19th century formed a heterogeneous group originating from various parts of Central Europe, such as Prussia, Pomerania, Switzerland and Russia (Volga Germans). Since German unification only occurred in 1871, these settlers brought a multiplicity of regional dialects, as standard German (Hochdeutsch) was, until the 19th century, primarily a literary and liturgical language. In Brazil, the isolation of colonies in inhospitable regions favored the formation of "linguistic islands" in which, by demographic predominance, the Franconian-Rhenish dialect of Hunsrück (Hunsrückisch) gradually prevailed over others, becoming the lingua franca in much of the South, while Pomeranian and Westphalian were preserved in specific settlements in Espírito Santo and Santa Catarina.

Given the absence of state support, immigrants themselves organized their educational system. While illiteracy in Brazil reached 80% of the population in 1872, in German colonies it was virtually nonexistent, the result of a network that by 1930 comprised 1,579 ethnic schools. In these institutions, standard German was taught as a cultivated language, while dialects were maintained for everyday use. This structure sustained a hybrid identity, the "German Brazilian": individuals whose mother tongue was German, yet whose political allegiance was to Brazil.

The decline of this system occurred with the Nationalization campaign (1937), which closed ethnic schools and prohibited the public use of the language. The 1940 Census revealed the magnitude of the challenge faced by the State: 644,458 people spoke German at home, of whom more than 580,000 were native Brazilians — the vast majority belonging to the third generation or beyond. The trauma of Nationalization and the prohibitions during World War II stigmatized speakers, associating dialect use with rural backwardness and accelerating linguistic interference from Portuguese. From the 1970s onward, urbanization restricted language use largely to the domestic sphere; however, recent recognition of these varieties as cultural heritage has led to their co-officialization in several municipalities.

Brazilian-born German speakers in 1940, by State
State	Number	State	Number
Rio Grande do Sul	393,934	Paraná	11,111
Santa Catarina	176,762	Rio de Janeiro	7,249
São Paulo	26,565	Minas Gerais	2,818
Espírito Santo	25,659	Total Brazil	580,114

German speakers at home by generation, in 1940
Generation	Number
First (Immigrants)	64,000
Second (Children)	110,000
Third and subsequent	470,000
Total	644,000

==== Current situation ====
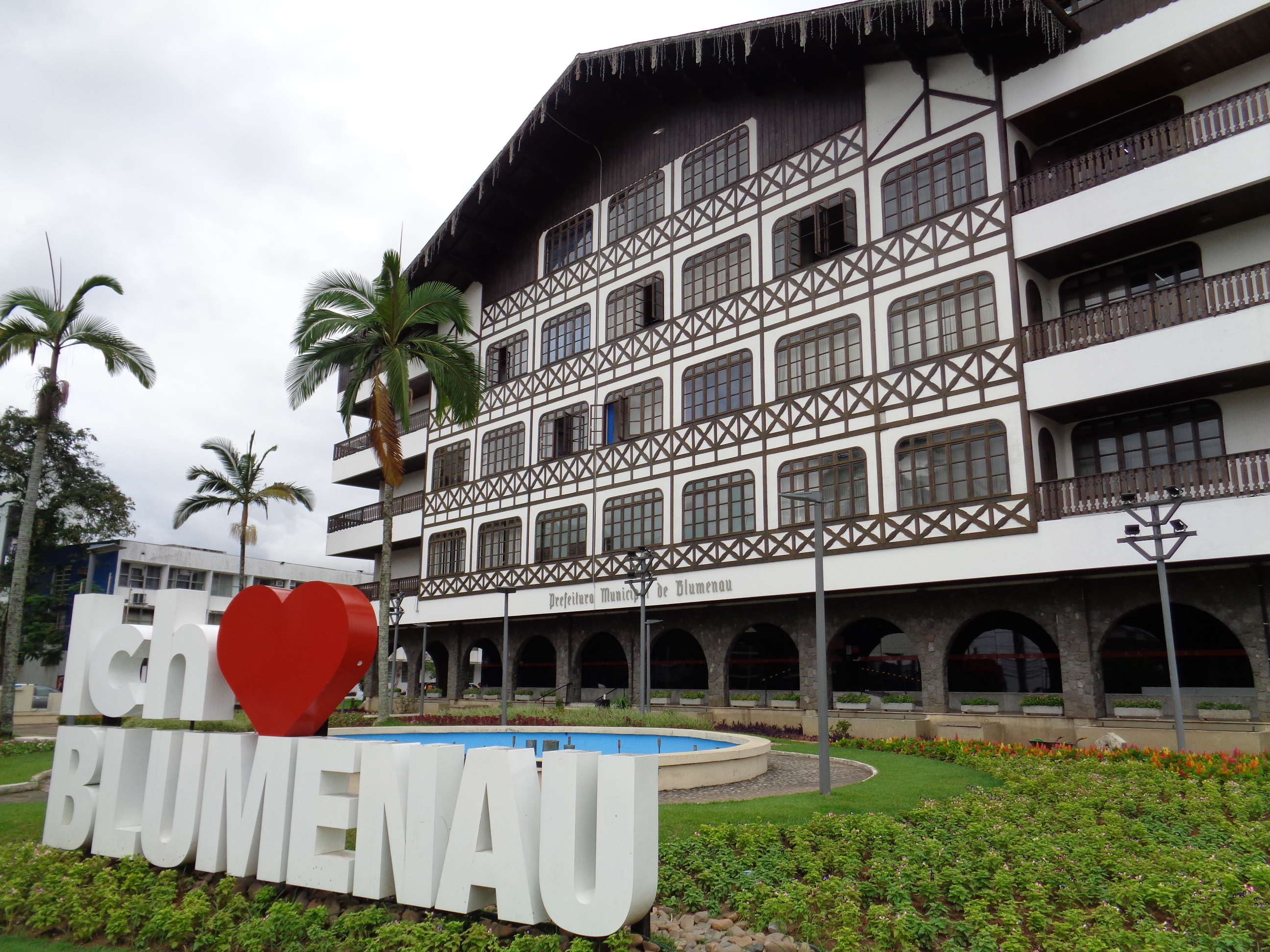
Inscription Ich liebe Blumenau ("I love Blumenau" in German) in front of the Blumenau city hall. The German language is co-official in this municipality.

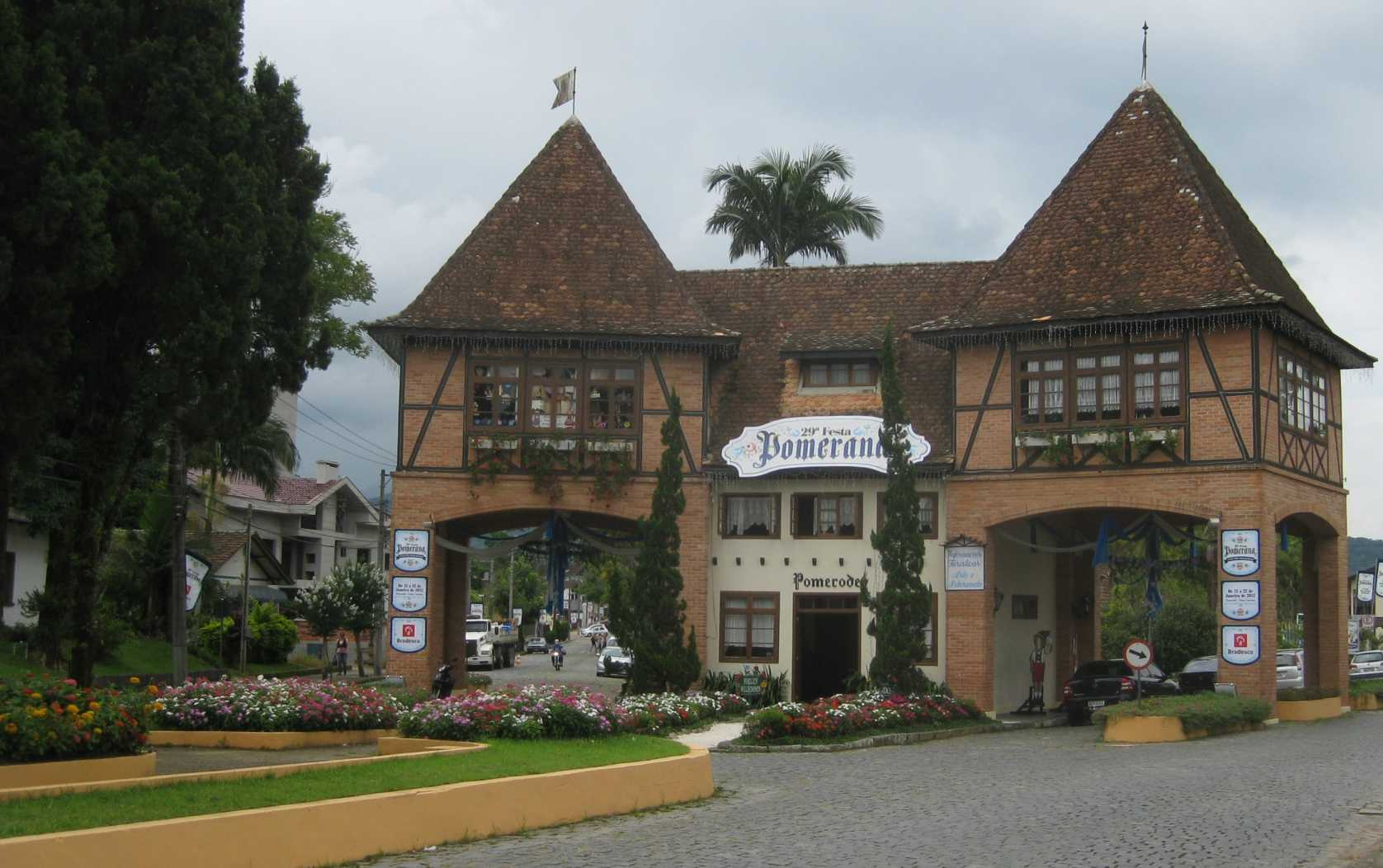
Entrance to Pomerode. In this Santa Catarina city, the majority of the population communicates in German.

Although national censuses have omitted questions about language since 1950, academic estimates and regional surveys attest to the resilience – albeit declining – of Germanic languages in Brazil. In 1970, Rio Grande do Sul had approximately 1.3 million speakers of German varieties; by the 1990s, this number had declined to between 700,000 and 900,000. A survey of military conscripts in Rio Grande do Sul (1985–1987) found that bilingualism reached 26.4% of the group, with German predominating in 56% of these cases. However, a reduction of nearly 12% in language transmission between parents and children was recorded, demonstrating the increasing pressure of Portuguese on younger generations.

Currently, the country exhibits a dynamic balance between Portuguese and German in bilingual communities, challenging the national "monolingualism myth." Brazil is considered one of the most multilingual countries in the world, hosting around 200 languages, of which approximately 30 are of immigrant origin. In areas of German colonization, language preservation historically resulted from rural isolation and the community school system. Today, the typical speaker profile is predominantly rural and elderly; for this group, dialects such as Riograndenser Hunsrückisch symbolize family solidarity and ancestral origins, whereas Portuguese is associated with urbanization, formal education, and social prestige.

In recent years, there has been a movement to value and safeguard this heritage. Several municipalities have initiated processes of language co-officialization, as occurred in Blumenau (2024) and Pomerode, where proficiency in German and Pomeranian continues to hold strong social and political significance, being used even in electoral campaigns to foster trust among local voters. Experts warn, however, that without active linguistic policies these dialectal varieties – which differ from contemporary European German by lacking modern anglicisms and preserving archaic terms – risk disappearing entirely in the coming decades.

=== German as an official language ===
Historically, the Brazilian State promoted the image of a monolingual nation, adopting repressive measures that equated mastery of Portuguese with the very condition of citizenship. More recently, however, this paradigm has been challenged by the recognition of linguistic minorities as elements of cultural heritage. Within this revitalization context, municipalities with strong Germanic colonization have initiated language co-officialization processes. Pomerode (SC) was a pioneer in adopting standard German as a co-official language in 2010, a policy later extended to cities such as Blumenau, which in 2024 consolidated German as a secondary language and maintains a growing network of public bilingual schools.

In Espírito Santo, recognition reached the state level with Constitutional Amendment Proposal (PEC) 11/2009, which included German and Pomeranian as elements of cultural heritage in the State Constitution. Municipalities such as Santa Maria de Jetibá and Pancas officially recognized the local vernacular, Pomeranian, which has had a systematized writing system since 2000. By contrast, Riograndenser Hunsrückisch, although the most widespread dialect in southern Brazil, still faces obstacles to official recognition due to the absence of a universally accepted standardized orthography.

Co-officialization seeks not only linguistic preservation but also the restoration of speakers’ dignity, combating the historical stigma associated with rural dialects. Specialists emphasize the urgency of such measures: in many communities, fluency is concentrated among individuals over fifty years of age, and the inclusion of German in compulsory education and public services is viewed as the principal mechanism for preventing the extinction of these varieties and ensuring the linguistic rights of future generations.

== See also ==
- Brazil–Germany relations
- Brazilians in Germany
- Cândido Godói
- Demography of Brazil
- German Americans
- German Argentines
- German Canadians
- German colonial projects before 1871
- German inventors and discoverers
- Ratlines (World War II aftermath)
