= Convent of São Pedro de Alcântara =

Franciscan monastery in Lisbon

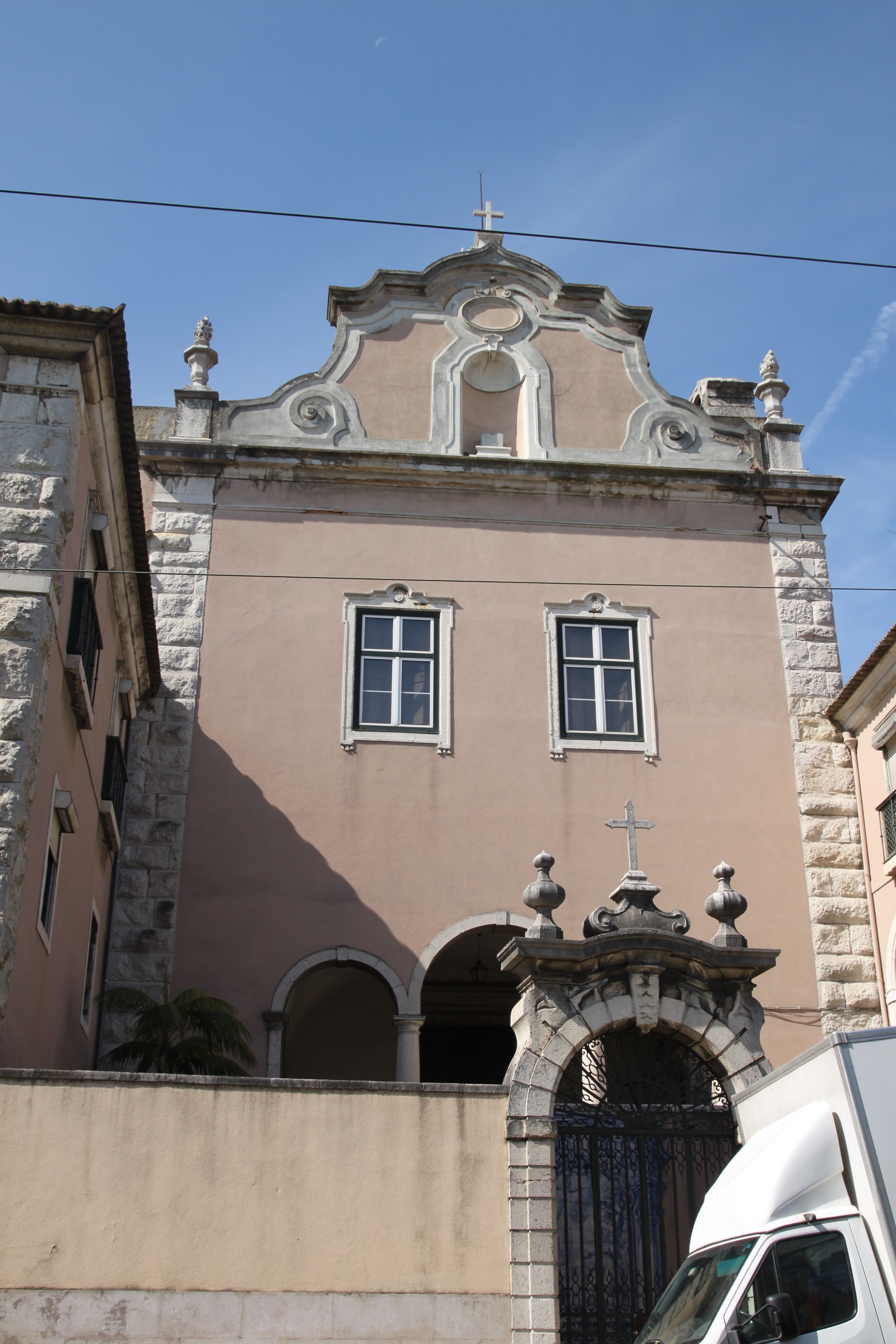
Façade of the Convent of São Pedro de Alcântara

São Pedro de Alcântara was a Franciscan monastery in the Bairro Alto district of Lisbon, founded in the late 17th century. It is a large Baroque building, with a highly decorated chapel.

The monastery was established by António Luís de Meneses, who promised to build the monastery if he prevailed in the Battle of Montes Claros. When the religious orders, convents, and monasteries in Portugal were closed by the government in 1833, the monastery buildings were handed over to the Santa Casa da Misericórdia de Lisboa (a society charged with helping the old, the sick, and abandoned or orphaned children).

At present the Santa Casa uses the buildings as a home for young girls.
