= Anschauung =

Concept

Anschauung is a German concept that is usually translated as "intuition". It, however, connotes a more nuanced definition especially when the concept is applied to philosophical discourse, including quantum theory. Some of the translations include actual, sense impressions, contemplation, view, opinion, and notion. Anschauung is also an important component of Johann Gottlieb Fichte's doctrine of knowledge.

== Concept ==
=== Origin ===
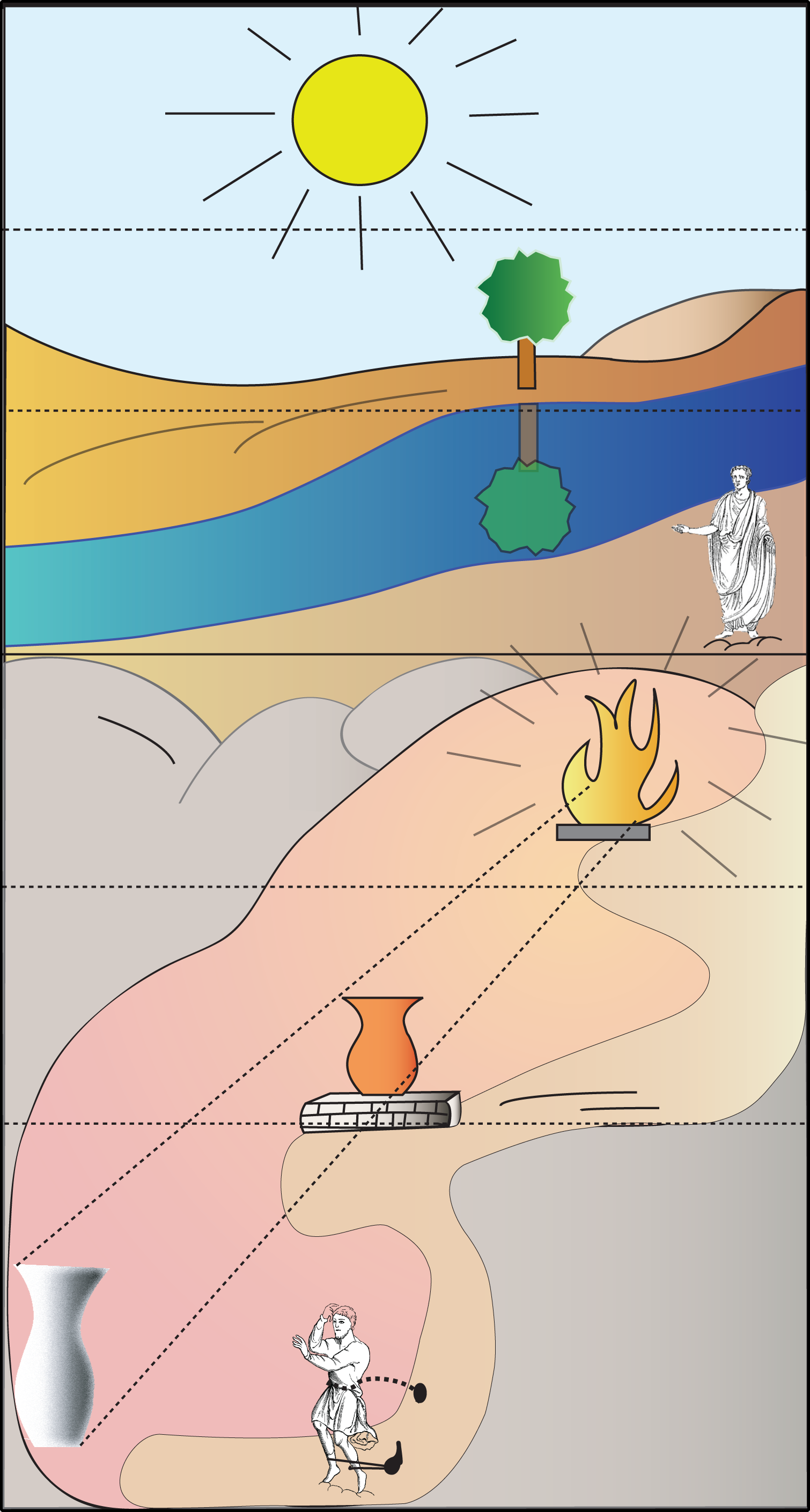
Plato's Allegory of the Cave including the analogy of the Sun

Anschauen or Anschauung, as a philosophical concept (intuition), has been identified in Plato's Allegory of the Cave where it was associated with the terms light, sun, and eye. It was also mentioned in the works of Johann Wolfgang von Goethe and was referred to as "Phantasie", “Einbildungskraft”, “exakte sinnliche Phantasie” and “anschauende Urteilskraft”. Used in different contexts, the concept was employed as a tool in Goethe's creative, scientific, and philosophical works.

The term Anschauung is derived from the Middle High German term aneschouwunge, which means "contemplation" or "to look at". The term emerged into a philosophical concept as it became a component in theoretical discourse. It became a part of Friedrich Nietzsche's theory of language. It is also cited in Georg Wilhelm Friedrich Hegel and Immanuel Kant's works. There are scholars who maintain that the concept is part of the Kantian terminology, which was developed in Latin and translated to German. This observation holds that Kant often associated the word intuitus with Anschauung to make his meaning clear. The conceptualization was also used in the Kantian investigation on the immediate cognition of the existence of God.

=== Definition ===
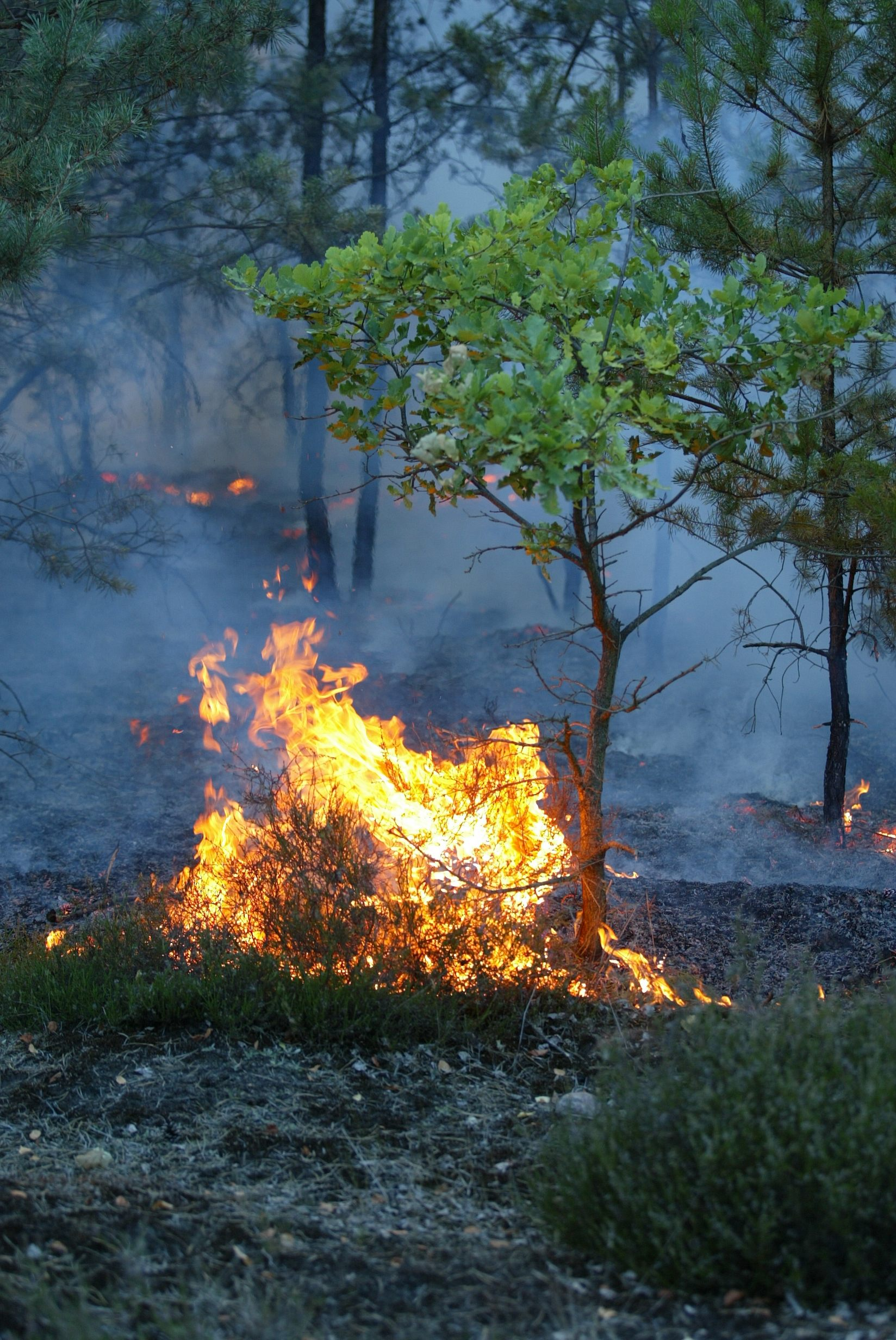
An application of Anschauung as experience is the perception of fire and immediately recognizing it as fire.

According to Hegel, Anschauung is the immediate perception of something, mental or physical, one that is organized according to its inner nature or according to universal reason. In this definition, he distinguished Anschauung from Vorstellung, which pertains to the philosophical concepts (metaphorical or analogical senses) and their dependence on sensory contents.

Arthur Schopenhauer's definition described the term as what transpires once the eye senses an external object, recognizing it as the cause of the vision. Nietzsche defined Anschauung as the projected image of a completely enraptured being. He also associated it with the word "contemplation". In this definition, there is a rejection of Schopenhauer's version of the concept, as it denies the abstract idealism of the will as well as "its objectifications of the world of representations".

=== Interpretations ===
In the Kantian phenomenology, Anschauung is identified as "apprehension". Together with Empfindung (sensation), Anschauung constitutes sense (Sinnlichkeit), which represents subjective states. These two concepts, either independently or together in Wahrnehmung, represent the knowledge of external objects. For Kant, Anschauung is the same as sense-data of knowledge. Another analysis cited it as one of the two characteristics that Kant said represented sensibility. These constitute the sense-impressions identified as facts and are inherent in nature, existing prior to ideas, which are constructs of such impressions. As a doctrine, Anschauung and the corresponding critique of pure understanding are said to reveal the limits of sensible cognition.

In Fichte's doctrine of knowledge, Anschauung plays a role in the perception of the external objects and is united with the notion of Denken. He used Anschauung in various ways when he outlined his doctrine of knowledge. In some instances, he described it as "non-thought" as sense qualifies as such. In other works, however, he cited that all thoughts are confined within Anschauung. Particularly, Fichte identified "ordinary" and technical conceptualizations. The former pertains to perception or the objective universe for man, citing that what is visually perceived is ego-stuff in thought-forms. The latter denotes the "this and that of the qualitative".

According to Arthur Schopenhauer, everyday empirical Anschauung is intellectual in character since it mainly entails the work of the intellect. This definition is notable because it was against the Kantian notion of a totally direct perception (Wahrnehmung). However, some scholars maintain that for both philosophers, Anschauung is some form of perception. For Schopenhauer, Anschauung is not the common conception of idea since it should be understood as intuition and requires a higher degree of intellect. It is also associated with the thinker's notion pessimism, which was used as part of the principle of sufficient reason. He maintained that truth is compatible with Anschauung and that it can achieve the same result as from that of pessimism.
