= Immanuel Kant =

German philosopher (1724–1804)

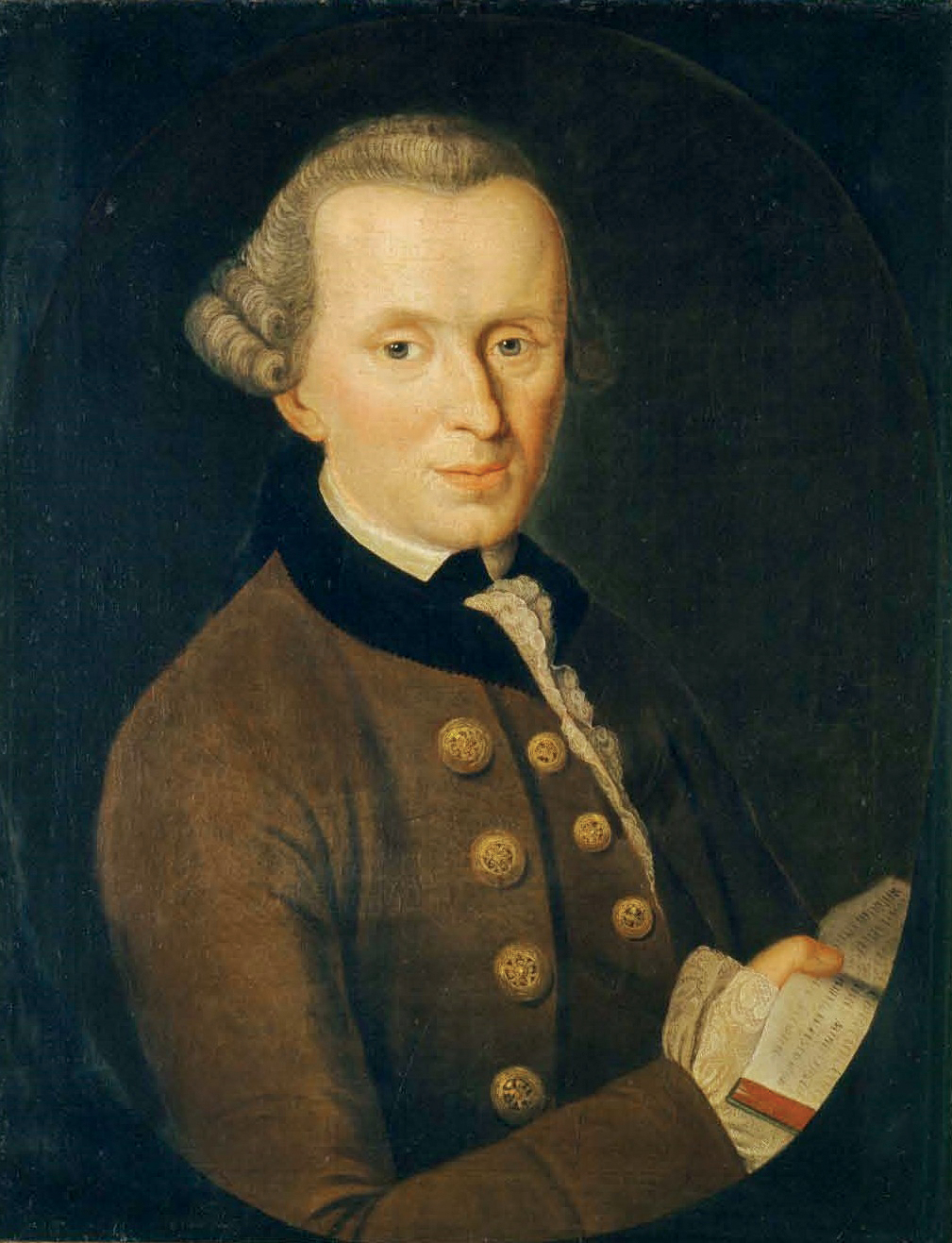
- Portrait by Johann Gottlieb Becker, 1768
- Born: Emanuel Kant; 22 April 1724; Königsberg, Prussia
- Died: 12 February 1804 (aged 79); Königsberg, Prussia

Education
- Education: Collegium Fridericianum; University of Königsberg (M.A./PhD, 1755; Dr. phil. hab., 1756; PhD, 1770)
- Theses: New Elucidation of the First Principles of Metaphysical Cognition (September 1755); On the Form and Principles of the Sensible and Intelligible Worlds (August 1770)
- Academic advisors: Martin Knutzen; J. G. Teske

Philosophical work
- Era: Age of Enlightenment
- Region: Western philosophy
- School: Enlightenment philosophy; Kantianism; Other schools: Classical liberalism; Empirical realism; German idealism; Liberal naturalism; Transcendental idealism
- Institutions: University of Königsberg
- Notable students: See list: J. S. Beck; G. C. W. Busolt; J. G. Herder; Markus Herz; T. G. Hippel; C. J. Kraus; J. M. R. Lenz; K. L. Reinhold (epistolary correspondent); A. F. J. Thibaut
- Main interests: Aesthetics, epistemology, ethics, metaphysics, systematic philosophy
- Notable ideas: See list: Aesthetic judgment and teleological judgment as forms of reflective judgment; Analytic–synthetic distinction; Categorical and hypothetical imperative; Categories; Critical philosophy; Copernican Revolution in philosophy; Disinterested delight; Empirical realism; Kant's antinomies; Kantian ethics; Kingdom of Ends; Nebular hypothesis; Transcendental schema; Theoretical vs. practical philosophy; Transcendental idealism; Transcendental subject; Understanding–reason distinction

Immanuel Kant (Note: UK: /kænt/, US: /kɑːnt/; German: [ɪˈmaːnu̯eːl kant]) (born Emanuel Kant; 22 April 1724 – 12 February 1804) was a German philosopher. Born in Königsberg in the Kingdom of Prussia, he is considered one of the central thinkers of the Enlightenment. His comprehensive and systematic works in epistemology, metaphysics, logic, ethics, aesthetics, political theory, and philosophy of religion have made him one of the most influential and highly discussed figures in modern Western philosophy.

Kant's philosophy is centered on the human subject and motivated by the desire to secure the possibility of both knowledge and morality against the threats of scepticism and determinism. In the Critique of Pure Reason (1781/1787), Kant argues for transcendental idealism, the doctrine that space and time are mere "forms of intuition" (German: Anschauung) that structure all experience and that we have knowledge only of "appearances" and not of the nature of things in themselves. Kant drew a parallel to the Copernican Revolution in his proposal to think of the objects of experience as conforming to people's spatial and temporal forms of intuition and the categories of the understanding, instead of the traditional method of showing how the mind might conform to its objects.

Kant believed that reason is the source of morality and that the categorical imperative binds all rational agents. He believed that aesthetics arises from a faculty of disinterested judgment. Kant hoped that perpetual peace could be secured through an international federation of republican states and international cooperation. Kant believed that true religion is grounded on morality. The exact nature of his religious views is a matter of dispute.

== Early life ==
Immanuel Kant was born on 22 April 1724 into a Prussian German family of Lutheran faith in Königsberg in East Prussia (now Kaliningrad Oblast, Russia). His mother, Anna Regina Reuter, was born in Königsberg to a father from Nuremberg. Her surname is sometimes erroneously given as Porter. Kant's father, Johann Georg Kant, was a German harness-maker from Memel, at the time Prussia's most northeastern city (now Klaipėda, Lithuania). Kant believed his family to be of Scottish descent and that his paternal grandfather's name was originally "Cant", although this has not been verified by genealogical research.

Kant was baptized as Emanuel, changing the spelling of his name to Immanuel after learning Hebrew. He was the fourth of nine children (six of whom reached adulthood). The Kant household stressed the Pietist values of religious devotion, humility, and a literal interpretation of the Bible. Immanuel Kant's early education was strict, punitive, and highly disciplinary, with an emphasis on Latin and religious instruction rather than mathematics and science.

In his later years, Kant lived a strictly ordered life. It was said that neighbors would set their watches by his daily walks. Kant considered marriage twice, first to a widow and then to a Westphalian woman, but on both occasions waited too long. Although he never married, he nevertheless had a rewarding social life; he was a popular teacher and a modestly successful author, even before commencing his major philosophical works.

=== Young scholar ===
Kant demonstrated an early aptitude for study. He first attended the Collegium Fridericianum (then directed by Franz Albert Schultz), from which he graduated at the end of the summer of 1740. In 1740, aged 16, he enrolled at the University of Königsberg, where he would later remain for the rest of his professional life. He studied the philosophy of Gottfried Leibniz and Christian Wolff under Martin Knutzen (Associate Professor of Logic and Metaphysics from 1734 until he died in 1751), a rationalist who was also familiar with developments in British philosophy and science and introduced Kant to the new mathematical physics of Isaac Newton. Knutzen dissuaded Kant from the theory of pre-established harmony, which he regarded as "the pillow for the lazy mind". He also dissuaded Kant from idealism, the idea that reality is purely mental, which most philosophers in the 18th century regarded negatively. The theory of transcendental idealism that Kant later included in the Critique of Pure Reason was developed partially in opposition to traditional idealism. Kant had contacts with students, colleagues, friends and diners who frequented the local Masonic lodge. His main publisher, Johann Friedrich Hartknoch, was also a Freemason.

His father's stroke and subsequent death in 1746 interrupted his studies. Kant left Königsberg shortly after August 1748; he would return there in August 1754. He became a private tutor in the towns surrounding Königsberg, but continued his scholarly research. In 1749, he published his first philosophical work, Thoughts on the True Estimation of Living Forces (written in 1745–1747).

During the Russian occupation of Königsberg during the Seven Years' War (1758–1762), Kant's financial circumstances improved, as he obtained a number of well-paid tutoring assignments from Russian military officers and civil administrators stationed in the city. In December 1758, after the death of Johann David Kypke, Kant petitioned Empress Elizabeth for appointment to the vacant chair of logic and metaphysics at the University of Königsberg, but the position was awarded to another candidate.

== Early work ==
Kant is best known for his work in the philosophy of ethics and metaphysics, but he also contributed significantly to other disciplines. In 1754, while contemplating a prize question by the Berlin Academy about the problem of Earth's rotation, he argued that the Moon's gravity would slow down the Earth's spin. He also put forth the argument that gravity would eventually cause the Moon's tidal locking to coincide with the Earth's rotation. (Note: Kant himself seems to have found his contribution not significant enough that he published his arguments in a newspaper commentary on the prize question and did not submit them to the Academy: "Whether the Earth has Undergone an Alteration of its Axial Rotation". Kant's Cosmogony. Translated by Hastie, William. Glasgow: James Maclehose. 1900 [1754]. pp. 1–11.. The prize was instead awarded in 1756 to P. Frisi, who incorrectly argued against the slowing down of the spin.) The next year, he expanded this reasoning to the formation and evolution of the Solar System in his Universal Natural History and Theory of the Heavens. In 1755, Kant received a license to lecture at the University of Königsberg and began lecturing on a variety of topics including mathematics, physics, logic, and metaphysics. In his 1756 essay on the theory of winds ("New Remarks toward an Elucidation of the Theory of Winds"), Kant laid out a qualitative insight into what is now called Coriolis force.

In 1756, Kant also published three papers on the 1755 Lisbon earthquake. Kant's theory, which involved shifts in huge caverns filled with hot gases, though inaccurate, was one of the first systematic attempts to explain earthquakes in natural rather than supernatural terms. In 1757, Kant began lecturing on geography, making him one of the first lecturers to explicitly teach geography as its own subject. Geography was one of Kant's most popular lecturing topics and, in 1802, a compilation by Friedrich Theodor Rink of Kant's lecturing notes, Physical Geography, was released. After Kant became a professor in 1770, he expanded the topics of his lectures to include lectures on natural law, ethics, and anthropology, along with other topics.

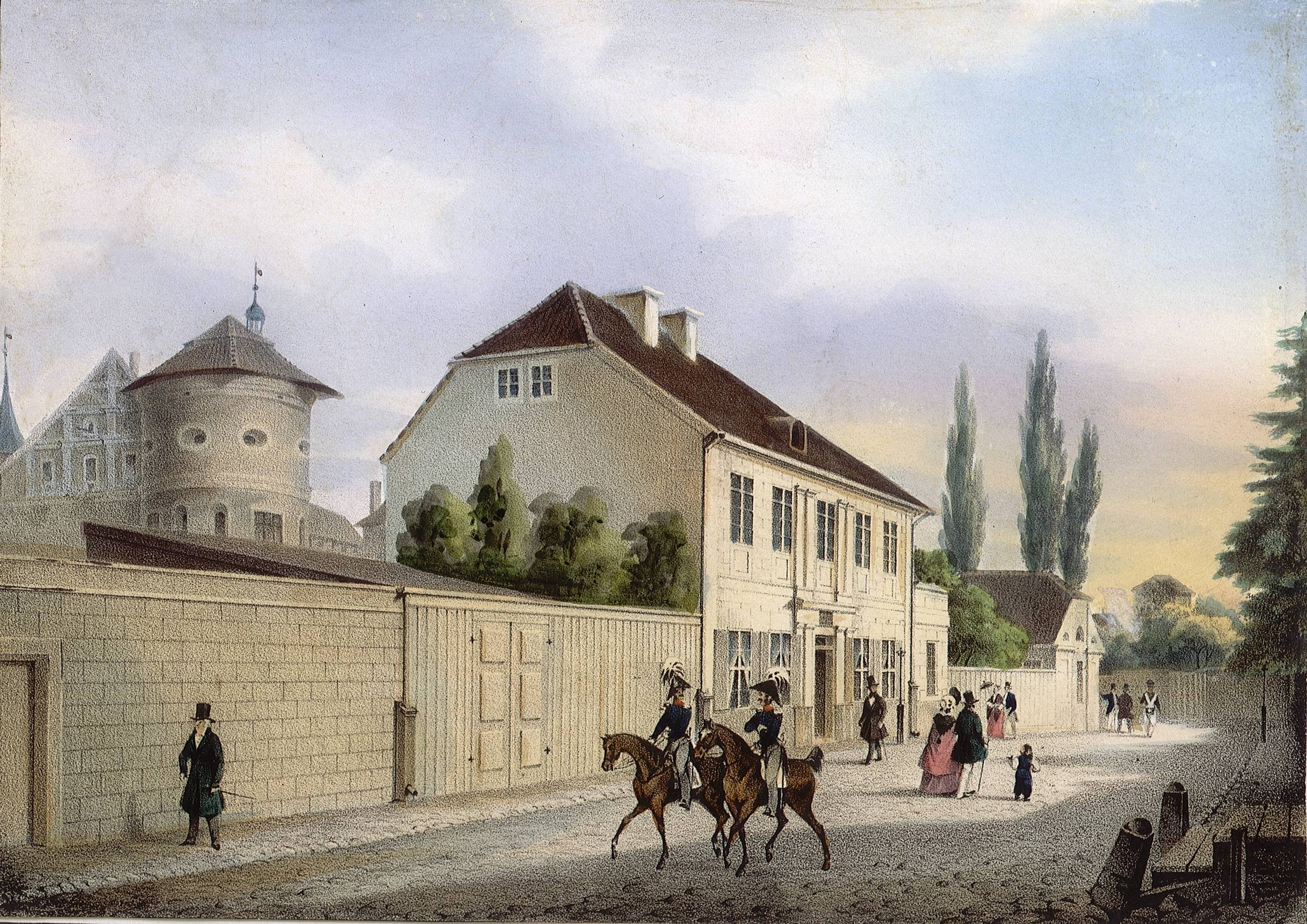
Kant's house in Königsberg in an 1842 painting

In the Universal Natural History, Kant laid out the nebular hypothesis, in which he deduced that the Solar System had formed from a large cloud of gas, a nebula. Kant also correctly deduced that the Milky Way was a large disk of stars, which he theorized had formed from a much larger spinning gas cloud. He further suggested that other distant "nebulae" might be other galaxies. These postulations opened new horizons for astronomy, for the first time extending it beyond the solar system to galactic and intergalactic realms.

From then on, Kant devoted his efforts increasingly towards philosophical issues, even though he continued to write on the sciences throughout his life. In the early 1760s, he produced a series of important works in philosophy. The False Subtlety of the Four Syllogistic Figures, a work in logic, was published in 1762. Two more works appeared the following year: Attempt to Introduce the Concept of Negative Magnitudes into Philosophy and The Only Possible Argument in Support of a Demonstration of the Existence of God. By 1764, Kant had become a notable popular author, and wrote Observations on the Feeling of the Beautiful and Sublime; he was second to Moses Mendelssohn in a Berlin Academy prize competition with his Inquiry Concerning the Distinctness of the Principles of Natural Theology and Morality (often referred to as "The Prize Essay"). In 1766 Kant wrote a critical piece on Emanuel Swedenborg's Dreams of a Spirit-Seer.

In 1770, Kant was appointed Full Professor of Logic and Metaphysics at the University of Königsberg. In defense of this appointment, Kant wrote his inaugural dissertation On the Form and Principles of the Sensible and the Intelligible World. (Note: Since he had written his last habilitation thesis 14 years earlier, a new habilitation thesis was required (see S. J. McGrath, Joseph Carew (eds.), Rethinking German Idealism, Palgrave Macmillan, 2016, p. 24).) This work saw the emergence of several central themes of his mature work, including the distinction between the faculties of intellectual thought and sensible receptivity. To miss this distinction would mean to commit the error of subreption, and, as he says in the last chapter of the dissertation, only in avoiding this error does metaphysics flourish.

While it is true that Kant wrote his greatest works relatively late in life, there is a tendency to underestimate the value of his earlier works. Recent Kant scholarship has devoted more attention to these "pre-critical" writings and has recognized a degree of continuity with his mature work.

=== Publication of the Critique of Pure Reason ===
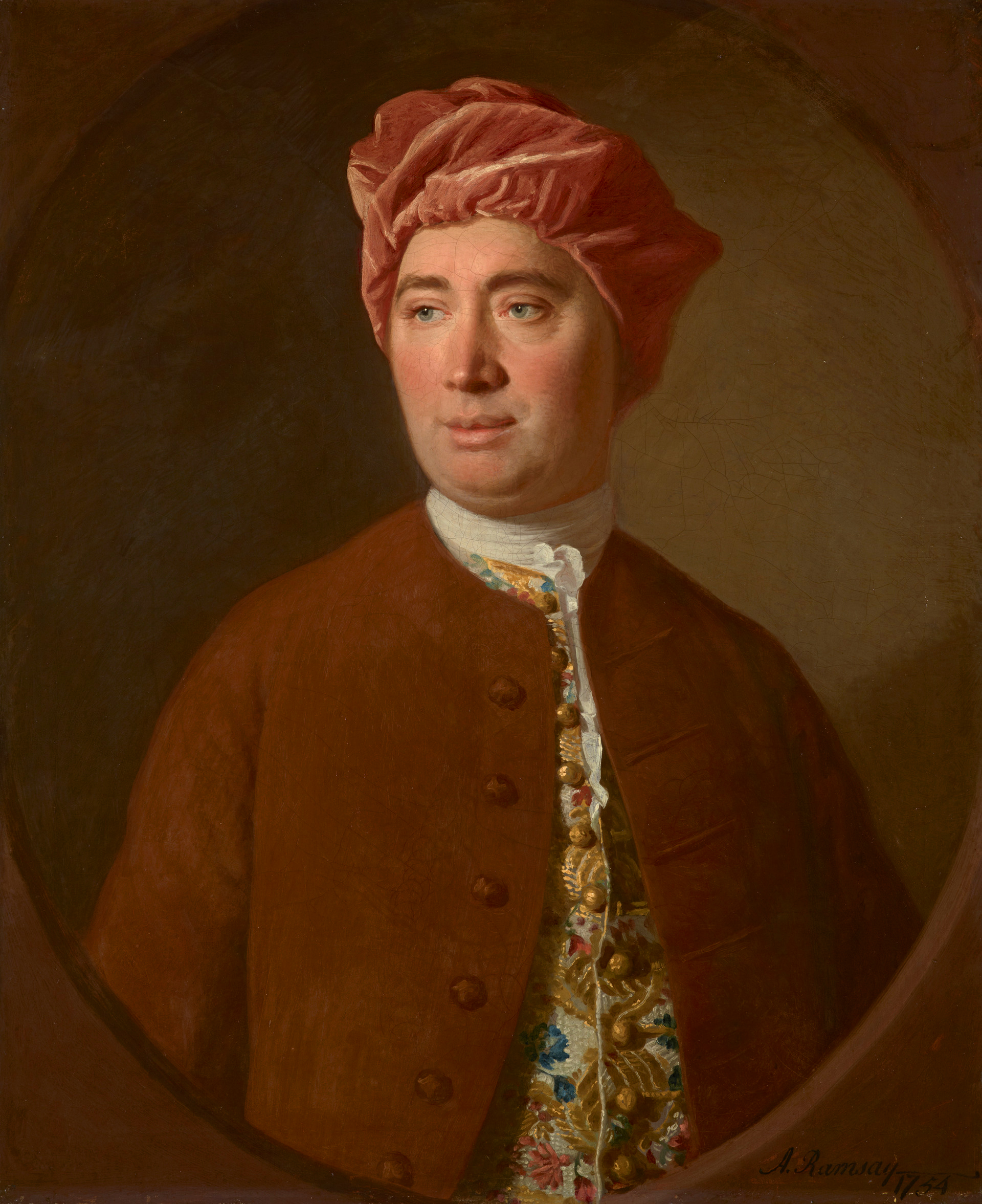
The philosopher David Hume by Allan Ramsay

At age 46, Kant was an established scholar and an increasingly influential philosopher, and much was expected of him. In correspondence with his ex-student and friend Markus Herz, Kant admitted that, in the inaugural dissertation, he had failed to account for the relation between our sensible and intellectual faculties. He needed to explain how we combine what is known as sensory knowledge with the other type of knowledge—that is, reasoned knowledge—these two being related but having very different processes. Kant also credited David Hume with awakening him from a "dogmatic slumber" in which he had unquestioningly accepted the tenets of both religion and natural philosophy. Hume, in his 1739 Treatise on Human Nature, had argued that people know the mind only through a subjective, essentially illusory series of perceptions. Ideas such as causality, morality, and objects are not evident in experience, so their reality may be questioned. Kant felt that reason could remove this skepticism, and he set himself to solving these problems. Although fond of company and conversation with others, Kant isolated himself, and resisted friends' attempts to bring him out of his isolation. (Note: In 1778, in response to one of these offers by a former pupil, Kant wrote: "Any change makes me apprehensive, even if it offers the greatest promise of improving my condition, and I am persuaded by this natural instinct of mine that I must take heed if I wish that the threads which the Fates spin so thin and weak in my case to be spun to any length. My great thanks, to my well-wishers and friends, who think so kindly of me as to undertake my welfare, but at the same time a most humble request to protect me in my current condition from any disturbance.") When Kant emerged from his silence in 1781, the result was the Critique of Pure Reason, printed by Johann Friedrich Hartknoch. Kant countered Hume's empiricism by claiming that some knowledge exists inherently in the mind, independent of experience. He drew a parallel to the Copernican Revolution in his proposal that worldly objects can be intuited a priori, and that intuition is consequently distinct from objective reality. Perhaps the most direct contested matter was Hume's argument against any necessary connection between causal events, which Hume characterized as the "cement of the universe". In the Critique of Pure Reason, Kant argues for what he takes to be the a priori justification of such necessary connection.

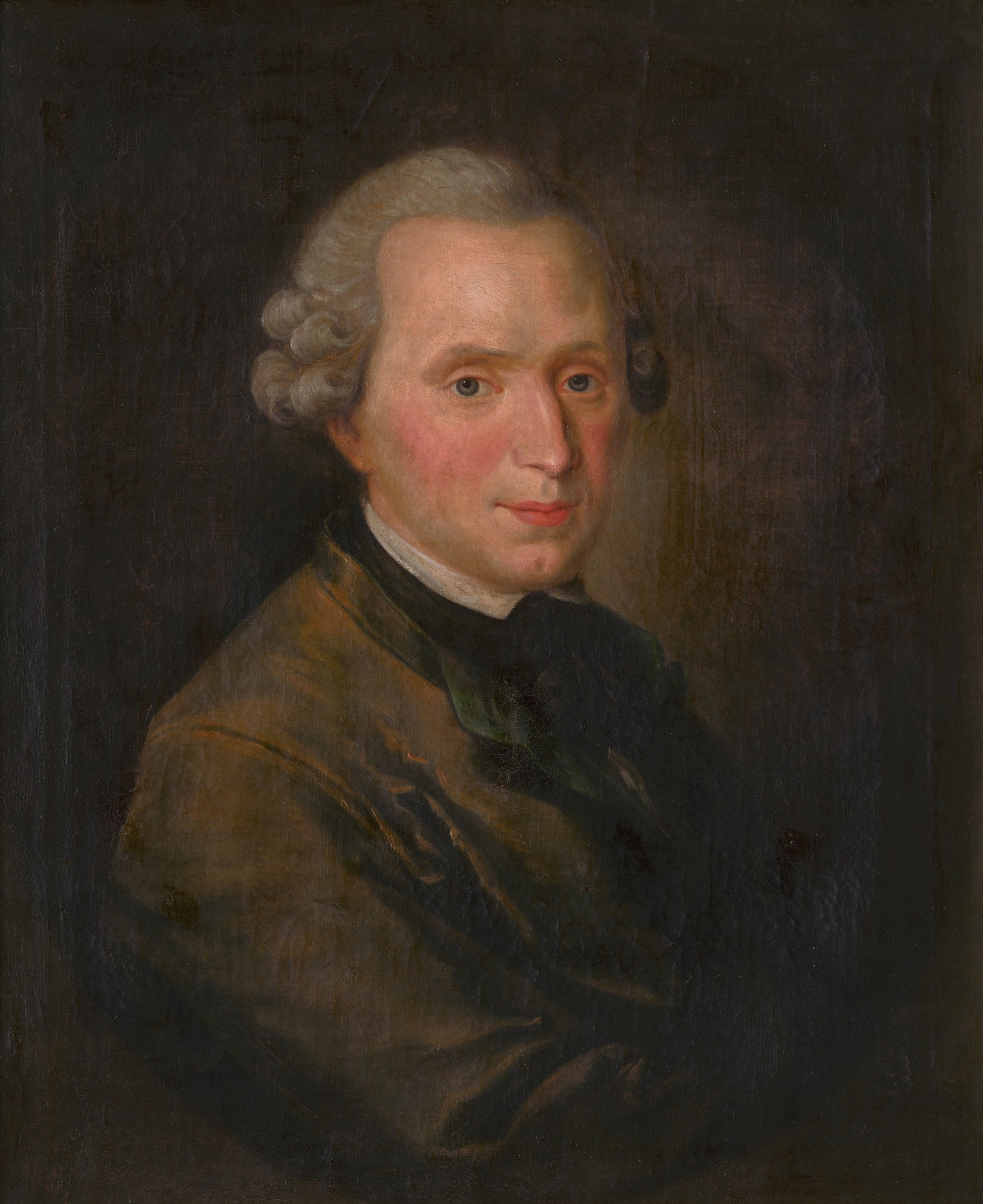
Portrait of Kant by Johann Christoph Frisch, after Johann Gottlieb Becker, c. 1770

Although now recognized as one of the greatest works in the history of philosophy, the Critique disappointed Kant's readers upon its initial publication. The book was long, over 800 pages in the original German edition, and written in a convoluted style. Kant was quite upset with its reception. His former student Johann Gottfried Herder criticized it for placing reason as an entity worthy of criticism by itself instead of considering the process of reasoning within the context of language and one's entire personality. Similarly to Christian Garve and Johann Georg Heinrich Feder, he rejected Kant's position that space and time possess a form that can be analyzed. Garve and Feder also faulted the Critique for not explaining differences in perception of sensations. Its density made it, as Herder said in a letter to Johann Georg Hamann, a "tough nut to crack", obscured by "all this heavy gossamer". Its reception stood in stark contrast to the praise Kant had received for earlier works, such as his Prize Essay and shorter works that preceded the first Critique. Recognizing the need to clarify the original treatise, Kant wrote the Prolegomena to any Future Metaphysics in 1783 as a summary of its main views. Shortly thereafter, Kant's friend Johann Friedrich Schultz (1739–1805), a professor of mathematics, published Explanations of Professor Kant's Critique of Pure Reason (Königsberg, 1784), which was a brief but very accurate commentary on Kant's Critique of Pure Reason.

Kant's reputation gradually rose through the latter portion of the 1780s, sparked by a series of important works: the 1784 essay, "Answer to the Question: What is Enlightenment?"; 1785's Groundwork of the Metaphysics of Morals (his first work on moral philosophy); and Metaphysical Foundations of Natural Science from 1786. Kant's fame ultimately arrived from an unexpected source. In 1786, Karl Leonhard Reinhold published a series of public letters on Kantian philosophy. In these letters, Reinhold framed Kant's philosophy as a response to the central intellectual controversy of the era: the pantheism controversy. Friedrich Jacobi had accused the recently deceased Gotthold Ephraim Lessing (a distinguished dramatist and philosophical essayist) of Spinozism. Such a charge, tantamount to an accusation of atheism, was vigorously denied by Lessing's friend Moses Mendelssohn, leading to a bitter public dispute among partisans. The controversy gradually escalated into a debate about the values of the Enlightenment and the value of reason. Reinhold maintained in his letters that Kant's Critique of Pure Reason could settle this dispute by defending the authority and bounds of reason. Reinhold's letters were widely read and made Kant the most famous philosopher of his era.

== Later work ==
Kant published a second edition of the Critique of Pure Reason in 1787, heavily revising the first parts of the book. Most of his subsequent work focused on other areas of philosophy. He continued to develop his moral philosophy, notably in 1788's Critique of Practical Reason (known as the second Critique), and 1797's Metaphysics of Morals. The 1790 Critique of the Power of Judgment (the third Critique) applied the Kantian system to aesthetics and teleology. In 1792, Kant's attempt to publish the Second of the four Pieces of Religion within the Bounds of Bare Reason, in the journal Berlinische Monatsschrift, met with opposition from the King's censorship commission, which had been established that same year in the context of the French Revolution. Kant then arranged to have all four pieces published as a book, routing it through the philosophy department at the University of Jena to avoid the need for theological censorship. This insubordination earned him a now-famous reprimand from the King. When he nevertheless published a second edition in 1794, the censor was so irate that he arranged for a royal order that required Kant never to publish or even speak publicly about religion. Kant then published his response to the King's reprimand and explained himself in the preface of The Conflict of the Faculties (1798).

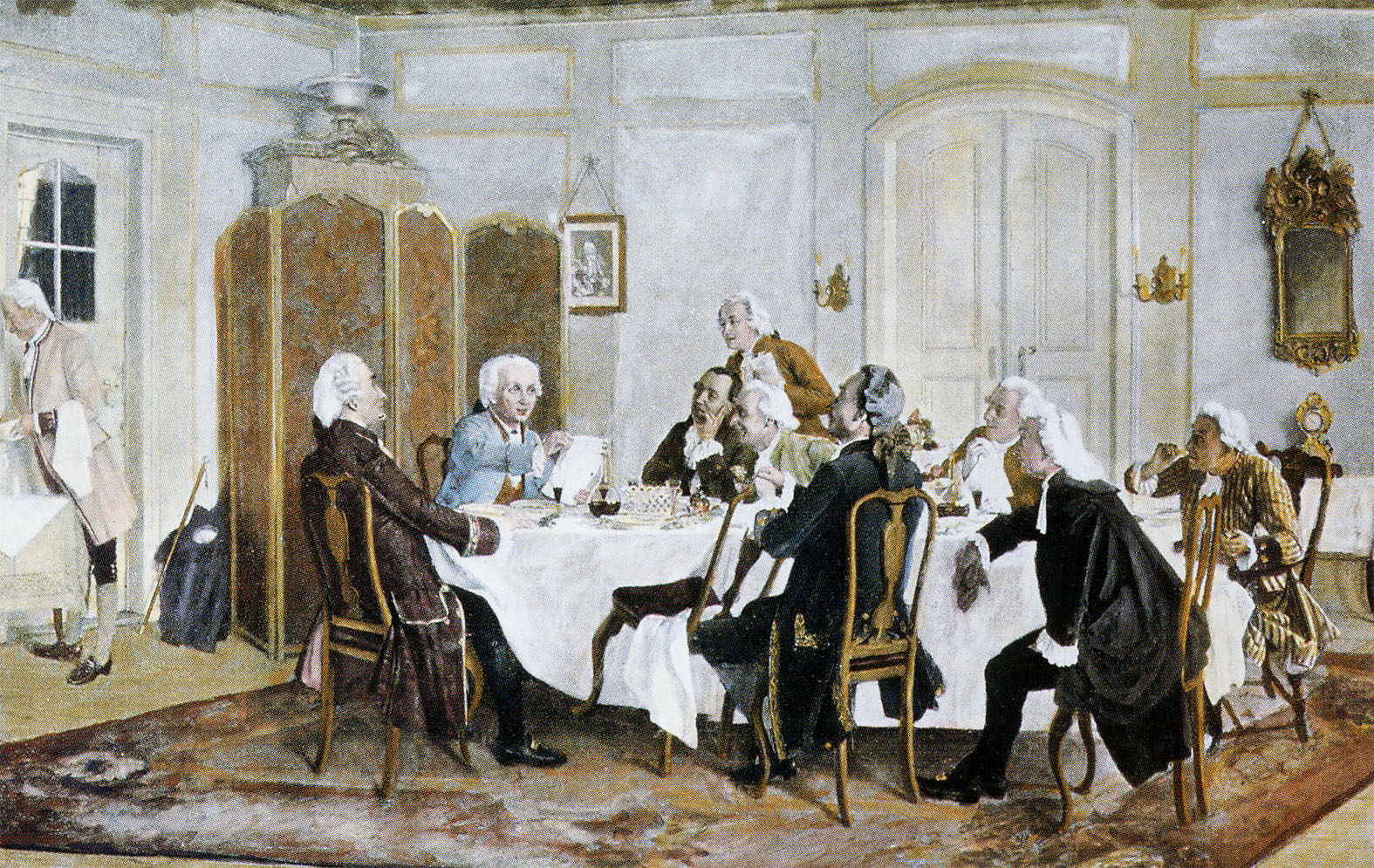
Kant with friends, including Christian Jakob Kraus, Johann Georg Hamann, Theodor Gottlieb von Hippel, and Karl Gottfried Hagen

He also wrote a number of semi-popular essays on history, religion, politics, and other topics. These works were well received by Kant's contemporaries and confirmed his preeminent status in eighteenth-century philosophy. There were several journals devoted solely to defending and criticizing Kantian philosophy. Despite his success, philosophical trends were moving in another direction. Many of Kant's most important disciples and followers (including Karl Leonhard Reinhold, Jakob Sigismund Beck, and Johann Gottlieb Fichte) transformed the Kantian position. The progressive stages of revision of Kant's teachings marked the emergence of German idealism. In what was one of his final acts expounding a stance on philosophical questions, Kant opposed these developments and publicly denounced Fichte in an open letter in 1799.

In 1800, a student of Kant named Gottlob Benjamin Jäsche (1762–1842) published a manual of logic for teachers called Logik, which he had prepared at Kant's request. Jäsche prepared the Logik using a copy of a textbook in logic by Georg Friedrich Meier entitled Excerpt from the Doctrine of Reason, in which Kant had written copious notes and annotations. The Logik has been considered of fundamental importance to Kant's philosophy, and the understanding of it. The great 19th-century logician Charles Sanders Peirce remarked, in an incomplete review of Thomas Kingsmill Abbott's English translation of the introduction to Logik, that "Kant's whole philosophy turns upon his logic." Also, Robert S. Hartman and Wolfgang Schwarz wrote in the translators' introduction to their English translation of the Logik, "Its importance lies not only in its significance for the Critique of Pure Reason, the second part of which is a restatement of fundamental tenets of the Logic, but in its position within the whole of Kant's work."

== Death and burial ==
Kant's health, long poor, worsened. He died in Königsberg on 12 February 1804, uttering Es ist gut ("It is good") before his death. His unfinished final work was published as Opus Postumum. Kant always cut a curious figure in his lifetime for his modest, rigorously scheduled habits, which have been referred to as clocklike. Heinrich Heine observed the magnitude of "his destructive, world-crushing thoughts" and considered him a sort of philosophical "executioner", comparing him to Maximilien Robespierre with the observation that both men "represented in the highest the type of provincial bourgeois. Nature had destined them to weigh coffee and sugar, but Fate determined that they should weigh other things and placed on the scales of the one a king, on the scales of the other a god."

When his body was transferred to a new burial spot, his skull was measured during the exhumation and found to be larger than the average German male's with a "high and broad" forehead. His forehead has been an object of interest ever since it became well known through his portraits: "In Döbler's portrait and in Kiefer's faithful if expressionistic reproduction of it—as well as in many of the other late eighteenth- and early-nineteenth-century portraits of Kant—the forehead is remarkably large and decidedly retreating."

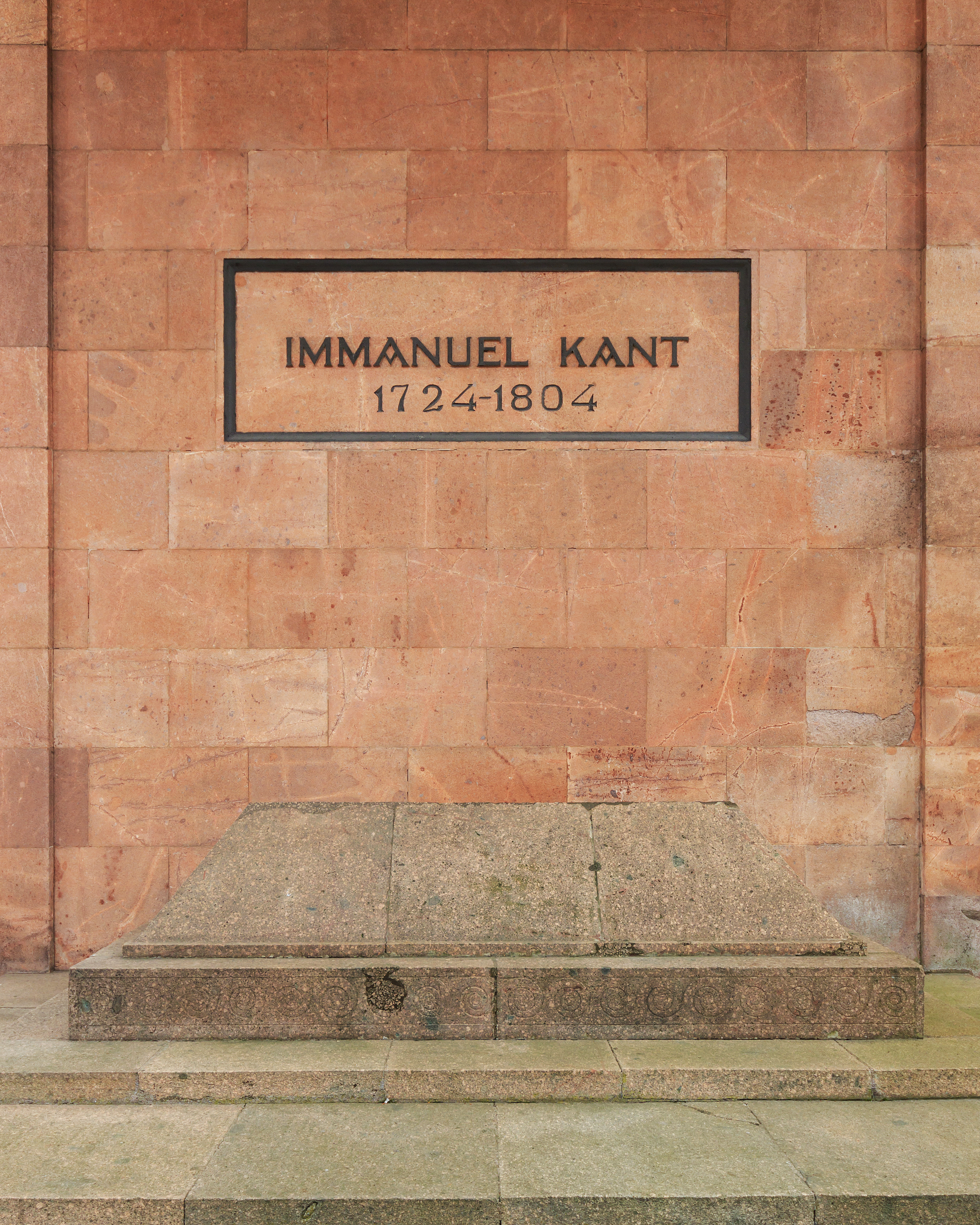
Kant's tomb in Kaliningrad, Russia

Kant's mausoleum adjoins the northeast corner of Königsberg Cathedral in Kaliningrad, Russia. The mausoleum was constructed by the architect Friedrich Lahrs and was finished in 1924, in time for the bicentenary of Kant's birth. Originally, Kant was buried inside the cathedral, but in 1880 his remains were moved to a neo-Gothic chapel adjoining the northeast corner of the cathedral. Over the years, the chapel became dilapidated and was demolished to make way for the mausoleum, which was built on the same location. The tomb and its mausoleum are among the few artifacts of German times preserved by the Soviets after they captured the city.

Into the 21st century, many newlyweds bring flowers to the mausoleum. Artifacts previously owned by Kant, known as Kantiana, were included in the Königsberg City Museum; however, the museum was destroyed during World War II. A replica of the statue of Kant that in German times stood in front of the main University of Königsberg building was donated by a German entity in the early 1990s and placed in the same grounds. After the expulsion of Königsberg's German population at the end of World War II, the University of Königsberg, where Kant taught, was replaced by the Russian-language Kaliningrad State University, which appropriated the campus and surviving buildings. In 2005, the university was renamed Immanuel Kant State University of Russia. The name change, which was considered a politically-charged issue due to the residents having mixed feelings about its German past, was announced at a ceremony attended by Russian president Vladimir Putin and German chancellor Gerhard Schröder, and the university formed a Kant Society, dedicated to the study of Kantianism. In 2010, the university was again renamed to Immanuel Kant Baltic Federal University.

== Philosophy ==
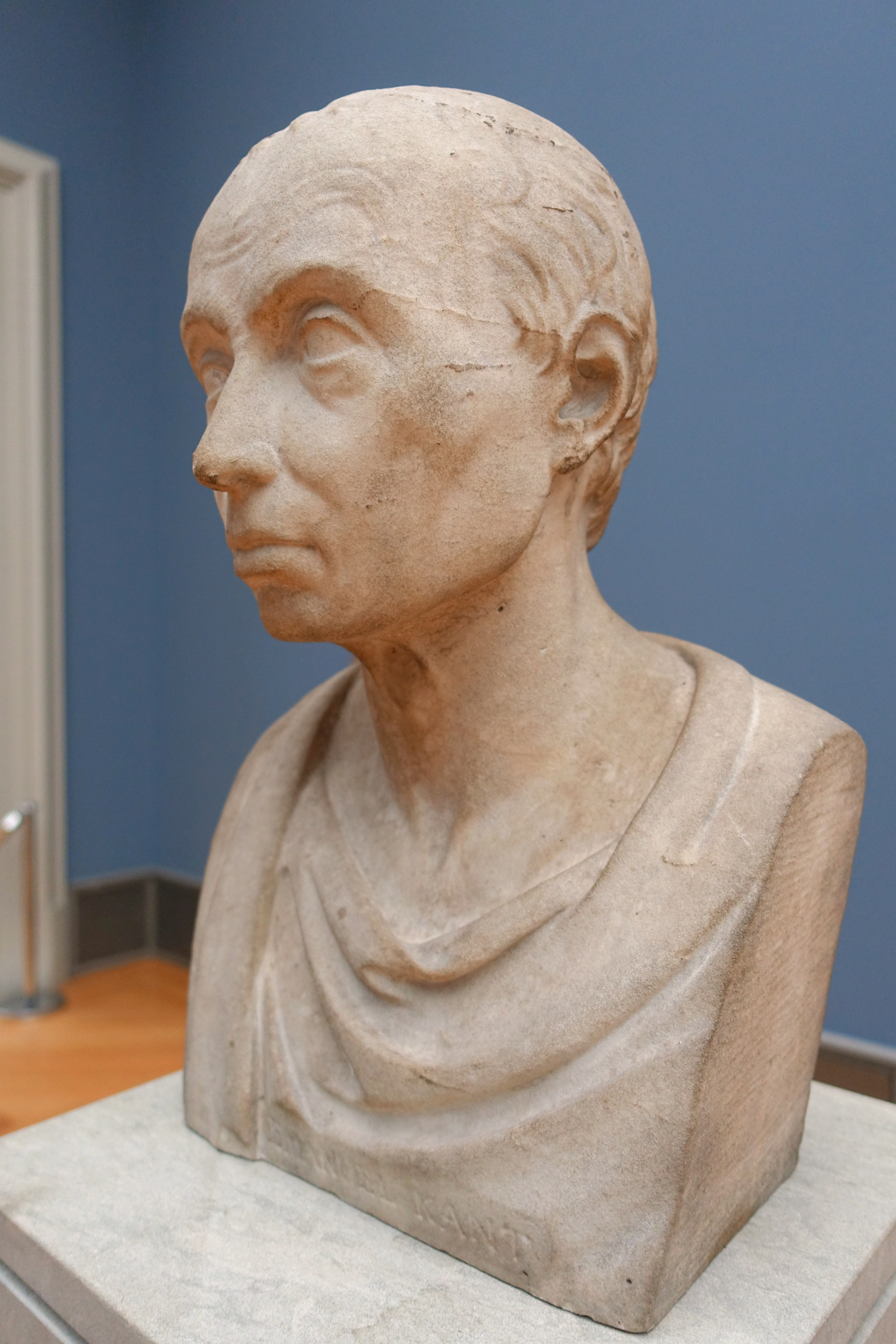
Bust of Kant by Emanuel Bardou, 1798

Like many of his contemporaries, Kant was greatly impressed with the scientific advances made by Sir Isaac Newton and others. This new evidence of the power of human reason called into question for many the traditional authority of politics and religion. In particular, the modern mechanistic view of the world called into question the very possibility of morality; for, if there is no agency, there cannot be any responsibility.

The aim of Kant's critical project is to secure human autonomy, the basis of religion and morality, from this threat of mechanism—and to do so in a way that preserves the advances of modern science. In the Critique of Pure Reason, Kant summarizes his philosophical concerns in the following three questions:

1. What can I know?
2. What should I do?
3. What may I hope?

The Critique of Pure Reason focuses upon the first question and opens a conceptual space for an answer to the second question. It argues that even though we cannot strictly know that we are free, we can—and for practical purposes, must—think of ourselves as free. In Kant's own words, "I had to deny knowledge in order to make room for faith." Kant's moral philosophy is further developed in the Groundwork of the Metaphysics of Morals, the Metaphysics of Morals, and the Critique of Practical Reason.

The Critique of the Power of Judgment argues we may rationally hope for the harmonious unity of the theoretical and practical domains treated in the first two Critiques on the basis of our affective experience of natural beauty and, more generally, the teleological organization of the natural world. In Religion within the Bounds of Mere Reason, Kant endeavors to complete his answer to this third question by arguing for a rationalist form of religion grounded on our practical (i.e., moral) lives.

These works all place the active, rational human subject at the center of the cognitive and moral worlds. In brief, Kant argues that the mind itself necessarily makes a constitutive contribution to knowledge, that this contribution is transcendental rather than psychological, and that to act autonomously is to act according to rational moral principles.

=== Kant's critical project ===
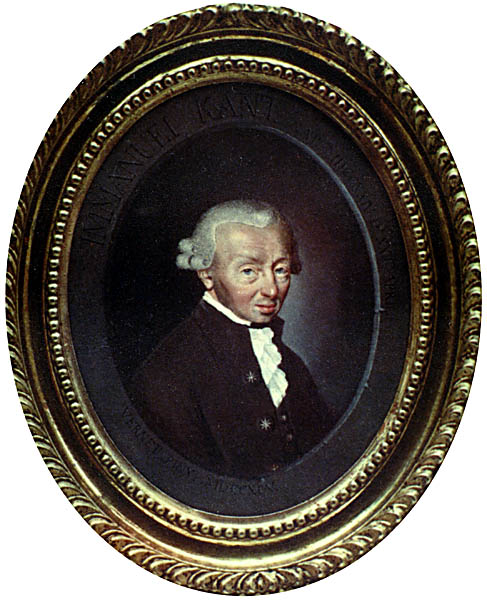
Kant by Carle Vernet

Kant's 1781 (revised 1787) Critique of Pure Reason has often been cited as the most significant volume of metaphysics and epistemology in modern philosophy. In the first Critique, and in later works as well, Kant frames the "general" and "real problem of pure reason" in terms of the following question: "How are synthetic judgments a priori possible?" To understand this claim, it is necessary to define some terms. First, Kant makes a distinction between two sources of knowledge:

1. Cognitions a priori: "cognition independent of all experience and even of all the impressions of the senses".
2. Cognitions a posteriori: cognitions that have their sources in experience—that is, which are empirical.

Second, he makes a distinction between two kinds of judgements:

1. Analytic judgements: judgements in which the predicate concept is contained in the subject concept; e.g., "All bachelors are unmarried", or "All bodies are extended". These can also be called "judgments of clarification".
2. Synthetic judgements: judgements in which the predicate concept is not contained in the subject concept; e.g., "Some bachelors are alone", "All swans are white", or "All bodies have weight". These can also be called "judgments of amplification".

All analytic judgements are a priori since experience is not necessary for analyzing the content of a concept we already possess. By contrast, a synthetic judgement is one whose predicate concept contains something not in the subject concept. The most obvious examples of synthetic judgement are judgments grounded in empirical observations. The two kinds of knowledge and two kinds of judgment yield a fourfold table:

Table of Judgements
	A priori	A posteriori
Analytic	analytic a priori (e.g., "All bodies are extended.")	analytic a posteriori (impossible)
Synthetic	synthetic a priori (e.g., "Every effect has a cause.")	synthetic a posteriori (e.g., "The solar system has eight planets.")

Kant believed that previous philosophers had neglected synthetic a priori judgments, and had paid attention only to analytic a priori and synthetic a posteriori judgments. David Hume, for example, believed that all knowledge is either of "relations of ideas" (which are analytic a priori) or "matters of fact" (which are synthetic a posteriori). Hume's taxonomy excludes the synthetic a priori. But by establishing the synthetic a priori as a third kind of judgment, Kant believes we can push back against Hume's skepticism about such matters as causation and metaphysical knowledge more generally. This is because, unlike merely a posteriori judgments, a priori judgments have "true or strict ... universality" and includes a claim of "necessity". And, unlike merely analytic claims, synthetic judgements extend our knowledge beyond the subject concept. This means that showing how synthetic a priori judgments are possible amounts to showing how substantive knowledge about necessary features of the world is possible.

Kant himself regards it as uncontroversial that we do have synthetic a priori knowledge—especially in mathematics. Consider the proposition '7 + 5 = 12'. Kant claims that the concept of '12' is not contained in the concepts of '5', '7', and the addition operation. Yet, although he considers the possibility of such knowledge to be obvious, Kant nevertheless assumes the burden of showing how such synthetic a priori knowledge in mathematics and the natural sciences is possible, and attacks, in the Transcendental Dialectic, the possibility of synthetic a priori knowledge of traditional metaphysics. It is the twofold aim of the Critique both to prove and to explain the possibility of this knowledge. Kant says "There are two stems of human cognition, which may perhaps arise from a common but to us unknown root, namely sensibility and understanding, through the first of which objects are given to us, but through the second of which they are thought."

Kant's term for the object of sensibility is 'intuition', and his term for the object of the understanding is 'concept'. In general terms, the former is a non-discursive representation of a particular object, and the latter is a discursive (or mediate) representation of a general type of object. The conditions of possible experience require both intuitions and concepts, that is, the affection of the receptive sensibility and the actively synthesizing power of the understanding. (Note: More technically, Kant puts his general point that all genuine knowledge requires both sensory input and intellectual organization by saying that all knowledge requires both "intuitions" and "concepts" (e.g., A 50 / B 74). Intuitions and concepts are two different species of the genus "representation" (Vorstellung), Kant's most general term for any cognitive state (see A 320 / B 376–7). At the outset of the "Transcendental Aesthetic", Kant states that an "intuition" is our most direct or "immediate" kind of representation of objects, in contrast to a "concept" which always represents an object "through a detour (indirecte)"—that is, merely by some "mark" or property that the object has (A 19 / B 33). In his logic textbook, Kant defines an intuition as a "singular representation"—that is, one that represents a particular object—while a concept is always a "universal (repraesentation per notas communes)", which represents properties common to many objects (Logic, §1, 9:91).) Thus the statement: "Thoughts without content are empty, intuitions without concepts are blind." Kant's basic strategy in the first part of Critique of Pure Reason will be to argue that some intuitions and concepts are pure—that is, are contributed entirely by the mind, independent of anything empirical. Knowledge generated on this basis, under certain conditions, can be synthetic a priori. This insight is known as Kant's "Copernican Revolution" because just as Copernicus advanced astronomy by way of a radical shift in perspective, so Kant here claims to do the same for metaphysics. The second part of the Critique is the explicitly critical part. In the "Transcendental Dialectic", Kant argues that many of the claims of traditional rationalist metaphysics violate the criteria he claims to establish in the first, "constructive" part of his book and inevitably to contradictions. As Kant observes, however, "human reason, without being moved by the mere vanity of knowing it all, inexorably pushes on, driven by its own need to such questions that cannot be answered by any experiential use of reason". It is the project of the Critique to establish how far reason may legitimately so proceed.

=== Doctrine of transcendental idealism ===
In the section of the Critique entitled "The Transcendental Aesthetic", Kant argues for the doctrine of transcendental idealism. The doctrine is "transcendental" because it explains a necessary condition for the possibility of experience and is a form of "idealism" because those conditions are dependent on features of the mind. The details of the correct interpretation of transcendental idealism are controversial, but there is broad agreement on two basic theses. First, space and time are not things in themselves but are mere forms of intuition (space is the form of outer intuition, and time is the form of inner intuition). Second, we have knowledge only of appearances and not of things in themselves. The second thesis, Kant believes, follows from the first: because our a priori forms of intuition are necessary conditions of the possibility of experience, anything that fall outside what our sensible faculty can receive are unknowable. Nevertheless, although Kant says that space and time are "transcendentally ideal"—the pure forms of human sensibility, rather than part of nature or reality as it is in itself—he also claims that they are "empirically real", by which he means "that 'everything that can come before us externally as an object' is in both space and time, and that our internal intuitions of ourselves are in time". However Kant's doctrine is interpreted, he wished to distinguish his position from the subjective idealism of George Berkeley.

Paul Guyer, although critical of many of Kant's arguments in this section, writes of the Transcendental Aesthetic that it "not only lays the first stone in Kant's constructive theory of knowledge; it also lays the foundation for both his critique and his reconstruction of traditional metaphysics. It argues that all genuine knowledge requires a sensory component, and thus that metaphysical claims that transcend the possibility of sensory confirmation can never amount to knowledge."

==== Interpretive disagreements ====
One interpretation, known as the "two-aspect" (or "one-world") interpretation, takes transcendental idealism to be, most fundamentally, an epistemological thesis. On this reading of Kant, popularized especially by Henry E. Allison, the thing-in-itself and the phenomenal appearance are the same object, and transcendental idealism is a thesis about what is necessary for finite, discursive minds to consider objects as they are given to us by sensibility. Some commentators, while agreeing that there is just one set of objects, take transcendental idealism to be a thesis about the properties of those objects, some of which we have access to, and others of which are unknowable to us.

The other prominent line of interpretation is the "two-world" view (sometimes associated with "phenomenalist" interpretations). On this view, appearances are not the same things as things in themselves, and transcendental idealism is not merely a thesis about what is necessary for us to consider objects that are transcendentally independent of us. Some "two-world" advocates take Kant to be claiming that appearances are identical to our representations of them, while others take him to be merely claiming that appearances are partly grounded in things in themselves without being identical to them.

=== Kant's theory of judgment ===
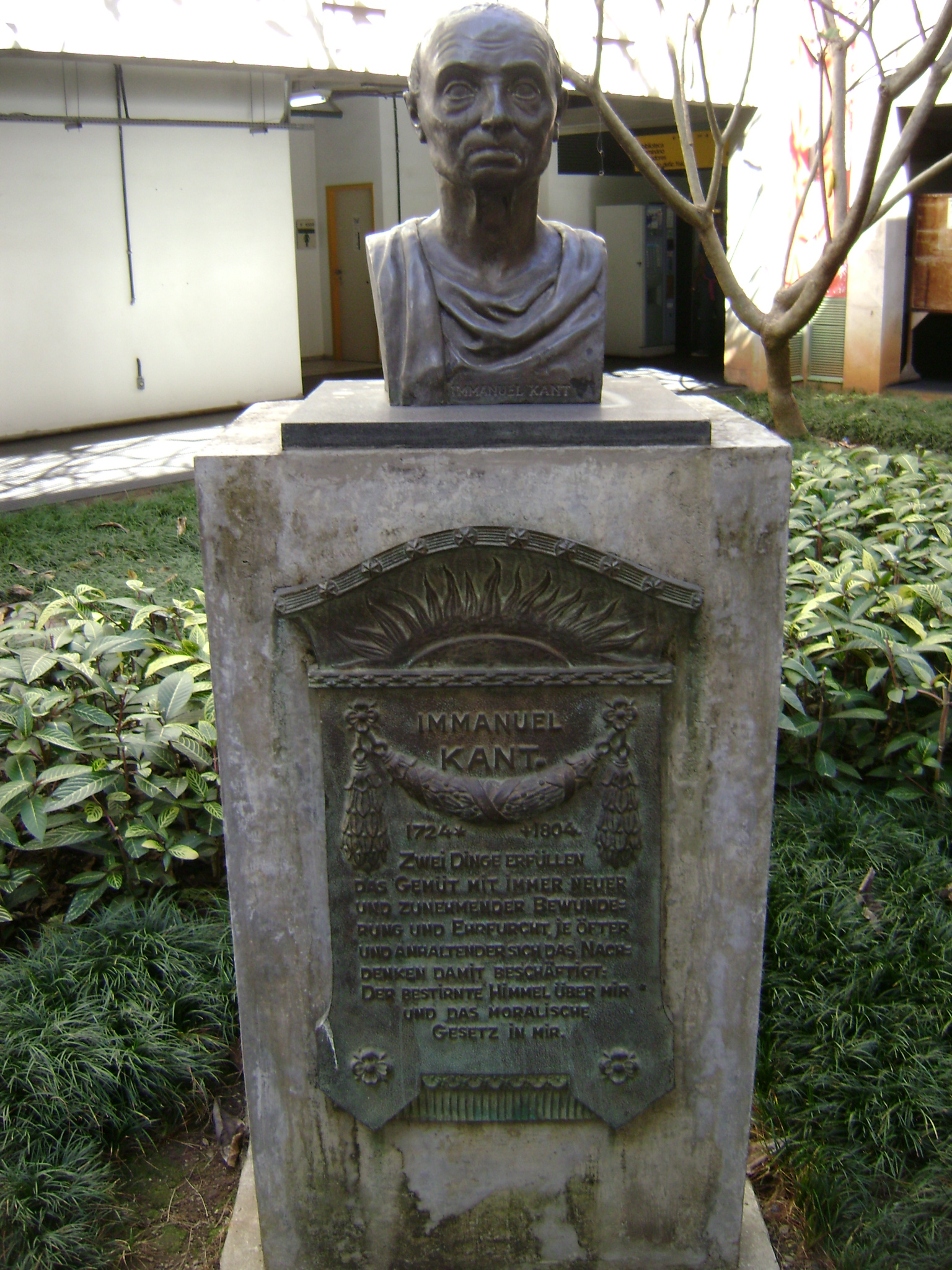
Kant statue in the School of Philosophy and Human Sciences (FAFICH) in the Federal University of Minas Gerais (UFMG), Belo Horizonte, Brazil

Following the "Transcendental Analytic" is the "Transcendental Logic". Whereas the former was concerned with the contributions of the sensibility, the latter is concerned, first, with the contributions of the understanding ("Transcendental Analytic") and, second, with the faculty of reason as the source of both metaphysical errors and genuine regulatory principles ("Transcendental Dialectic"). The "Transcendental Analytic" is further divided into two sections. The first, "Analytic of Concepts", is concerned with establishing the universality and necessity of the pure concepts of the understanding (i.e., the categories). This section contains Kant's famous "transcendental deduction". The second, "Analytic of Principles", is concerned with the application of those pure concepts in empirical judgments. This second section is longer than the first and is further divided into many sub-sections.

==== Transcendental deduction of the categories of the understanding ====
The "Analytic of Concepts" argues for the universal and necessary validity of the pure concepts of the understanding, or the categories, for instance, the concepts of substance and causation. These twelve basic categories define what it is to be a thing in general—that is, they articulate the necessary conditions according to which something is a possible object of experience. These, in conjunction with the a priori forms of intuition, are the basis of all synthetic a priori cognition. According to Paul Guyer and Allen W. Wood, "Kant's idea is that just as there are certain essential features of all judgments, so there must be certain corresponding ways in which we form the concepts of objects so that judgments may be about objects."

Kant provides two central lines of argumentation in support of his claims about the categories. The first, known as the "metaphysical deduction", proceeds analytically from a table of the Aristotelian logical functions of judgment. As Kant was aware, this assumes precisely what the skeptic rejects, namely, the existence of synthetic a priori cognition. For this reason, Kant also supplies a synthetic argument that does not depend upon the assumption in dispute.

This argument, provided under the heading "Transcendental Deduction of the Pure Concepts of the Understanding", is widely considered to be both the most important and the most difficult of Kant's arguments in the Critique. Kant himself said that it is the one that cost him the most labor. Frustrated by its confused reception in the first edition of his book, he rewrote it entirely for the second edition.

The "Transcendental Deduction" gives Kant's argument that these pure concepts apply universally and necessarily to the objects that are given in experience. According to Guyer and Wood, "He centers his argument on the premise that our experience can be ascribed to a single identical subject, via what he calls the 'transcendental unity of apperception,' only if the elements of experience given in intuition are synthetically combined so as to present us with objects that are thought through the categories."

Kant's principle of apperception is that "The I think must be able to accompany all my representations; for otherwise something would be represented in me that could not be thought at all, which is as much as to say that the representation would either be impossible or else at least would be nothing for me." The necessary possibility of the self-ascription of the representations of self-consciousness, identical to itself through time, is an a priori conceptual truth that cannot be based on experience. This is only a bare sketch of one of the arguments that Kant presents.

==== Principles of pure understanding ====
Kant's deduction of the categories in the "Analytic of Concepts", if successful, demonstrates its claims about the categories only in an abstract way. The task of the "Analytic of Principles" is to show both that they must universally apply to objects given in actual experience (i.e., manifolds of intuition) and how it is they do so. In the first book of this section on the "schematism", Kant connects each of the purely logical categories of the understanding to the temporality of intuition to show that, although non-empirical, they do have purchase upon the objects of experience. The second book continues this line of argument in four chapters, each associated with one of the category groupings. In some cases, it adds a connection to the spatial dimension of intuition to the categories it analyzes. The fourth chapter of this section, "The Analogies of Experience", marks a shift from "mathematical" to "dynamical" principles, that is, to those that deal with relations among objects. Some commentators consider this the most significant section of the Critique. The analogies are three in number:

1. Principle of persistence of substance: Kant is here concerned with the general conditions of determining time-relations among the objects of experience. He argues that the unity of time implies that "all change must consist in the alteration of states in an underlying substance, whose existence and quantity must be unchangeable or conserved."
2. Principle of temporal succession according to the law of causality: Here Kant argues that "we can make determinate judgments about the objective succession of events, as contrasted to merely subjective successions of representations, only if every objective alteration follows a necessary rule of succession, or a causal law." This is Kant's most direct rejoinder to Hume's skepticism about causality.
3. Principle of simultaneity according to the law of reciprocity or community: The final analogy argues that "determinate judgments that objects (or states of substance) in different regions of space exists simultaneously are possible only if such objects stand in mutual causal relation of community or reciprocal interaction." This is Kant's rejoinder to Leibniz's thesis in the Monadology.

The fourth section of this chapter, which is not an analogy, deals with the empirical use of the modal categories. That was the end of the chapter in the A edition of the Critique. The B edition includes one more short section, "The Refutation of Idealism". In this section, by analysis of the concept of self-consciousness, Kant argues that his transcendental idealism is a "critical" or "formal" idealism that does not deny the existence of reality apart from our subjective representations. The final chapter of "The Analytic of Principles" distinguishes phenomena, of which we can have genuine knowledge, from noumena, a term which refers to objects of pure thought that we cannot know, but to which we may still refer "in a negative sense". An Appendix to the section further develops Kant's criticism of Leibnizian-Wolffian rationalism by arguing that its "dogmatic" metaphysics confuses the "mere features of concepts through which we think things ... [with] features of the objects themselves". Against this, Kant reasserts his own insistence upon the necessity of a sensible component in all genuine knowledge.

=== Critique of metaphysics ===
The second of the two Divisions of "The Transcendental Logic", "The Transcendental Dialectic", contains the "negative" portion of Kant's Critique, which builds upon the "positive" arguments of the preceding "Transcendental Analytic" to expose the limits of metaphysical speculation. In particular, it is concerned to demonstrate as spurious the efforts of reason to arrive at knowledge independent of sensibility. This endeavor, Kant argues, is doomed to failure, which he claims to demonstrate by showing that reason, unbounded by sense, is always capable of generating opposing or otherwise incompatible conclusions. Like "the light dove, in free flight cutting through the air, the resistance of which it feels", reason "could get the idea that it could do even better in airless space". Against this, Kant claims that, absent epistemic friction, there can be no knowledge. Nevertheless, Kant's critique is not entirely destructive. He presents the speculative excesses of traditional metaphysics as inherent in our very capacity of reason. Moreover, he argues that its products are not without some (carefully qualified) regulative value.

==== On the concepts of pure reason ====
Kant calls the basic concepts of metaphysics "ideas". They are different from the concepts of understanding in that they are not limited by the critical stricture limiting knowledge to the conditions of possible experience and its objects. "Transcendental illusion" is Kant's term for the tendency of reason to produce such ideas. Although reason has a "logical use" of simply drawing inferences from principles, in "The Transcendental Dialectic", Kant is concerned with its purportedly "real use" to arrive at conclusions by way of unchecked regressive syllogistic ratiocination. The three categories of relation, pursued without regard to the limits of possible experience, yield the three central ideas of traditional metaphysics:

1. The soul: the concept of substance as the ultimate subject;
2. The world in its entirety: the concept of causation as a completed series; and
3. God: the concept of community as the common ground of all possibilities.

Although Kant denies that these ideas can be objects of genuine cognition, he argues that they are the result of reason's inherent drive to unify cognition into a systematic whole. Leibnizian-Wolffian metaphysics was divided into four parts: ontology, psychology, cosmology, and theology. Kant replaces the first with the positive results of the first part of the Critique. He proposes to replace the following three with his later doctrines of anthropology, the metaphysical foundations of natural science, and the critical postulation of human freedom and morality.

==== Dialectical inferences of pure reason ====
In the second of the two Books of "The Transcendental Dialectic", Kant undertakes to demonstrate the contradictory nature of unbounded reason. He does this by developing contradictions in each of the three metaphysical disciplines that he contends are in fact pseudosciences. This section of the Critique is long and Kant's arguments are extremely detailed. In this context, it not possible to do much more than enumerate the topics of discussion. The first chapter addresses what Kant terms the paralogisms—i.e., false inferences—that pure reason makes in the metaphysical discipline of rational psychology. He argues that one cannot take the mere thought of "I" in the proposition "I think" as the proper cognition of "I" as an object. In this way, he claims to debunk various metaphysical theses about the substantiality, unity, and self-identity of the soul. The second chapter, which is the longest, takes up the topic Kant calls the antinomies of pure reason—that is, the contradictions of reason with itself—in the metaphysical discipline of rational cosmology. Originally, Kant had thought that all transcendental illusion could be analyzed in antinomic terms. He presents four cases in which he claims reason is able to prove opposing theses with equal plausibility:

1. That "reason seems to be able to prove that the universe is both finite and infinite in space and time";
2. that "reason seems to be able to prove that matter both is and is not infinitely divisible into ever smaller parts";
3. that "reason seems to be able to prove that free will cannot be a causally efficacious part of the world (because all of nature is deterministic) and yet that it must be such a cause"; and,
4. that "reason seems to be able to prove that there is and there is not a necessary being (which some would identify with God)".

Kant further argues in each case that his doctrine of transcendental idealism is able to resolve the antinomy. The third chapter examines fallacious arguments about God in rational theology under the heading of the "Ideal of Pure Reason". (Whereas an idea is a pure concept generated by reason, an ideal is the concept of an idea as an individual thing.) Here Kant addresses and claims to refute three traditional arguments for the existence of God: the ontological argument, the cosmological argument, and the physio-theological argument (i.e., the argument from design). The results of the transcendental dialectic so far appear to be entirely negative. In an Appendix to this section, Kant rejects such a conclusion. The ideas of pure reason, he argues, have an important regulatory function in directing and organizing our theoretical and practical inquiry. Kant's later works elaborate upon this function at length and in detail.

=== Moral thought ===
Kant developed his ethics, or moral philosophy, in three works: Groundwork of the Metaphysics of Morals (1785), Critique of Practical Reason (1788), and Metaphysics of Morals (1797). With regard to morality, Kant argued that the source of the good lies not in anything outside the human subject, either in nature or given by God, but rather is only the good will itself. A good will is one that acts from duty in accordance with the universal moral law that the autonomous human being freely gives itself. This law obliges one to treat humanity—understood as rational agency, and represented through oneself as well as others—as an end in itself rather than (merely) as means to other ends the individual might hold. Kant is known for his theory that all moral obligation is grounded in what he calls the "categorical imperative", which is derived from the concept of duty. He argues that the moral law is a principle of reason itself, not based on contingent facts about the world, such as what would make us happy; to act on the moral law has no other motive than "worthiness to be happy". Nevertheless, experts largely agree that Kant's ethics predate in most of its central ideas the critical period.

==== Idea of freedom ====
In the Critique of Pure Reason, Kant distinguishes between the transcendental idea of freedom, which as a psychological concept is "mainly empirical" and refers to "whether a faculty of beginning a series of successive things or states from itself is to be assumed", and the practical concept of freedom as the independence of our will from the "coercion" or "necessitation through sensuous impulses". Kant finds it a source of difficulty that the practical idea of freedom is founded on the transcendental idea of freedom, but for the sake of practical interests uses the practical meaning, taking "no account of ... its transcendental meaning", which he feels was properly "disposed of" in the Third Antinomy, and as an element in the question of the freedom of the will is for philosophy "a real stumbling block" that has embarrassed speculative reason.

Kant calls practical "everything that is possible through freedom"; he calls the pure practical laws that are never given through sensuous conditions, but are held analogously with the universal law of causality, moral laws. Reason can give us only the "pragmatic laws of free action through the senses", but pure practical laws given by reason a priori dictate "what is to be done". Kant's categories of freedom function primarily as conditions for the possibility for actions (i) to be free, (ii) to be understood as free, and (iii) to be morally evaluated. For Kant, although actions as theoretical objects are constituted by means of the theoretical categories, actions as practical objects (objects of practical use of reason, and which can be good or bad) are constituted by means of the categories of freedom. Only in this way can actions, as phenomena, be a consequence of freedom, and be understood and evaluated as such.

==== Categorical imperative ====
Kant makes a distinction between categorical and hypothetical imperatives. A hypothetical imperative is one that must be obeyed to satisfy contingent desires. A categorical imperative binds rational agents regardless of their desires: for example, all rational agents have a duty to respect other rational agents as individual ends in themselves, regardless of circumstances, even though it is sometimes in one's selfish interest to not do so. These imperatives are morally binding because of the categorical form of their maxims, rather than contingent facts about an agent. Unlike hypothetical imperatives, which bind us insofar as we are part of a group or society which we owe duties to, we cannot opt out of the categorical imperative, because we cannot opt out of being rational agents. We owe a duty to rationality by virtue of being rational agents; therefore, rational moral principles apply to all rational agents at all times. Stated in other terms, with all forms of instrumental rationality excluded from morality, "the moral law itself, Kant holds, can only be the form of lawfulness itself, because nothing else is left once all content has been rejected".

Kant provides three formulations for the categorical imperative. He claims that these are necessarily equivalent, as all being expressions of the pure universality of the moral law as such; many scholars are not convinced. The formulas are as follows:

- Formula of Universal Law:
  - "Act only in accordance with that maxim through which you at the same time can will that it become a universal law"; alternatively,
    - Formula of the Law of Nature: "So act, as if the maxim of your action were to become through your will a universal law of nature."
- Formula of Humanity as End in Itself:
  - "So act that you use humanity, as much in your own person as in the person of every other, always at the same time as an end and never merely as a means".
- Formula of Autonomy:
  - "the idea of the will of every rational being as a will giving universal law", or "Not to choose otherwise than so that the maxims of one's choice are at the same time comprehended with it in the same volition as universal law"; alternatively,
    - Formula of the Realm of Ends: "Act in accordance with maxims of a universally legislative member for a merely possible realm of ends."

Kant defines maxim as a "subjective principle of volition", which is distinguished from an "objective principle or 'practical law.'" While "the latter is valid for every rational being and is a 'principle according to which they ought to act[,]' a maxim 'contains the practical rule which reason determines in accordance with the conditions of the subject (often their ignorance or inclinations) and is thus the principle according to which the subject does act.'"

Maxims fail to qualify as practical laws if they produce a contradiction in conception or a contradiction in the will when universalized. A contradiction in conception happens when, if a maxim were to be universalized, it ceases to make sense, because the "maxim would necessarily destroy itself as soon as it was made a universal law". For example, if the maxim 'It is permissible to break promises' was universalized, no one would trust any promises made, so the idea of a promise would become meaningless; the maxim would be self-contradictory because, when it is universalized, promises cease to be meaningful. The maxim is not moral because it is logically impossible to universalize—that is, we could not conceive of a world where this maxim was universalized. A maxim can also be immoral if it creates a contradiction in the will when universalized. This does not mean a logical contradiction, but that universalizing the maxim leads to a state of affairs that no rational being would desire.

==== "The Doctrine of Virtue" ====
As Kant explains in the 1785 Groundwork of the Metaphysics of Morals and as its title directly indicates, that text is "nothing more than the search for and establishment of the supreme principle of morality". His promised Metaphysics of Morals was much delayed and did not appear until its two parts, "The Doctrine of Right" and "The Doctrine of Virtue", were published separately in 1797 and 1798. The first deals with political philosophy, the second with ethics. "The Doctrine of Virtue" provides "a very different account of ordinary moral reasoning" than the one suggested by the Groundwork. It is concerned with duties of virtue or "ends that are at the same time duties". It is here, in the domain of ethics, that the greatest innovation by The Metaphysics of Morals is to be found. According to Kant's account, "ordinary moral reasoning is fundamentally teleological—it is reasoning about what ends we are constrained by morality to pursue, and the priorities among these ends we are required to observe".

There are two sorts of ends that it is our duty to have: our own perfection and the happiness of others (MS 6:385). "Perfection" includes both our natural perfection (the development of our talents, skills, and capacities of understanding) and moral perfection (our virtuous disposition) (MS 6:387). A person's "happiness" is the greatest rational whole of the ends the person set for the sake of her own satisfaction (MS 6:387–388).

Kant's elaboration of this teleological doctrine offers up a moral theory very different from the one typically attributed to him on the basis of his foundational works alone.

=== Political philosophy ===
In Towards Perpetual Peace: A Philosophical Project, Kant listed several conditions that he thought necessary for ending wars and creating a lasting peace. They included a world of constitutional republics. His republican theory was extended in the "Doctrine of Right", the first part of the Metaphysics of Morals (1797). Kant believed that universal history leads to the ultimate world of republican states at peace, but his theory was not pragmatic. The process was described in Perpetual Peace as natural rather than rational:

What affords this guarantee (surety) is nothing less than the great artist nature (natura daedala rerum) from whose mechanical course purposiveness shines forth visibly, letting concord arise by means of the discord between human beings even against their will; and for this reason nature, regarded as necessitation by a cause the laws of whose operation are unknown to us, is called fate, but if we consider its purposiveness in the course of the world as the profound wisdom of a higher cause directed to the objective final end of the human race and predetermining this course of the world, it is called providence.

Kant's political thought can be summarized as republican government and international organization: "In more characteristically Kantian terms, it is doctrine of the state based upon the law (Rechtsstaat) and of eternal peace. Indeed, in each of these formulations, both terms express the same idea: that of legal constitution or of 'peace through law.'" "Kant's political philosophy, being essentially a legal doctrine, rejects by definition the opposition between moral education and the play of passions as alternate foundations for social life. The state is defined as the union of men under law. The state rightly so called is constituted by laws which are necessary a priori because they flow from the very concept of law. A regime can be judged by no other criteria nor be assigned any other functions, than those proper to the lawful order as such."

Kant opposed "democracy", which at his time meant direct democracy, believing that majority rule posed a threat to individual liberty. He stated that "democracy in the strict sense of the word is necessarily a despotism because it establishes an executive power in which all decide for and, if need be, against one (who thus does not agree), so that all, who are nevertheless not all, decide; and this is a contradiction of the general will with itself and with freedom."

As with most writers at the time, Kant distinguished three forms of government—namely, democracy, aristocracy, and monarchy—with mixed government as the most ideal form of it. He believed in republican ideals and forms of governance, and rule of law brought on by them. Although Kant published this as a "popular piece", Mary J. Gregor points out that two years later, in The Metaphysics of Morals, Kant claims to demonstrate systematically that "establishing universal and lasting peace constitutes not merely a part of the doctrine of right, but rather the entire final end of the doctrine of right within the limits of mere reason".

Kant's later political philosophy was deeply concerned with the problem of war and the possibility of establishing a durable peace among states. In Toward Perpetual Peace (1795), he argued that lasting peace could not be secured merely through treaties but required republican constitutions, respect for international law, and a voluntary federation of free states. He opposed wars of conquest, standing armies, and political practices that encouraged future conflicts, and he regarded the progressive development of lawful international relations as one of humanity's central political tasks.

The Doctrine of Right, published in 1797, contains Kant's most mature and systematic contribution to political philosophy. It addresses duties according to law, which are "concerned only with protecting the external freedom of individuals" and indifferent to incentives. Although there is a moral duty "to limit ourselves to actions that are right, that duty is not part of [right] itself". Its basic political idea is that "each person's entitlement to be his or her own master is only consistent with the entitlements of others if public legal institutions are in place". He formulates the universal principle of right as:

Any action is right if it can coexist with everyone's freedom in accordance with a universal law, or if on its maxim the freedom of choice of each can coexist with everyone's freedom in accordance with a universal law. (MS 6:230).

=== Religious writings ===
Starting in the 20th century, commentators tended to see Kant as having a strained relationship with religion, although in the nineteenth century this had not been the prevalent view. Karl Leonhard Reinhold, whose letters helped make Kant famous, wrote: "I believe that I may infer without reservation that the interest of religion, and of Christianity in particular, accords completely with the result of the Critique of Reason." According to Johann Friedrich Schultz, who wrote one of the first commentaries on Kant: "And does not this system itself cohere most splendidly with the Christian religion? Do not the divinity and beneficence of the latter become all the more evident?" The reason for these views was Kant's moral theology and the widespread belief that his philosophy was the great antithesis to Spinozism, which was widely seen as a form of sophisticated pantheism or even atheism. As Kant's philosophy disregarded the possibility of arguing for God through pure reason alone, for the same reasons it also disregarded the possibility of arguing against God through pure reason alone.

Kant directs his strongest criticisms of the organization and practices of religious organizations at those that encourage what he sees as a religion of counterfeit service to God. Among the major targets of his criticism are external ritual, superstition, and a hierarchical church order. He sees these as efforts to make oneself pleasing to God in ways other than conscientious adherence to the principle of moral rightness in choosing and acting upon one's maxims. Kant's criticisms on these matters, along with his rejection of certain theoretical proofs for the existence of God that were grounded in pure reason (particularly the ontological argument) and his philosophical commentary on some Christian doctrines, have resulted in interpretations that see Kant as hostile to religion in general and to Christianity in particular. Other interpreters, nevertheless, consider that Kant was trying to mark off defensible from indefensible Christian belief.

Regarding Kant's conception of religion, some critics have argued that he was sympathetic to deism. Other critics have argued that Kant's moral conception moves from deism to theism (as moral theism), for example Allen W. Wood, as well as Merold Westphal. As for Kant's book Religion within the Bounds of Mere Reason, it was emphasized that Kant reduced religiosity to rationality, religion to morality, and Christianity to ethics; however, many interpreters, including Wood, alongside Lawrence Pasternack, now agree with Stephen Palmquist's claim that a better way of reading Kant's Religion is to see him as raising morality to the status of religion.

The German philosopher Josef Schmucker showed that Kant’s critique of the traditional proofs of the existence of God predates his critical period and can be traced to the 1760s, as can the development of his concept of the transcendental ideal.

=== Aesthetics ===
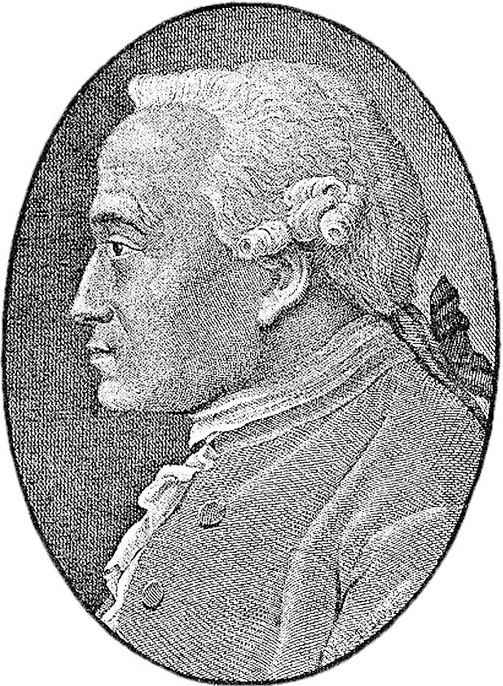
Engraving of Kant by Friedrich Rosmäsler, 1822, from a painting by Todd Schorr

Kant discusses the subjective nature of aesthetic qualities and experiences in Observations on the Feeling of the Beautiful and Sublime (1764). Kant's contribution to aesthetic theory is developed in the Critique of the Power of Judgment (1790), where he investigates the possibility and logical status of "judgments of taste". In the "Critique of Aesthetic Judgment", the first major division of the Critique of the Power of Judgment, Kant used the term "aesthetic" in a manner that resembles its modern sense. In the Critique of Pure Reason, to note essential differences between judgments of taste, moral judgments, and scientific judgments, Kant abandoned the term "aesthetic" as "designating the critique of taste", noting that judgments of taste could never be "directed" by "laws a priori". After Alexander Gottlieb Baumgarten, who wrote Aesthetica (1750–58), (Note: Beardsley, Monroe. "History of Aesthetics". Encyclopedia of Philosophy. Vol. 1, section on "Toward a unified aesthetics", p. 25, Macmillan 1973. Baumgarten coined the term "aesthetics" and expanded, clarified, and unified Wolffian aesthetic theory, but had left the Aesthetica unfinished (See also: Tonelli, Giorgio. "Alexander Gottlieb Baumgarten". Encyclopedia of Philosophy. Vol. 1, Macmillan 1973). In Bernard's translation of the Critique of Judgment he indicates in the notes that Kant's reference in § 15 in regard to the identification of perfection and beauty is probably a reference to Baumgarten.) Kant was one of the first philosophers to develop and integrate aesthetic theory into a unified and comprehensive philosophical system, utilizing ideas that played an integral role throughout his philosophy. In the chapter "Analytic of the Beautiful" in the Critique of the Power of Judgment, Kant states that beauty is not a property of an artwork or natural phenomenon, but is instead consciousness of the pleasure that attends the 'free play' of the imagination and the understanding. Even though it appears that we are using reason to decide what is beautiful, the judgment is not a cognitive judgment, (Note: Kant's general discussions of the distinction between "cognition" and "conscious of" are also given in the Critique of Pure Reason (notably A320/B376), and section V and the conclusion of section VIII of his Introduction in Logic.) "and is consequently not logical, but aesthetical".

A pure judgement of taste is subjective since it refers to the emotional response of the subject and is based upon nothing but esteem for an object itself: it is a disinterested pleasure, and we feel that pure judgements of taste (i.e., judgements of beauty), lay claim to universal validity. This universal validity is not derived from a determinate concept of beauty but from common sense. Kant also believed that a judgment of taste shares characteristics with a moral judgment: both are disinterested, and we hold them to be universal. In the chapter "Analytic of the Sublime," Kant identifies the sublime as an aesthetic quality that, like beauty, is subjective, but unlike beauty, it refers to an indeterminate relationship between the faculties of the imagination and reason. It also shares the character of moral judgments in its engagement with reason. The feeling of the sublime, divided into two distinct modes (the mathematical and the dynamical sublime), describes two subjective moments that concern the relationship of the faculty of the imagination to reason. Some commentators argue that Kant's critical philosophy contains a third kind of the sublime, the moral sublime, which is the aesthetic response to the moral law or a representation, and a development of the "noble" sublime in Kant's theory of 1764.

The mathematical sublime results from the failure of the imagination to comprehend natural objects that appear boundless and formless, or appear "absolutely great". This imaginative failure is then recuperated through the pleasure taken in reason's assertion of the concept of infinity. In this move the faculty of reason proves itself superior to our fallible sensible self. In the dynamical sublime, there is the sense of annihilation of the sensible self as the imagination tries to comprehend a vast might. This power of nature threatens us but through the resistance of reason to such sensible annihilation, the subject feels a pleasure and a sense of the human moral vocation. This appreciation of moral feeling through exposure to the sublime helps to develop moral character. Kant developed a theory of humor, which has been interpreted as an "incongruity" theory. He illustrated his theory of humor by telling three narrative jokes in the Critique of Judgment. He thought that the physiological impact of humor is akin to that of music.

Kant developed a distinction between an object of art as a material value subject to the conventions of society and the transcendental condition of the judgment of taste as a "refined" value in his Idea for a Universal History with a Cosmopolitan Aim (1784). In the Fourth and Fifth Theses of that work he identified all art as the "fruits of unsociableness" due to men's "antagonism in society" and, in the Seventh Thesis, asserted that while such material property is indicative of a civilized state, only the ideal of morality and the universalization of refined value through the improvement of the mind "belongs to culture".

=== Anthropology ===
Kant lectured on anthropology, the study of human nature, for twenty-three years. His Anthropology from a Pragmatic Point of View was published in 1798. Transcripts of Kant's lectures on anthropology were published for the first time in 1997 in German. Kant was among the first people of his time to introduce anthropology as an intellectual area of study, long before the field gained popularity, and his texts are considered to have advanced the field. His point of view was to influence the works of later philosophers such as Martin Heidegger and Paul Ricœur.

Kant was the first to suggest using a dimensionality approach to human diversity. He analyzed the nature of the Hippocrates-Galen four temperaments and plotted in two dimensions "what belongs to a human being's faculty of desire": "his natural aptitude or natural predisposition" and "his temperament or sensibility". Cholerics were described as emotional and energetic, phlegmatics as balanced and weak, sanguines as balanced and energetic, and melancholics as emotional and weak. These two dimensions reappeared in all subsequent models of temperament and personality traits. Kant viewed anthropology in two broad categories: (1) the physiological approach, which he referred to as "what nature makes of the human being"; and (2) the pragmatic approach, which explores the things that a human "can and should make of himself".

==== Views on race ====
Kant's theory of race and his prejudicial beliefs are among the most contentious areas of recent Kant scholarship. While few, if any, dispute the overt racism and chauvinism present in his work, a more contested question is the degree to which it degrades or invalidates his other contributions. His most severe critics assert that Kant intentionally manipulated science to support chattel slavery and discrimination. Others acknowledge that he lived in an era of immature science, with many erroneous beliefs, some racist, all appearing decades before evolution, molecular genetics, and other sciences that today are taken for granted. Kant was one of the most notable Enlightenment thinkers to defend racism. The philosopher Charles W. Mills is unequivocal: "Kant is also seen as one of the central figures in the birth of modern 'scientific' racism. Whereas other contributors to early racial thought like Carolus Linnaeus and Johann Friedrich Blumenbach had offered only 'empirical' (scare-quotes necessary!) observation, Kant produced a full-blown theory of race."

Examples of his racist remarks can be found in Observations on the Feeling of the Beautiful and Sublime, where he dismisses the opinion of a "Negro carpenter" by saying:

There might be something here worth considering, except for the fact that this scoundrel was completely black from head to foot, a distinct proof that what he said was stupid.

He also uses statements from Hume to opine racist views:

The Negroes of Africa have by nature no feeling that rises above the ridiculous. Mr. Hume challenges anyone to adduce a single example where a Negro has demonstrated talents, and asserts that among the hundreds of thousands of blacks who have been transported elsewhere from their countries, although very many of them have been set free, nevertheless not a single one has ever been found who has accomplished something great in art or science or shown any other praiseworthy quality, while among the whites there are always those who rise up from the lowest rabble and through extraordinary gifts earn respect in the world. So essential is the difference between these two human kinds, and it seems to be just as great with regard to the capacities of mind as it is with respect to color. The religion of fetishes which is widespread among them is perhaps a sort of idolatry, which sinks so deeply into the ridiculous as ever seems to be possible for human nature. A bird’s feather, a cow’s horn, a shell, or any other common thing, as soon as it is consecrated with some words, is an object of veneration and of invocation in swearing oaths. The blacks are very vain, but in the Negro’s way, and so talkative that they must be driven apart from each other by blows.

He mocks the customs of non-European lands such as China, India, Japan and Arabia. One such example:

In Peking, when there is an eclipse of the sun or moon, they still carry on the ceremony of driving away with a great noise the dragon that would devour these heavenly bodies, and they preserve a miserable custom from the most ancient times of ignorance, even though one is now better informed.

In his On the Different Races of Man, he uses a lot of scientific racism to describe different races. One such example:

The profusion of iron particles which are otherwise found in the blood of every human being, and, in this case, are precipitated in the net-shaped substance through the evaporation of the phosphoric acid (which explains why all Negroes stink), is the cause of the blackness that shines through the epidermis. The heavy iron content in the blood also seems to be necessary in order to prevent the enervation of all the parts of the body. The oily skin, which weakens the nourishing mucus necessary for the growth of hair, hardly even allows for the production of the wool that covers the head. Besides all this, humid warmth generally promotes the strong growth of animals. In short, all of these factors account for the origin of the Negro, who is well-suited to his climate, namely, strong, fleshy, and agile. However, because he is so amply supplied by his motherland, he is also lazy, indolent, and dawdling.

Justifying the superiority of whites, he writes in the same essay:

Among whites, however, these acids and the volatile alkaline content are not reflected at all because the iron in the bodily juices has been dissolved, thereby demonstrating both the perfect mixing of juices and the strength of this human stock in comparison to others.

Using the four temperaments of ancient Greece, Kant proposed a hierarchy of racial categories including white Europeans, black Africans, and red Native Americans. Although he was a proponent of scientific racism for much of his career, Kant's views on race changed significantly in the last decade of his life, and he ultimately rejected European colonialism in Perpetual Peace: A Philosophical Sketch (1795), and possibly dropped his views on racial hierarchies too (albeit never explicitly repudiating them). (Note: Kant wrote that "[Whites] contain all the impulses of nature in affects and passions, all talents, all dispositions to culture and civilization and can as readily obey as govern. They are the only ones who always advance to perfection." He describes South Asians as "educated to the highest degree but only in the arts and not in the sciences". He goes on that Hindustanis can never reach the level of abstract concepts and that a "great hindustani man" is one who has "gone far in the art of deception and has much money". He states that the Hindus always stay the way they are and can never advance. About black Africans, Kant wrote that "they can be educated but only as servants, that is they allow themselves to be trained". To Kant, "the Negro can be disciplined and cultivated, but is never genuinely civilized. He falls of his own accord into savagery." Native Americans, Kant opined, "cannot be educated". He calls them unmotivated, lacking affect, passion and love, and describes them as too weak for labor, unfit for any culture, and too phlegmatic for diligence. He said that Native Americans are "far below the Negro, who undoubtedly holds the lowest of all remaining levels by which we designate the different races". Kant stated that "Americans and Blacks cannot govern themselves. They thus serve only for slaves.") Kant was an opponent of miscegenation, believing that whites would be "degraded" and that "fusing of races" is undesirable, for "not every race adopts the morals and customs of the Europeans". He states that "instead of assimilation, which was intended by the melting together of the various races, nature has here made a law of just the opposite". Kant was also an antisemite, believing that Jews were incapable of transcending material forces, which a moral order required. In this way, Jews are presented as the opposite of autonomous, rational Christians, and therefore incapable of being incorporated into an ethical Christian society. In his "Anthropology", Kant called the Jews "a nation of cheaters" and portrayed them as "a group that has followed not the path of transcendental freedom but that of enslavement to the material world".

Mills wrote that Kant has been "sanitized for public consumption"; his racist works conveniently ignored. Robert Bernasconi stated that Kant "supplied the first scientific definition of race". Emmanuel Chukwudi Eze is credited with bringing Kant's contributions to racism to light in the 1990s among Western philosophers, who he believed often glossed over this part of his life and works. Pauline Kleingeld argues that, while Kant "did defend a racial hierarchy until at least the end of the 1780s", his views on race changed significantly in works published in the last decade of his life. In particular, she argues that Kant rejected past views related to racial hierarchies and the diminished rights or moral status of non-whites in Perpetual Peace (1795). This work also saw him providing extended arguments against European colonialism, which he claimed was morally unjust and incompatible with the equal rights held by indigenous populations. Kleingeld argues that this shift in Kant's views later in life has often been forgotten or ignored in the literature on Kant's racist anthropology, and that the shift suggests a belated recognition of the fact that racial hierarchy was incompatible with a universalized moral framework.

While Kant's racist rhetoric is indicative of the state of scholarship and science during the 18th century, German philosopher Daniel-Pascal Zorn explains the risk of taking period quotations out of context. Many of Kant's most outrageous quotations are from a series of articles from 1777–1788, a public exchange among Kant, Herder, the natural scientist Georg Forster, and other scholars prominent in that period. Kant asserts that all races of humankind are of the same species, challenging the position of Forster and others that the races were distinct species. While his commentary is clearly biased at times, certain extreme statements were patterned specifically to paraphrase or counter Forster and other authors. By considering the full arc of Kant's scholarship, Zorn notes the progression in both his philosophical and his anthropological works, "with which he argues, against the zeitgeist, for the unity of humanity".

==== Views on women ====
Mason Cash, writing in Minerva, suggested that "one can easily find a deep-seated conservative misogyny" in Kant's writing about women. Kurt Mosser, writing in Kant-studien, said that "throughout his career Kant made a variety of noxious and distasteful comments about women". Dilek Huseyinzadegan, in an article for Feminist Philosophy Quarterly, drew attention to the difficulties feminist philosophers encounter when incorporating Kantian thought so that "we do not reenact, implicitly or explicitly, his problematic claims".

Kant's views on women can be found in his works such as Observations (1764) and Anthropology (1798), in which, by denying women full capacity for moral principles and equal civic status, he treats them as morally and politically subordinate to men, not as complete agents in their own right. Kant believed that men and women are naturally different and ought to develop different kinds of excellence: men are characterized by reason, principles, and the “sublime,” while women are characterized by feeling, beauty, and sentiment. He held that women are intelligent but thought they do not act from abstract moral principles in the same way as men, instead possessing a “beautiful virtue” grounded in sympathy, care, and emotional judgment rather than rational duty. In his early work he viewed this feminine virtue as valuable and socially beneficial, but in his later writings he increasingly denied women the capacity for true moral autonomy, arguing that only rational, principle-governed action constitutes full virtue. As a result, Kant came to see women as unsuited for full moral and political equality, assigning them a primary role in marriage, social harmony, and the refinement of society rather than in independent moral or civic life.

== Influence and legacy ==
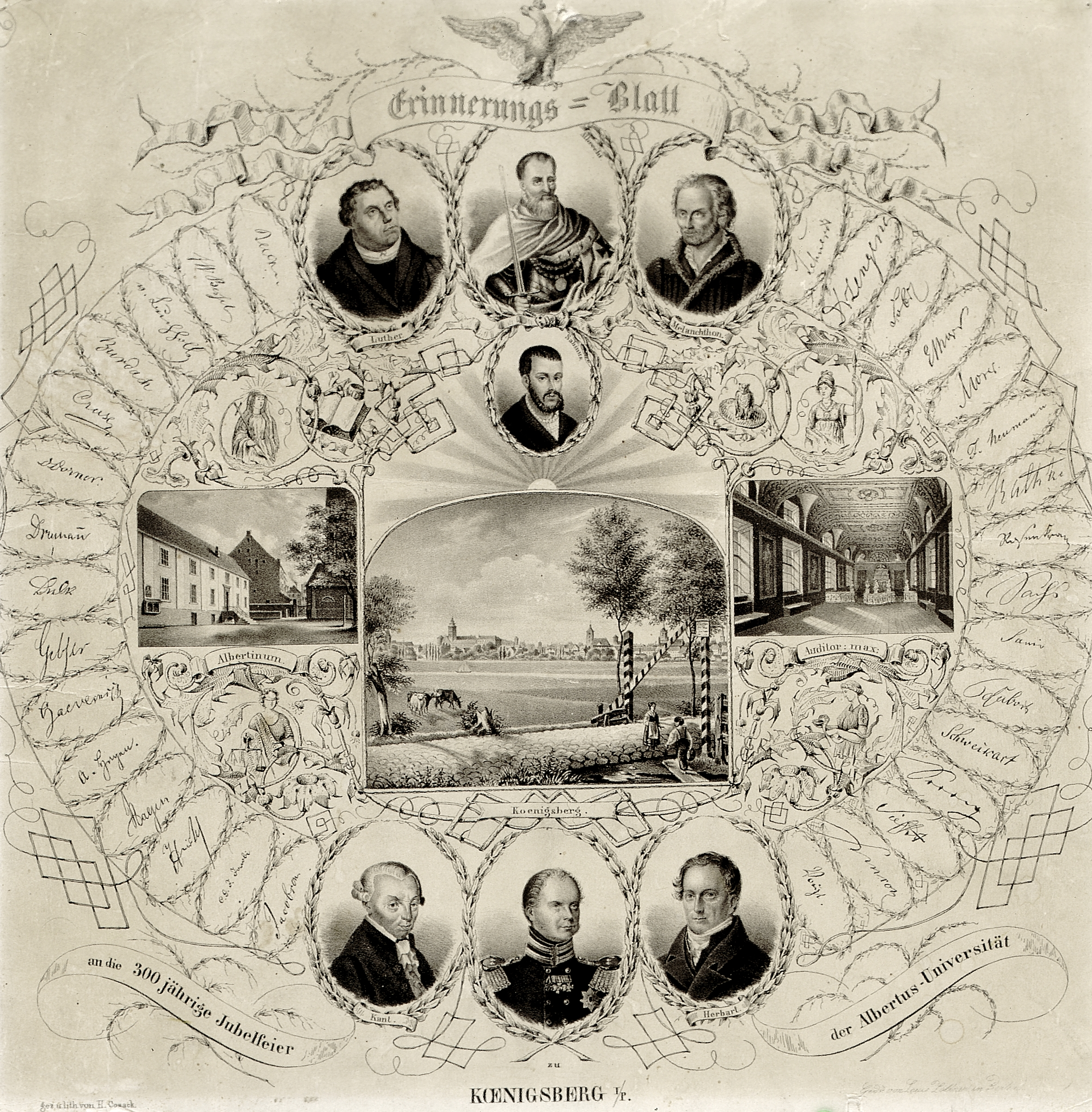
Poster celebrating the 300 years of the University of Königsberg, 1844. Among others, Kant and Johann Friedrich Herbart are honored.

Kant's influence on Western thought has been profound. (Note: Oliver A. Johnson claims, "With the possible exception of Plato's Republic, (Critique of Pure Reason) is the most important philosophical book ever written." Article on Kant within the collection Great thinkers of the Western World, Ian P. McGreal, Ed., HarperCollins, 1992.) Although the basic tenets of Kant's transcendental idealism (i.e., that space and time are a priori forms of human perception rather than real properties and the claim that formal logic and transcendental logic coincide) have been claimed to be falsified by modern science and logic, and no longer set the intellectual agenda of contemporary philosophers, Kant is credited with having innovated the way philosophical inquiry has been carried on at least up to the early nineteenth century. This shift consisted of several closely related innovations that, although highly contentious in themselves, have become important in subsequent philosophy and in the social sciences broadly construed:

- The human subject seen as the center of inquiry into human knowledge, such that it is impossible to philosophize about things as they exist independently of human perception or of how they are "for us";
- the notion that is possible to discover and systematically explore the inherent limits of the human ability to know entirely a priori;
- the notion of the "categorical imperative", an assertion that people are naturally endowed with the ability and obligation toward right reason and acting. Perhaps his most famous quote is drawn from the Critique of Practical Reason: "Two things fill my mind with ever new and increasing admiration and reverence ... : the starry heavens above me and the moral law within me";
- the concept of "conditions of possibility", as in his notion of "the conditions of possible experience"; that is, that things, knowledge, and forms of consciousness rest on prior conditions that make them possible, so that, to understand or to know them, several conditions must be understood:

- the claim that objective experience is actively constituted or constructed by the functioning of the human mind;
- the concept of moral autonomy as central to humanity; and
- the assertion of the principle that human beings should be treated as ends rather than as mere means.

- the analytic-synthetic distinction.

Kant's ideas have been incorporated into a variety of schools of thought. These include German idealism, Marxism, positivism, phenomenology, existentialism, critical theory, linguistic philosophy, structuralism, post-structuralism, and deconstruction.

=== Historical influence ===
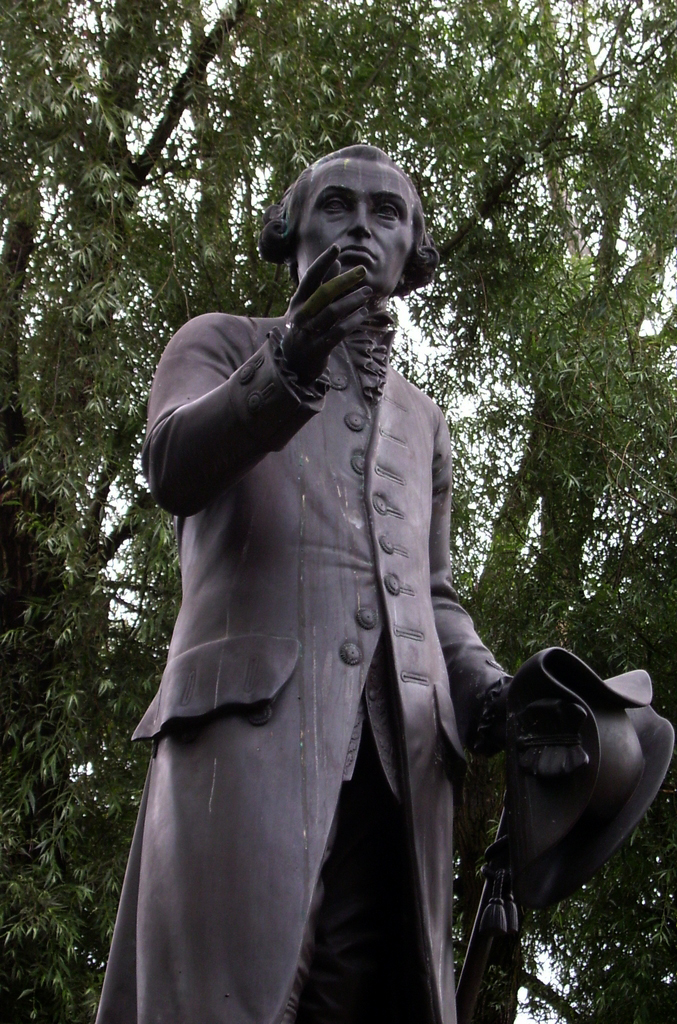
Statue of Kant in Kaliningrad, Russia. Replica by Harald Haacke of the original by Christian Daniel Rauch, which was lost in 1945.

During his own life, much critical attention was paid to Kant's thought. He influenced Reinhold, Fichte, Schelling, Hegel, and Novalis during the 1780s and 1790s. Samuel Taylor Coleridge was greatly influenced by Kant and helped to spread awareness of him, and of German Idealism generally, in the UK and the US. In his Biographia Literaria (1817), he credits Kant's ideas in coming to believe that the mind is not a passive, but an active agent in the apprehension of reality. Hegel was one of Kant's first major critics. In Hegel's view the entire project of setting a "transcendental subject" (i.e., human consciousness) apart from the living individual as well as from nature, history, and society was fundamentally flawed, although parts of that very project could be put to good use in a new direction. Similar concerns motivated Hegel's criticisms of Kant's concept of moral autonomy, to which Hegel opposed an ethic focused on the "ethical life" of the community. (Note: Georg Wilhelm Friedrich Hegel, Natural Law: The Scientific Ways of Treating Natural Law, Its Place in Moral Philosophy, and Its Relation to the Positive Sciences. trans. T.M. Knox. Philadelphia, PA: University of Pennsylvania Press, 1975. Hegel's mature view and his concept of "ethical life" is elaborated in his Philosophy of Right. Hegel, Philosophy of Right. trans. T.M. Knox. Oxford University Press, 1967.) In a sense, Hegel's notion of "ethical life" is meant to subsume, rather than replace, Kantian ethics. And Hegel can be seen as trying to defend Kant's idea of freedom as going beyond finite "desires", by means of reason. Thus, in contrast to later critics like Nietzsche or Russell, Hegel shares some of Kant's concerns. (Note: Robert Pippin's Hegel's Idealism (Cambridge: Cambridge University Press, 1989) emphasizes the continuity of Hegel's concerns with Kant's. Robert Wallace, Hegel's Philosophy of Reality, Freedom, and God (Cambridge: Cambridge University Press, 2005) explains how Hegel's Science of Logic defends Kant's idea of freedom as going beyond finite "inclinations", contra skeptics such as David Hume.)

Kant's thinking on religion was used in Britain by philosophers such as Thomas Carlyle to challenge the nineteenth-century decline in religious faith. British Catholic writers, notably G. K. Chesterton and Hilaire Belloc, followed this approach. Criticisms of Kant were common in the realist views of the new positivism at that time. Arthur Schopenhauer was strongly influenced by Kant's transcendental idealism. Like Friedrich Heinrich Jacobi, Salomon Maimon, Gottlob Ernst Schulze, and Fichte before him, Schopenhauer was critical of Kant's theory of the thing-in-itself. Things-in-themselves, they argued, are neither the cause of what we observe, nor are they completely beyond our access. Ever since the Critique of Pure Reason, philosophers have been critical of Kant's theory of the thing-in-itself. Many have argued that, if such a thing exists beyond experience, then one cannot posit that it affects us causally, since that would entail stretching the category "causality" beyond the realm of experience. (Note: For a review of this problem and the relevant literature see The Thing in Itself and the Problem of Affection in the revised edition of Henry Allison's Kant's Transcendental Idealism.)

With the success and wide influence of Hegel's writings, Kant's own influence began to wane, but a re-examination of his ideas began in Germany in 1865 with the publication of Kant und die Epigonen by Otto Liebmann, whose motto was "Back to Kant". There proceeded an important revival of Kant's theoretical philosophy, known as neo-Kantianism. Kant's notion of "critique" has been more broadly influential. The early German Romantics, especially Friedrich Schlegel in his "Athenaeum Fragments", used Kant's reflexive conception of criticism in their Romantic theory of poetry. Also in aesthetics, Clement Greenberg, in his classic essay "Modernist Painting", uses Kantian criticism, what Greenberg refers to as "immanent criticism", to justify the aims of abstract painting, a movement Greenberg saw as aware of the key limitation—flatness—that makes up the medium of painting. The French philosopher Michel Foucault was also greatly influenced by Kant's notion of "critique" and wrote several pieces on Kant for a re-thinking of the Enlightenment as a form of "critical thought". He went so far as to classify his own philosophy as a "critical history of modernity, rooted in Kant".

Kant believed that mathematical truths were forms of synthetic a priori knowledge, which means they are necessary and universal, yet known through the a priori intuition of space and time, as transcendental preconditions of experience. Kant's often brief remarks about mathematics influenced the mathematical school known as intuitionism, a movement in philosophy of mathematics opposed to David Hilbert's formalism, and Gottlob Frege and Bertrand Russell's logicism. (Note: Körner, Stephan, The Philosophy of Mathematics, Dover, 1986. For an analysis of Kant's writings on mathematics see, Friedman, Michael, Kant and the Exact Sciences, Cambridge, Massachusetts: Harvard University Press, 1992.)

=== Influence on modern thinkers ===
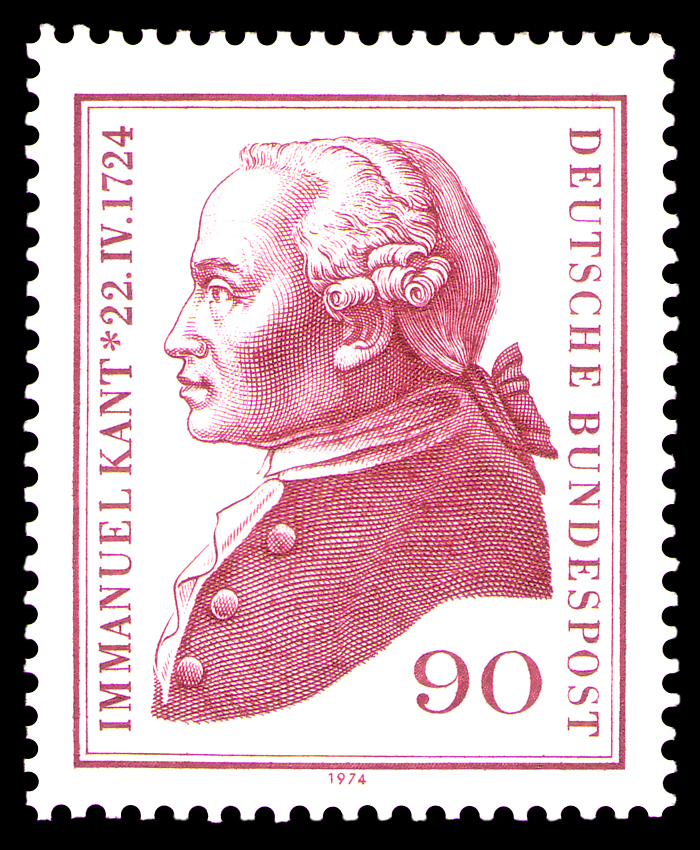
West German postage stamp, 1974, commemorating the 250th anniversary of Kant's birth

With his Perpetual Peace, Kant is considered to have foreshadowed many of the ideas that have come to form the democratic peace theory, one of the main controversies in political science. More concretely, constructivist theorist Alexander Wendt proposed that the anarchy of the international system could evolve from the "brutish" Hobbesian anarchy understood by realist theorists, through Lockean anarchy, and ultimately a Kantian anarchy in which states would see their self-interests as inextricably linked to the well being of other states, thus transforming international politics into a far more peaceful form.

Prominent recent Kantians include the British philosophers P. F. Strawson, (Note: Strawson, P.F., The Bounds of Sense: An Essay on Kant's Critique of Pure Reason. Routledge: 2004. When first published in 1966, this book forced many Anglo-American philosophers to reconsider Kant's Critique of Pure Reason.) Onora O'Neill, and Quassim Cassam, and the American philosophers Wilfrid Sellars, Lewis White Beck and Christine Korsgaard. (Note: Korsgaard, Christine. Creating the Kingdom of Ends. Cambridge; New York: Cambridge University Press, 1996.ISBN 978-0521496445 Not a commentary, but a defense of a broadly Kantian approach to ethics.) Due to the influence of Strawson and Sellars, among others, there has been a renewed interest in Kant's view of the mind. Central to many debates in philosophy of psychology and cognitive science is Kant's conception of the unity of consciousness. (Note: Brook, Andrew. Kant and the Mind. Cambridge: Cambridge University Press, 1994. See also, Meerbote, R. "Kant's Functionalism". In: J.C. Smith, ed. Historical Foundations of Cognitive Science. Dordrecht, Holland: Reidel, 1991. Brook has an article on Kant's View of the Mind in the Stanford Encyclopedia Archived 9 July 2010 at the Wayback Machine)

Jürgen Habermas and John Rawls are two significant political and moral philosophers whose work is strongly influenced by Kant's moral philosophy. (Note: See Habermas, J. Moral Consciousness and Communicative Action. Trans. Christian Lenhardt and Shierry Weber Nicholsen. Cambridge, Massachusetts: MIT Press, 1996. For Rawls see, Rawls, John. Theory of Justice Cambridge, Massachusetts: Harvard University Press, 1971. Rawls has a well-known essay on Kant's concept of good. See, Rawls, "Themes in Kant's Moral Philosophy" in Kant's Transcendental Deductions. Ed. Eckart Förster. Stanford, CA: Stanford University Press, 1989.) They have argued against relativism, supporting the Kantian view that universality is essential to any viable moral philosophy. Mou Zongsan's study of Kant has been cited as a highly crucial part in the development of Mou's personal philosophy, namely New Confucianism. Widely regarded as the most influential Kant scholar in China, Mou's rigorous critique of Kant's philosophy—having translated all three of Kant's critiques—served as an ardent attempt to reconcile Chinese and Western philosophy whilst increasing pressure to Westernize in China.

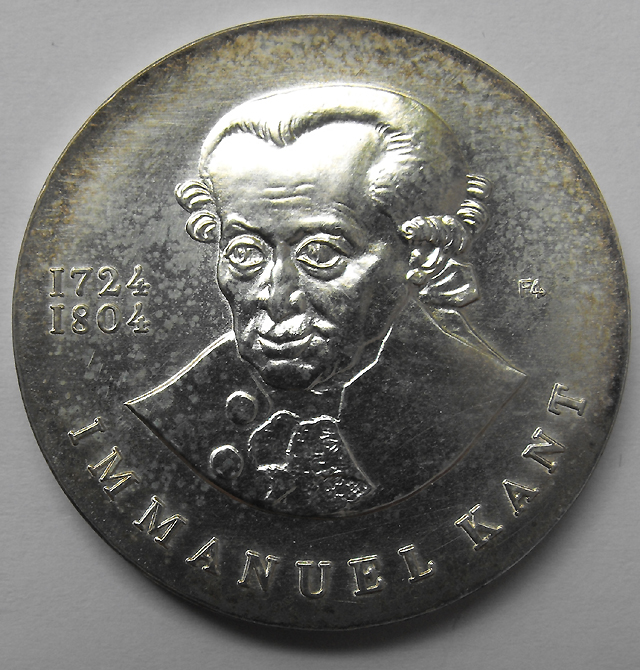
East German commemorative coin honoring Kant, 1974

Because of the thoroughness of Kant's paradigm shift, his influence extends well beyond this to thinkers who neither specifically refer to his work nor use his terminology. Kant's influence extended to the social, behavioral, and physical sciences—as in the sociology of Max Weber, the psychology of Jean Piaget, and Carl Jung. Kant's work on mathematics and synthetic a priori knowledge is also cited by the theoretical physicist Albert Einstein as an early influence on his intellectual development, although it was one which he later criticized and rejected. In the 2020s, there was a renewed interest in Kant's theory of mind from the point of view of formal logic and computer science.

== Bibliography ==
Unless otherwise noted, all citations are to The Cambridge Edition of the Works of Immanuel Kant in English Translation, 16 vols., ed. Guyer, Paul, and Wood, Allen W. Cambridge: Cambridge University Press, 1992. Citations in the article are to individual works per abbreviations in List of major works below.

- Theoretical Philosophy, 1755–1770. Ed. and trans. David Walford with Ralf Meerbote. Cambridge: Cambridge University Press, 1992.
- Lectures on Logic. Ed. and trans. J. Michael Young. Cambridge: Cambridge University Press, 1992.
- Opus postumum. Ed. Eckart Förster, trans. Eckart Förster and Michael Rosen. Cambridge: Cambridge University Press, 1993
- Practical Philosophy. Ed. and trans. Mary J. Gregor. Cambridge: Cambridge University Press, 1996.
- Religion and Rational Theology. Ed. and trans. Allen W. Wood and George di Giovanni. Cambridge: Cambridge University Press, 1996
- Lectures on Metaphysics. Ed. and trans. Karl Ameriks and Steve Naragon. Cambridge: Cambridge University Press, 1997.
- Lectures on Ethics. Ed. Peter Heath and J.B. Schneewind, trans. Peter Heath. Cambridge: Cambridge University Press, 1997.
- Critique of Pure Reason. Ed. Paul Guyer and Allen W. Wood, trans. Allen W. Wood. Cambridge: Cambridge University Press, 1998; revised 2025.
- Correspondence. Ed. and trans. Arnulf Zweig. Cambridge: Cambridge University Press, 1999.
- Critique of the Power of Judgment. Ed. Paul Guyer, trans. Paul Guyer and Eric Matthews. Cambridge: Cambridge University Press, 2000.
- Theoretical Philosophy after 1781. Ed. Henry Allison and Peter Heath, trans. Gary Hatfield, Michael Friedman, Henry Allison, and Peter Heath. Cambridge: Cambridge University Press, 2002.
- Notes and Fragments. Ed. Paul Guyer, trans. Curtis Bowman, Paul Guyer, and Frederick Rauscher. Cambridge: Cambridge University Press, 2005.
- Anthropology, History, and Education, Ed. Günter Zöller and Robert B. Louden. Cambridge: Cambridge University Press, 2007.
- Lectures on Anthropology, Ed. Allen W. Wood and Robert B. Louden Cambridge: Cambridge University Press, 2012.
- Natural Science, Ed. Eric Watkins. Cambridge: Cambridge University Press, 2012.
- Lectures and Drafts on Political Philosophy. Ed. Frederick Rauscher, trans. Frederick Rauscher and Kenneth R. Westphal: Cambridge University Press, 2016.

=== List of major works ===
Abbreviations used in the body of the article are boldface in brackets. Unless otherwise noted, pagination is to the critical Akademie edition, which can be found in the margins of the Cambridge translations.

- 1749: Thoughts on the True Estimation of Living Forces (Gedanken von der wahren Schätzung der lebendigen Kräfte)
- 1755: Universal Natural History and Theory of the Heavens [**UNH**] (Allgemeine Naturgeschichte und Theorie des Himmels)
- 1755: Brief Outline of Certain Meditations on Fire (Meditationum quarundam de igne succinta delineatio (master's thesis under Johann Gottfried Teske))
- 1755: A New Elucidation of the First Principles of Metaphysical Cognition (Principiorum primorum cognitionis metaphysicae nova dilucidatio (doctoral thesis)) (Note: available online at Bonner Kant-Korpus Archived 6 March 2016 at the Wayback Machine.)
- 1756: The Use in Natural Philosophy of Metaphysics Combined with Geometry, Part I: Physical Monadology [**PM**] (Metaphysicae cum geometrica iunctae usus in philosophia naturali, cuius specimen I. continet monadologiam physicam, abbreviated as Monadologia Physica (habilitation thesis as a prerequisite for an extraordinary professorship))
- 1762: The False Subtlety of the Four Syllogistic Figures (Die falsche Spitzfindigkeit der vier syllogistischen Figuren)
- 1763: The Only Possible Argument in Support of a Demonstration of the Existence of God (Der einzig mögliche Beweisgrund zu einer Demonstration des Daseins Gottes)
- 1763: Attempt to Introduce the Concept of Negative Magnitudes into Philosophy [**NQ**] (Versuch den Begriff der negativen Größen in die Weltweisheit einzuführen)
- 1764: Observations on the Feeling of the Beautiful and Sublime [**OFBS**] (Beobachtungen über das Gefühl des Schönen und Erhabenen)
- 1764: Essay on the Illness of the Head (Über die Krankheit des Kopfes)
- 1764: Inquiry Concerning the Distinctness of the Principles of Natural Theology and Morality (the Prize Essay) [**PNTM**] (Untersuchungen über die Deutlichkeit der Grundsätze der natürlichen Theologie und der Moral)
- 1766: Dreams of a Spirit-Seer [**DSS**] (Träume eines Geistersehers)
- 1768: On the Ultimate Ground of the Differentiation of Regions in Space [1768] (Von dem ersten Grunde des Unterschiedes der Gegenden im Raume)
- 1770: Dissertation on the Form and Principles of the Sensible and the Intelligible World [**ID**] (De mundi sensibilis atque intelligibilis forma et principiis [doctoral thesis])
- 1775: On the Different Races of Man (Über die verschiedenen Rassen der Menschen)
- 1781: First edition of the Critique of Pure Reason [**CPuR A**] (Kritik der reinen Vernunft)
- 1783: Prolegomena to Any Future Metaphysics [**PFM**] (Prolegomena zu einer jeden künftigen Metaphysik)
- 1784: "An Answer to the Question: What Is Enlightenment?" [**WE?**] ("Beantwortung der Frage: Was ist Aufklärung?")
- 1784: "Idea for a Universal History with a Cosmopolitan Purpose" [**UH**] ("Idee zu einer allgemeinen Geschichte in weltbürgerlicher Absicht")
- 1785: "Determination of the Concept of a Human Race" [**DCHR**] (Bestimmung des Begriffs einer Menschenrace)
- 1785: Groundwork of the Metaphysics of Morals [**G**] (Grundlegung zur Metaphysik der Sitten)
- 1786: Metaphysical Foundations of Natural Science [**MFNS**] (Metaphysische Anfangsgründe der Naturwissenschaft)
- 1786: "What Does It Mean to Orient Oneself in Thinking?" [**OT**] ("Was heißt: sich im Denken orientieren?")
- 1786: Conjectural Beginning of Human History [**CB**] (Mutmaßlicher Anfang der Menschengeschichte)
- 1787: Second edition of the Critique of Pure Reason [**CPuR B**] (Kritik der reinen Vernunft)
- 1788: Critique of Practical Reason [**CPracR**] (Kritik der praktischen Vernunft)
- 1790: Critique of Judgment [**CPJ**] (Kritik der Urteilskraft)
- 1793: Religion within the Bounds of Bare Reason [**RBMR**] (Die Religion innerhalb der Grenzen der bloßen Vernunft)
- 1793: On the Old Saw: That May be Right in Theory But It Won't Work in Practice [**TP**] (Über den Gemeinspruch: Das mag in der Theorie richtig sein, taugt aber nicht für die Praxis)
- 1795: Perpetual Peace: A Philosophical Sketch [**PP**] ("Zum ewigen Frieden")
- 1797: Metaphysics of Morals [**MM**] (Metaphysik der Sitten). First part is The Doctrine of Right, which has often been published separately as The Science of Right.
- 1798: Anthropology from a Pragmatic Point of View [**APPV**] (Anthropologie in pragmatischer Hinsicht)
- 1798: Conflict of Faculties [**CF**] (Der Streit der Fakultäten)
- 1800: Logic (Logik)
- 1803: On Pedagogy (Über Pädagogik)
- 1804: Opus Postumum [**OP**]
- 1817: Lectures on Philosophical Theology (Immanuel Kants Vorlesungen über die philosophische Religionslehre, edited by K. H. L. Pölitz) [The English edition of A. W. Wood & G. M. Clark (Cornell, 1978) is based on Pölitz' second edition, 1830, of these lectures.] (Note: As noted by Allen W. Wood in his Introduction, p. 12. Wood further speculates that the lectures themselves were delivered in the Winter of 1783–84.)

=== Collected works in German ===
Wilhelm Dilthey inaugurated the Academy edition (the Akademie-Ausgabe abbreviated as AA or Ak) of Kant's writings (Gesammelte Schriften, Königlich-Preußische Akademie der Wissenschaften, Berlin, 1902–38) in 1895, and served as its first editor. The volumes are grouped into four sections:

- I. Kant's published writings (vols. 1–9),
- II. Kant's correspondence (vols. 10–13),
- III. Kant's literary remains, or Nachlass (vols. 14–23), and
- IV. Student notes from Kant's lectures (vols. 24–29).

An electronic version is also available: Elektronische Edition der Gesammelten Werke Immanuel Kants (vols. 1–23).
