= The False Subtlety of the Four Syllogistic Figures =

Essay by Immanuel Kant

- Author: Immanuel Kant
- Original title: Die falsche Spitzfindigkeit der vier syllogistischen Figuren erwiesen
- Language: German
- Subject: Logic
- Published: 1762
- Media type: Print

The False Subtlety of the Four Syllogistic Figures Proved (German: Die falsche Spitzfindigkeit der vier syllogistischen Figuren erwiesen) is an essay published by Immanuel Kant in 1762 as a printed pamphlet.

== Summary ==
=== Section I ===
General conception of the Nature of Ratiocination [Vernunftschlüsse]

A judgment is the comparison of a subject or thing with a predicate or attribute [also called a "mark"]. The comparison is made by using the copula or linking verb "is" or its negative "is not." Therefore, a judgment is a declarative sentence, which is a categorical proposition. Example: The tiger is four-footed. A predicate can also have its own predicate. In the example, the predicate "four-footed" can, itself, have the further predicate "animal." One of these predicates is immediately and directly connected to the subject or thing. The other predicate is mediate and indirectly connected to the subject:

{"The tiger} is {a four-footed} animal."
(Subject) (Copula) {(Immediate Predicate)} {(Mediate Predicate)}

In order to have clear knowledge of the relation between a predicate and a subject, one can consider a predicate to be a mediate (or indirect [mittelbares]) predicate. Between this mediate predicate or attribute, an intermediate predicate can be placed. For example, in the judgment "the sun is luminous," a clarification is attempted by inserting the predicate "star," which then becomes an immediate predicate, intermediate between the subject "sun" and the mediate predicate "luminous":

"The sun is a star that is luminous."

Sun = subject
is = copula
Star = immediate predicate (intermediate predicate; middle term)
Luminous = remote mediate predicate

Kant calls this process ratiocination. It is the comparison of a remote, mediate predicate with a subject through the use of an intermediate predicate. The intermediate predicate is called the middle term of a rational inference. The comparison of a subject with a remote, mediate predicate occurs through three judgments:

1. Luminous is a predicate of star;
2. Star is a predicate of sun;
3. Luminous is a predicate of sun (the original judgment).

This can be stated as an affirmative ratiocination: Every star is luminous; the sun is a star; consequently the sun is luminous.

Note: Kant's examples utilized obscure subjects such as Soul, Spirit, and God and their supposed predicates. These do not facilitate easy comprehension because these subjects are not encountered in everyday experience and consequently their predicates are not evident.

=== Section II ===
Of the Supreme Rules of all Ratiocination

Kant declared that the primary, universal rule of all affirmative ratiocination is: A predicate of a predicate is a predicate of the subject.

The primary, universal rule of all negative ratiocination is: Whatever is inconsistent with the predicate of a subject is inconsistent with the subject.

Because proof is possible only through ratiocination, these rules can't be proved. Such a proof would assume the truth of these rules and would therefore be circular. However, it can be shown that these rules are the primary, universal rules of all ratiocination. This can be done by showing that other rules, that were thought to be primary, are based on these rules.

The dictum de omni is the highest principle of affirmative syllogisms. It says: Whatever is universally affirmed of a concept is also affirmed of everything contained under it. This is grounded on the rule of affirmative ratiocination. A concept that contains other concepts has been abstracted from them and is a predicate. Whatever belongs to this concept is a predicate of other predicates and therefore a predicate of the subject.

The dictum de nullo says: Whatever is denied of a concept is also denied of everything that is contained under it. The concept is a predicate that has been abstracted from the concepts that are contained under it. Whatever is inconsistent with this concept is inconsistent with the subject and therefore also with the predicates of the subject. This is based on the rule of negative ratiocination.

=== Section III ===
Of Pure and Mixed Ratiocination

If one judgment can be immediately discerned from another judgment without the use of a middle term, then the inference is not a ratiocination. A direct, non-ratiocinative inference would, for example, be: "from the proposition that all airplanes have wings, it immediately follows that whatever has no wings is not an airplane."

Pure ratiocination occurs by means of three propositions. Mixed ratiocination occurs by more than three propositions. A mixed ratiocination is still a single ratiocination. It is not compound, that is, consisting of several ratiocinations.

An example of a mixed ratiocination is:

Nothing immortal is a man,
Therefore, no man is immortal; (this is a negative conversion of the preceding premise)
Socrates is a man,
Therefore, Socrates is not immortal.

A mixed ratiocination interposes an immediate inference, resulting in more than three propositions. However, a mixed ratiocination may show only three propositions if the fourth proposition is unspoken, unexpressed, and merely thought. For example, the ratiocination

Nothing immortal is a man,
Socrates is a man,
Therefore, Socrates is not immortal

is only valid if the fourth proposition Therefore, no man is immortal is covertly thought. This unspoken proposition should be inserted after the first proposition and is merely its negative converse.

=== Section IV ===
In the so-called First Figure only Pure Ratiocinations are possible, in the remaining Figures only mixed Ratiocinations are possible.

Pattern of First Figure
Subject	Predicate
Middle Term	Major Term	Major Premise
Minor Term	Middle Term	Minor Premise
Minor Term	Major Term	Conclusion

A ratiocination is always in the first figure when it accords with the first rule of ratiocination: A predicate B of a predicate C of a subject A is a predicate of the subject A. This is a pure ratiocination. It has three propositions:

C has the predicate B,
A has the predicate C,
Therefore, A has the predicate B.

In the Second Figure only mixed Ratiocinations are possible.

Pattern of Second Figure
Subject	Predicate
Major Term	Middle Term	Major Premise
Minor Term	Middle Term	Minor Premise
Minor Term	Major Term	Conclusion

The rule of the second figure is: Whatever is inconsistent with the predicate of a subject is inconsistent with the subject. This is a mixed ratiocination because an unexpressed proposition must be added in thought in order to arrive at the conclusion. If someone says,

No B is C,
A is C,
Therefore, A is not B

Their inference is valid only if they silently interpose the immediate inference No C is B after the first premise. It is merely the negative converse of the first premise. Without it, the ratiocination is invalid.

In the Third Figure only mixed Ratiocinations are possible.

Pattern of Third Figure
Subject	Predicate
Middle Term	Major Term	Major Premise
Middle Term	Minor Term	Minor Premise
Minor Term	Major Term	Conclusion

The rule of the third figure is: Whatever belongs to or contradicts a subject, also belongs to or contradicts some things that are contained under another predicate of this subject.

An example of a syllogism of the third figure is:

All mammals are air-breathers,
All mammals are animals,
Therefore, some animals are air-breathers.

This validly follows only if an immediate inference is silently interpolated. The added inference is a conversion that uses the word "some" instead of "all."

All mammals are air-breathers,
All mammals are animals,
Hence, some animals are mammals,
Therefore, some animals are air-breathers.

In the Fourth Figure only mixed Ratiocinations are possible.

Pattern of Fourth Figure
Subject	Predicate
Major Term	Middle Term	Major Premise
Middle Term	Minor Term	Minor Premise
Minor Term	Major Term	Conclusion

Kant claimed that the fourth figure is based on the insertion of several immediate inferences that each have no middle term. The affirmative mode of this fourth figure is not possible because a conclusion cannot be derived from the premises. The negative mode of this fourth figure is possible only if each premise is immediately followed by its unexpressed, unspoken converse as an immediate inference.

In order to be valid, the negative mode ratiocination:

No stupid man is learned,
Some learned persons are pious,
Therefore, some pious persons are not stupid

must become:

No stupid man is learned,
Consequently, no learned person is stupid;
Some learned persons are pious,
Consequently, some pious persons are learned,
Therefore, some pious persons are not stupid.

=== Section V ===
The Logical Division of the Four Figures is a Mistaken Subtlety.

Legitimate conclusions can be drawn in all four figures. Only the first figure determines the conclusion by pure, unmixed reasoning. The other figures use unspoken, inserted inferences. Logic should consist of open, not covert, reasoning. It should be simple and unmixed, with no hidden inferences.

Previous logicians incorrectly considered all four figures as being simple and pure. The four figures were created by playfully changing the middle term's position. This retained the rational conclusion but increased obscurity. Time should not be wasted on the study of the three mixed ratiocinations.

=== Section VI ===
Concluding Observation.

The first figure yields a correct inference in a simple, direct manner. The other figures yield a correct inference indirectly by the addition of hidden inferences. They can be changed into the simpler first figure by changing the position of the middle term.

Kant concluded the essay with several related remarks.

Distinct and complete concepts are only possible by means of judgments and ratiocinations. A distinct concept is one which is made clear by a judgment. This occurs when something is clearly recognized as a predicate of a subject. A complete concept is one which is made distinct by a ratiocination. The ratiocination can be simple or a chain of reasoning.

The ability to understand and the ability to reason are both based on the ability to judge. Understanding is the immediate recognition that something is a predicate of a subject. Reason is the ability to judge mediately (indirectly). It recognizes another predicate in the first predicate, thus conceiving a subject indirectly by means of a remote predicate.

Higher knowledge is based on judging. Framing a judgment is a reflection that results in a distinct concept. Non-human animals can have clear representations of things that are predicates of a subject. Humans can also have knowledge that a predicate is a predicate of a subject and are therefore able to make a judgment. Non-human animals can distinguish things from one another. The different ideas are the causes of their actions, which are irrational. Humans can logically distinguish between things by means of judgment. The higher knowledge of a human is based on the ability to make our own ideas the object of our thoughts.

All affirmative judgments are based on the principle of Identity. A subject is identical to its predicate. All negative judgments have the principle of Contradiction as their foundation. A subject is opposed to its predicate. Judgments in which identity or contradiction is mediately known, by means of intermediate predicates and by means of the analysis of concepts, are provable. Judgments in which identity or contradiction is immediately known cannot be proved (See Section II). These unprovable judgments precede definitions because one must recognize a subject's predicate before they can define the subject.

== Reference in the Critique of Pure Reason ==
Kant summed up his thoughts on this topic in a short footnote that appeared in the second edition of the Critique of Pure Reason, B141. He had been discussing the definition of judgment in general. Logicians had usually defined it as a relation between two concepts. Kant disagreed because, he claimed, only categorical judgments are so defined. Hypothetical and disjunctive judgments are a relation between two judgments.

In his footnote, Kant asserted that the lengthy and detailed doctrine of the four syllogistic figures concerned only categorical syllogisms or inferences. He stated that this doctrine is only an artifice or trick for giving the appearance that there are three more kinds of inference or modes of drawing a conclusion than that of the first figure. This is done surreptitiously by secretly concealing immediate inferences in the premises of a pure syllogism. The only reason that this was generally accepted, Kant remarked, was that the logicians had made people believe that all of the other kinds of judgments could be reduced to being categorical judgments. Kant claimed to have disproved this in his Critique, A 73. There he argued that a categorical judgment relates two concepts, whereas a hypothetical or disjunctive judgment relates two judgments.

== See also ==
- Square of opposition
