= Johann Gottfried Teske =

German physicist and philosopher (1704–1772)

- Born: 3 May 1704; Königsberg, Prussia
- Died: 25 May 1772; Königsberg, Prussia

Education
- Education: University of Königsberg; University of Halle

Philosophical work
- Era: 18th-century philosophy
- Region: Western philosophy
- School: Enlightenment philosophy Rationalism
- Institutions: University of Königsberg
- Notable students: Immanuel Kant; Martin Knutzen

Johann Gottfried Teske (German: [ˈtɛskə]; 3 May 1704 – 25 May 1772) was a German physicist and philosopher who is best known for his collaboration with Immanuel Kant on his work De Igne.

== Life ==
Teske studied from 1719 at the University of Königsberg. He later moved to the University of Halle, where on 27 May 1726 he acquired a master's degree. He returned to the University of Königsberg on 10 August 1726, where he became a lecturer of philosophy. In 1728, he became an associate professor of logic and metaphysics and, in 1729, a full professor of physics. In 1733, he was appointed to the Samland Consistory. He also became vice president and official at the Consistory.

In 1760, he received an honorary professorship at the University of St. Petersburg as an honorary member of the Russian Academy of Sciences. Teske's most famous pupil was Immanuel Kant, whom he supervised as a mentor in acquiring a master's degree and assisted in his work De Igne (On Fire). Teske, who was the first physicist at the University of Königsberg, was involved in the study of electricity. He also participated in the organizational tasks of Königsberg University. He was dean of the Faculty of Philosophy and, in the summer of 1772, became rector of the university.

== Works ==
- Diss. de longitudine fixarum mutabili, latitudine immutabili. Königsberg.
- Diss. de intellectu divino. Königsberg.
- Diss. de igne ex chalybis silicisque collisione nascente. Königsberg.
- Diss. de origine fontium. Königsberg.
- Diss. de incomprehensibilitate Dei. Königsberg 1743.
- Abhandlung von Electricität. Berlin 1745.
- Neue Entdeckung verschiedener bisher noch unbekannter Wirkungen und Eigenschaften der Electricität. Königsberg 1746.
- Diss. de phialis vitreis ab illabente minimo silice dissilientibus. Königsberg 1751.
- Neue Versuche in Curirung der Zahnschmerzen, vermittelst des magnetischen Stahls. Königsberg 1765.
- Anmerkung und Betrachtung über die ungewöhnliche Kälte im J. 1740 – in den Königsberger Intelligenzblätter
