= Metaphysical Foundations of Natural Science =

1786 book by Immanuel Kant

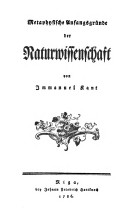
- Author: Immanuel Kant
- Original title: Metaphysische Anfangsgründe der Naturwissenschaft
- Language: German
- Subject: Philosophy
- Published: 1786
- Publication place: Germany
- Media type: Print

Metaphysical Foundations of Natural Science (German: Metaphysische Anfangsgründe der Naturwissenschaft) is a 1786 book by the philosopher Immanuel Kant.

== Summary ==
The book is divided into four chapters. The chapters are concerned with the metaphysical foundations of phoronomy (now called kinematics), dynamics, mechanics, and phenomenology.

== Reception ==
Kant's book was a basic influence on the rise of science departments of the universities in the German-speaking countries in the nineteenth century.

Hans Christian Ørsted wrote "Differential and integral calculus consist of nothing but .. thought experiments and considerations of them. ... In his Metaphysical Foundations of Natural Science, Kant has given us the most beautiful examples of this kind of presentation, without, however, drawing attention to it himself."

Kurt Gödel was influenced by Metaphysische Anfangsgründe der Naturwissenschaft. Gödel studied it while a member of the Vienna Circle.
