= Collegium Fridericianum =

Coordinates: 54°42′48″N 20°31′34″E

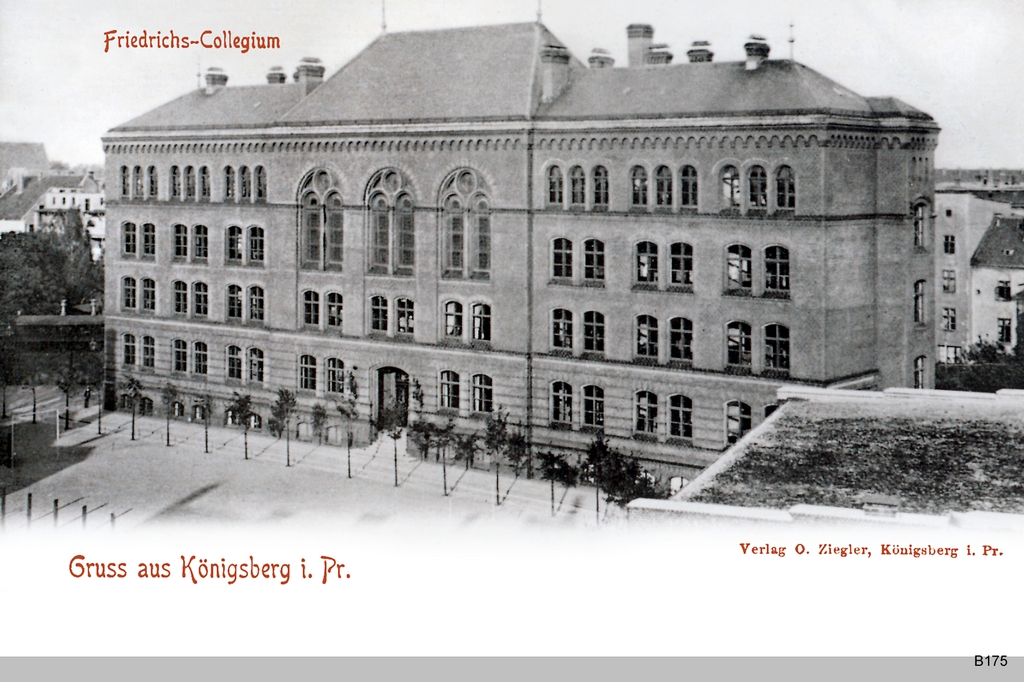
- Collegium Fridericianum
- Königsberg; Germany

Information
- Type: Gymnasium
- Established: 16 August 1698
- Closed: 1944

The Collegium Fridericianum (also known as the Friedrichskolleg, Friedrichskollegium, and Friedrichs-Kollegium) was a prestigious gymnasium in Königsberg, Prussia. Alumni were known as Friderizianer.

== History ==
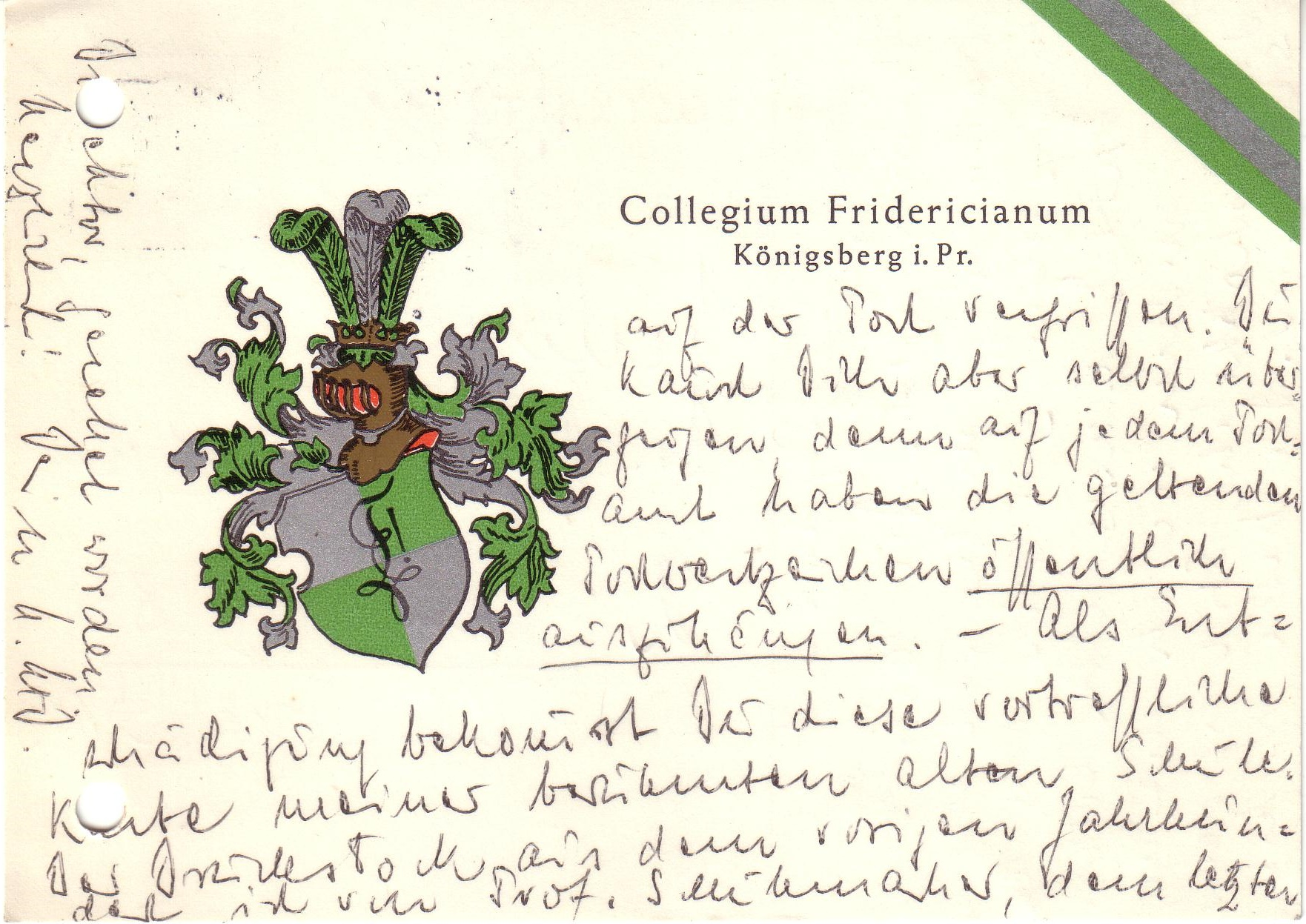
Postcard c. 1930

=== 18th century ===
Using the Francke school of Halle (Saale) as a model, Theodor Gehr (died 1705), an official of Brandenburg-Prussia, founded a Pietist private school in Sackheim on 11 August 1698. It became a royal school of Frederick I, King in Prussia, on 4 March 1701. For 16,000 guilder in 1703, it acquired the hall of Obermarschall von Creytzen on Collegiengasse in eastern Löbenicht and was designated the Collegium Fridericianum or Friedrichskolleg in honor of Frederick on 10 May. The Pietist school was the first in Königsberg not to be affiliated with a parish church. The school's first director in 1702 was Heinrich Lysius (1670-1731) of Flensburg, pastor of Löbenicht Church. The school received an organ built by Johann Josua Mosengel in 1707.

The Collegium was admired by King Frederick William I of Prussia; in a decree on 25 October 1735 the king mentioned the school as an example for other schools in Prussia. Over 50 Baltic German students went to the school before attending university in the 18th century. Immanuel Kant began attending the school in 1732, while Johann Gottfried Herder taught there from 1763 to 1764. The school consisted of a Latin school, a German school, and a boarding school often used by foreign students. It also contained a wooden tower utilized as an observatory and a small church in service until 1853.

=== 19th century ===
The Collegium was elevated to a gymnasium on 4 September 1810, the first in Prussia, under the direction of Friedrich August Gotthold. The school had three teachers and eighteen Abitur students volunteer during the War of the Sixth Coalition in 1813, with ten dying during the fighting, including three at Großgörschen. Eight representatives of the 1848 Frankfurt Parliament were Friderizianer: Eduard von Simson, Georg Bernhard Simson, Friedrich Wilhelm Schubert, Ludwig Wilhelm zu Dohna-Lauck, Johann August Muttray, Gustav von Saltzwedel, Anton von Wegnern, and Johann Jacoby.

The gymnasium's building was dismantled and rebuilt in 1853, with the new structure dedicated on 17 October 1855. In 1858 the 36,000 volume library of Director Friedrich August Gotthold was donated to the Royal and University Library. The gymnasium counted 508 students in 1865. During the Franco-Prussian War the school's volunteers included two teachers and nine students, all of whom survived the war.

In 1890 the Prussian government acquired the property of the stately Groß Jägerhof on Jägerhofstraße between Königstraße and Vorder-Roßgarten. The school moved into this new property, which was remodeled by Ernst von Ihne and dedicated in 1893. The Collegium's former location on Collegiengasse was later used by the Burgschule. The teacher Gustav Zippel began a history of the Friedrichskollegium to commemorate its bicentennial in 1898.

=== 20th century ===
In 1901 the Friedrichskollegium consisted of 32 teachers and 845 students; it was the largest school in Königsberg prior to World War I. By 1902 its faculty library consisted of 9,000 volumes and its student library had 1,200 volumes. Upon the outbreak of war in 1914, 20 teachers and 139 students volunteered for service, with hundreds following during the course of the war. Casualties included three teachers and fifty students.

The gymnasium was destroyed during the 1944 Bombing of Königsberg in World War II, with interim classes ceasing in January 1945. At least 160 representatives of the school had been killed during the war or in its aftermath by 1948. The Landfermann-Gymnasium of Duisburg has sponsored the traditions of the former Friedrichskollegium through several endowments since 28 May 1955.

== Notable people ==
=== Directors ===
- Heinrich Lysius (1670-1731), from 1702 to 1731
- Georg Friedrich Rogall (1701-1733), from 1731 to 1733
- Franz Albert Schultz (1692-1763), from 1733 to 1763
- Friedrich August Gotthold (1778-1858), from 1810 to 1852
- Johannes Horkel (1820-1861), from 1852 to 1860
- Theodor Adler, from 1861 to 1863
- Gustav Heinrich Wagner (1820–1878), from 1863
- Albert Lehnerdt (1827–1897)
- Georg Ellendt (1840–1908), from 1891 to 1908
- Paul Glogau, from 1908 to 1913
- Alfred Rausch (1858-1939), from 1913 to 1923
- Bruno Schumacher (1879-1957), from 1934 to 1945

=== Teachers ===
- Friedrich Wilhelm Barthold (1799-1858), historian
- Johann Wilhelm Ebel (1784-1861), theologian
- Xaver von Hasenkamp (1826-1911), editor of the Königsberger Hartungsche Zeitung
- Johann Gottfried Herder (1744-1803), philosopher
- Heinrich Otto Hoffmann (1816-1893), mathematician
- Karl Lachmann (1793-1851), philologist
- Karl Marold (1850-1909), Germanist
- Krzysztof Celestyn Mrongovius (1764-1855), translator
- Otto Schöndorffer (1887-1926), philologist
- Ernst Gustav Zaddach (1817-1880), zoologist
- Hugo Albert Nehrenheim, teacher

=== Students ===
- Paul Adloff (1870-1944), dentist and anthropologist
- Adolf von Batocki (1868-1944), Governor of East Prussia
- Hermann Bobrik (1814-1845), historian and geographer
- Karl Böttcher (1838-1900), philologist and director of the Burgschule
- Franz Brandstäter (1815-1883), philologist
- Friedrich Reinhold Dietz (1805-1836), philologist
- Friedrich Dewischeit (1805-1884), poet
- Ludwig Wilhelm zu Dohna-Lauck (1805-1895), politician
- Traugott Fedtke (1909-1988), organist and composer
- Fritz Gause (1893-1973), historian
- Klaus von der Groeben (1902-2002), jurist
- Karl Haffner (1804-1876), dramatist
- Theophil Herbst (1806-1868), philologist
- David Hilbert (1862-1943), mathematician
- Hermann Theodor Hoffmann (1836-1902), lord mayor of Königsberg from 1893 to 1902
- Johann Jacoby (1805-1877), politician
- Immanuel Kant (1724-1804), philosopher
- Friedrich Julius Kieschke (1819-1895), lord mayor of Königsberg from 1867 to 1872
- Gustav Kordgien (1838-1907), professor
- Hans Kramer (1896-1982), forester
- Georg David Kypke (1724-1779), Orientalist
- Georg Lejeune-Dirichlet (1858-1920), pedagogue
- August Lilienthal (1814-1852), philologist
- Hugo Linck (1890-1976), pastor in Königsberg until 1948
- Fritz Albert Lipmann (1899-1986), biochemist and Nobel Prize recipient
- Hans Lullies (1898-1982), physiologist
- Daniel Gotthilf Moldenhawer (1753-1823), philologist
- Johann Heinrich Daniel Moldenhawer (1709-1790), theologian
- Ernst Mollmann (1850-1939), philologist
- Herbert Meinhard Mühlpfordt (1893-1902), historian
- Bernhard Mrowka (1907-1973), physicist
- Johann August Muttray (1808-1872), physician
- Ludwig Passarge (1825-1912), writer
- Siegfried Passarge (1866-1958), geographer
- Reinhold Rehs (1901-1971), politician
- Albert Reusch (1816-1892), philologist
- David Ruhnken (1723-1798), classicist
- Johann Georg Rosenhain (1816-1887), mathematician
- Otto Saro (1818-1888), prosecutor and politician
- Gustav von Saltzwedel (1808-1897), politician
- Dietrich von Saucken (1892–1980), general
- Alexander Schmidt (1816-1887), philologist
- Friedrich Ludwig Schröder (1744-1816), actor
- Friedrich Wilhelm Schubert (1799-1868), historian
- Eduard von Simson (1810-1899), politician
- Georg Bernhard Simson (1817-1897), politician
- Siegfried Thomaschki (1894-1967), artillery general
- Siegfried von der Trenck (1882-1951), writer
- Ernst Wilhelm Wagner (1857-1927), director of the Wilhelmsgymnasium
- Anton von Wegnern (1809-1891), politician
- Albert Zweck (1857-1934), geographer
