= 1560 in art =

List of years in art	(table)
- … 1550; 1551; 1552; 1553; 1554; 1555; 1556; 1557; 1558; 1559; 1560; 1561; 1562; 1563; 1564; 1565; 1566; 1567; 1568; 1569; 1570 …
- Art; Archaeology; Architecture; Literature; Music; Philosophy; Science; +...

Events from the year 1560 in art.

== Events ==
- Giorgio Vasari begins work on the Uffizi in Florence for Cosimo I de' Medici as offices for the Florentine magistrates.

== Works ==
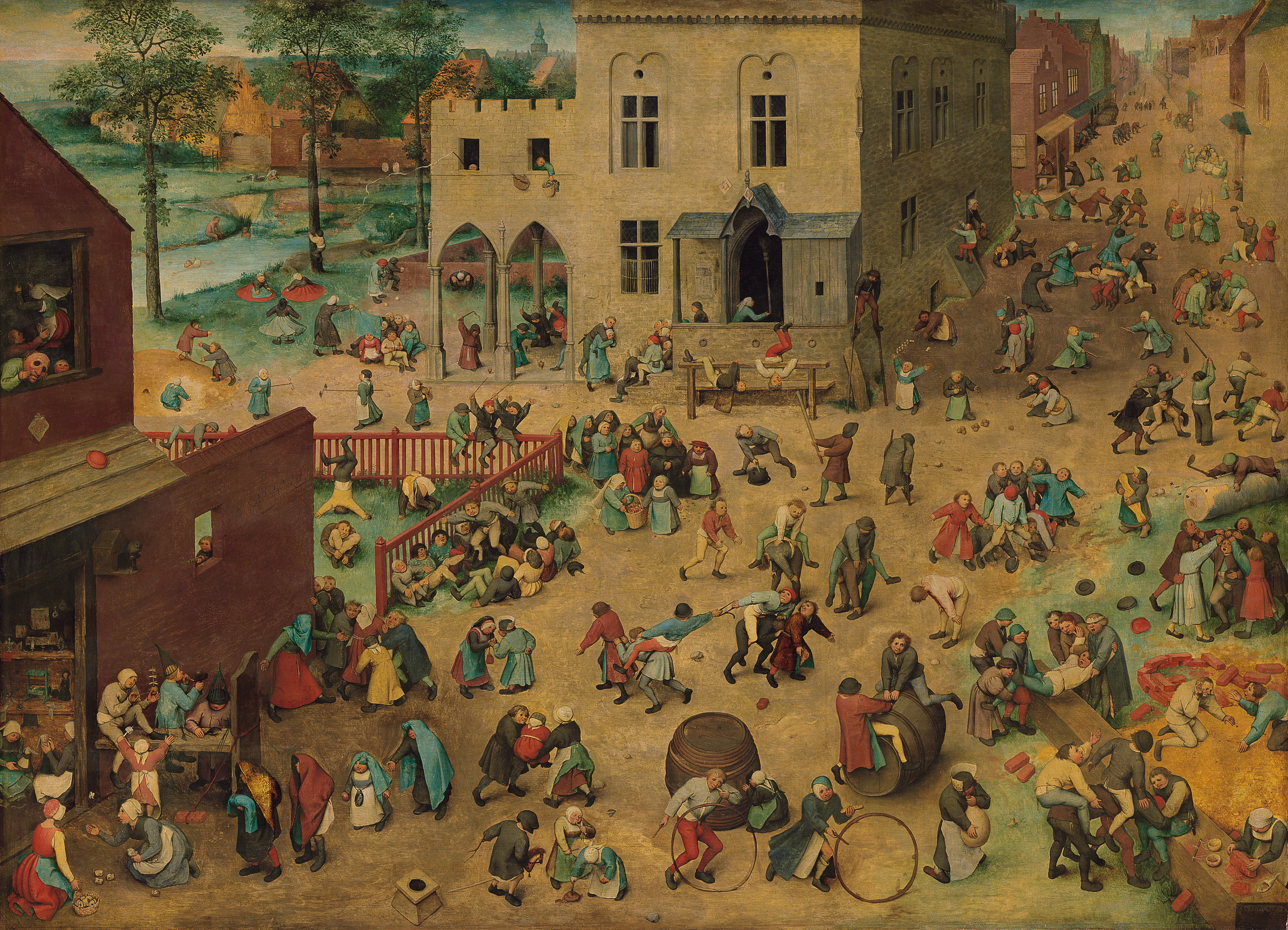
Bruegel – Children's Games

- Pieter Bruegel the Elder – Children's Games
- Valerio Cioli - Fontana del Bacchino at the Boboli Gardens in Florence
- Juan de Juanes – The Last Supper
- Maso da San Friano – Visitation (altarpiece)
- Antonis Mor – Portrait of the artist Jan van Scorel
- Steven van der Meulen – Elizabeth Clinton
- Karel van Mander – Prince Christian of Denmark

== Births ==
- June 25 – Juan Sánchez Cotán, Spanish painter (died 1626)
- November 3 – Annibale Carracci, Italian painter (died 1609)
- date unknown
  - Giovanni Balducci, also called Il Cosci, Italian mannerist painter (died 1600)
  - Bartolomeo Carducci, Italian painter (died 1608)
  - Wenceslas Cobergher, Flemish Renaissance architect, engineer, painter, antiquarian, numismatist and economist (died 1634)
  - Adriaen Collaert, Flemish engraver (died 1618)
  - Dominicus Custos, Flemish printer and copperplate engraver (died 1612)
  - Bartholomeus Dolendo, Dutch engraver (died unknown)
  - Giovanni Niccolo, Italian Jesuit painter (died 1626)
  - Diego Polo the Elder, Spanish painter (died 1600)
  - Claudio Ridolfi, Italian painter (died 1644)
  - Daniel Soreau, German still life painter (died 1619)
  - Antonio Viviani, Italian painter of frescoes (died 1620)
- probable
  - Ludovico Buti, Italian painter active mostly in Florence (died 1611)
  - Baldassare d'Anna, Italian painter of the late-Renaissance period (died 1639)
  - Paolo Camillo Landriani, Italian painter (died 1618)
  - Arent Passer, stonemason and architect (died 1637)
  - Marietta Robusti, Venetian painter of the Renaissance period (died 1590)
  - Fabrizio Santafede, Italian late-Mannerist painter (died 1635)
  - Domenico Tintoretto, Venetian painter, son of Jacopo Tintoretto (died 1635)
  - 1560/1561: Rafael Sadeler I, Flemish engraver of the Sadeler family (died 1628/1632)

== Deaths ==
- February 7 – Bartolommeo Bandinelli, Florentine sculptor (born 1493)
- date unknown
  - Antonio Badile, Italian painter from Verona (born 1518)
  - Giovanni Battista Caporali, Italian painter (born c.1476)
  - Francesco Vecellio, Venetian painter of the early Renaissance (born 1485), best known as the elder brother of the painter Titian.
- probable
  - Hans Sebald Lautensack, German painter and etcher (born 1524)
  - Herri met de Bles, Flemish Mannerist landscape painter (born c.1510)
  - Frans Mostaert, Flemish landscape painter (born 1428)
  - Heinrich Zell, German printer and cartographer (born unknown)
