= Königsberg State and University Library =

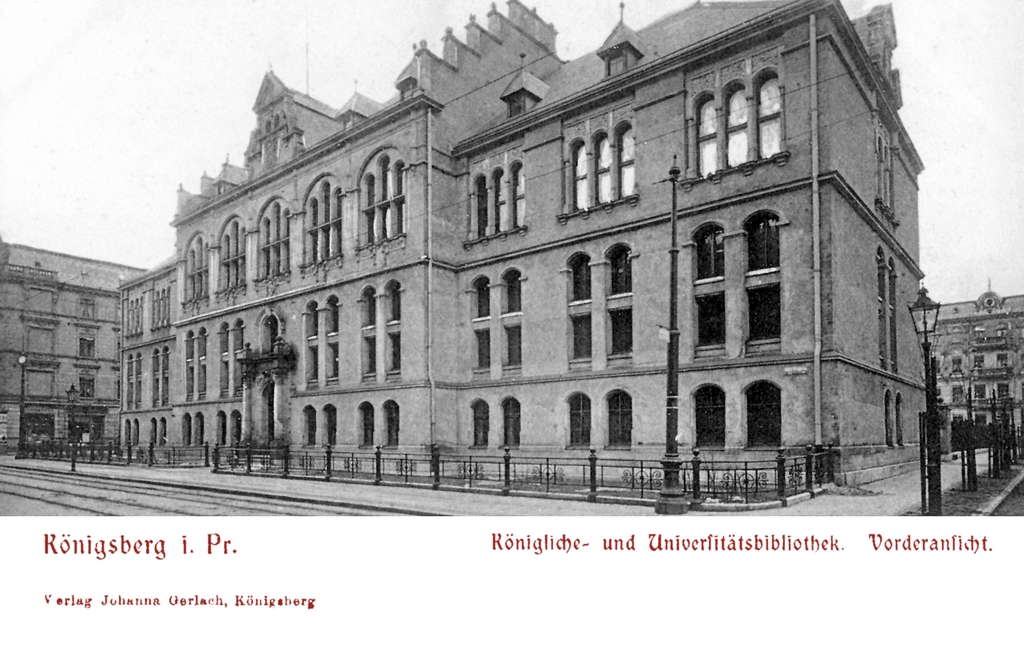
The Royal and University Library in Mitteltragheim, c. 1901

The Königsberg State and University Library (German: Staats- und Universitätsbibliothek Königsberg) was a combined state library and academic library in Königsberg, East Prussia, Germany. It was one of the most prestigious libraries of the eastern German Sprachraum, comparable only to the Breslau University Library in Breslau in Silesia of then southeastern Germany (now Wrocław in Poland). Königsberg University's developed since the 16th century out of several smaller libraries. It was destroyed in 1944 during World War II in the invasion by the Soviet Union after which the city was occupied and renamed Kaliningrad.

== History ==
=== Chamber Library ===
Albert, Duke of Prussia (1490–1568), founded the Chamber Library (Kammerbibliothek) or German Library (Deutsche Bibliothek) above the gate of Königsberg Castle in c. 1526 with about 100 smaller works. Its first director was the ducal secretary Balthasar Gans. Because Albert only had rudimentary knowledge of the Latin language, the collection contained German books and German language translations of foreign texts. Its authors were among the most influential of the Protestant Reformation of the 15th century, including Martin Luther, Lazarus Spengler, Martin Bucer, Johann von Staupitz, Andreas Karlstadt, Wenzeslaus Linck, Johannes Oecolampadius, and Urbanus Rhegius. Other volumes included legal, historical, geographical, and medical topics. By the end of Albert's life, the ducal Chamber Library had expanded to 500 volumes. The Chamber Library was passed to the Castle Library in 1583.

=== Silver Library ===
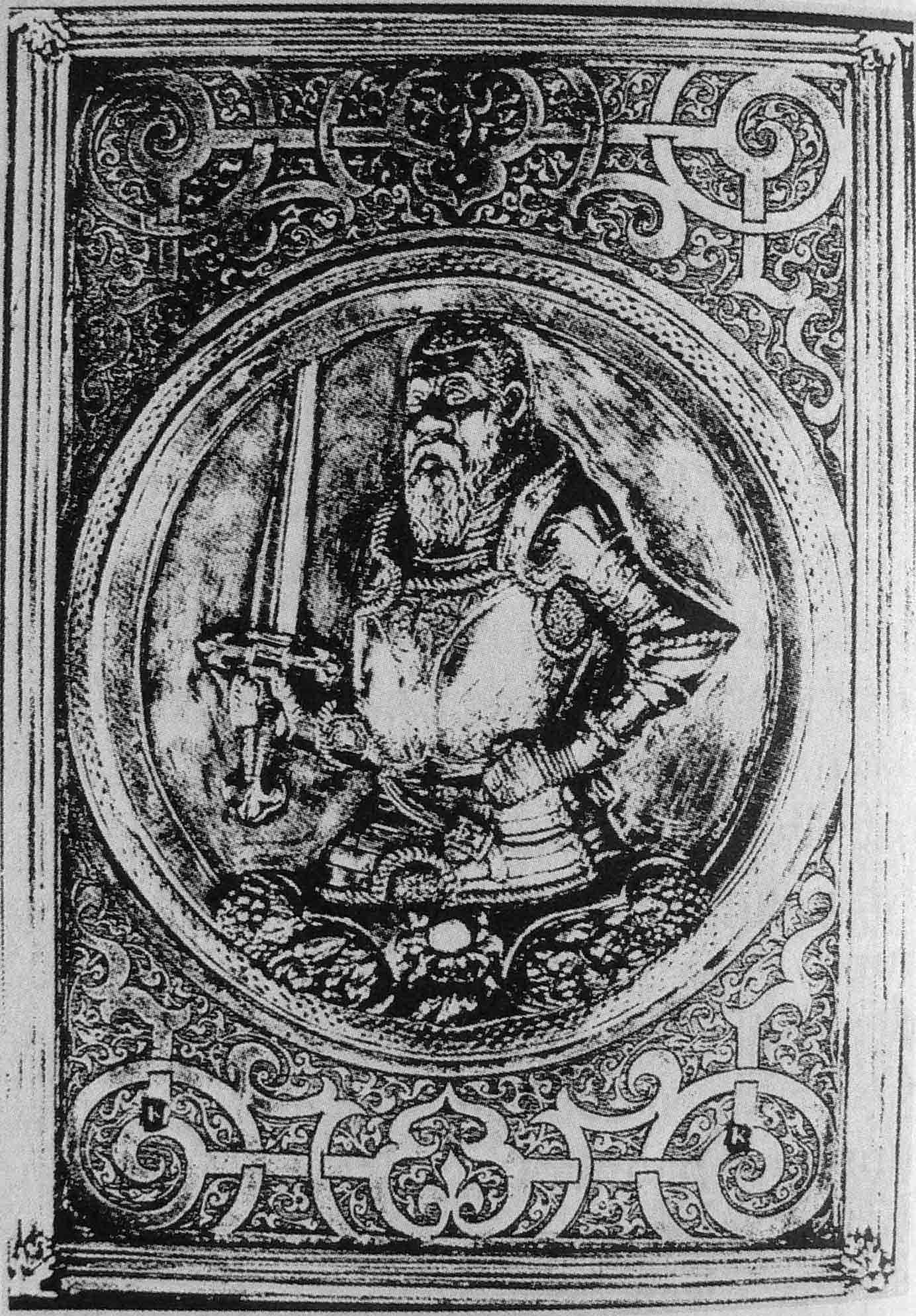
Depiction of Duke Albert of Prussia (1490–1568) on a silver cover

The most cherished part of the Chamber Library was the Silver Library (Silberbibliothek). Initially only two of Albert's volumes were bound with plates of embossed silver by silversmiths, but it expanded to twenty after the duke's second marriage in 1550 to Anna Marie of Brunswick-Lüneburg. Besides the splendid Lutheran Bible by Cornelius Vorwend of Nuremberg, there were also three works by Paul Hoffmann, six by Gerhard Lenz, and five by Hieronymus Kösler, the latter three all being from Königsberg.

On 20 August 1611 the Silver Library passed to the directors of the Castle Library. It was temporarily evacuated to Küstrin during the Seven Years' War (1756–1763), to Memel (later renamed Klaipėda) during the War of the Fourth Coalition (1806–1807) in the world-wide Napoleonic Wars (1803–1815), and to Berlin during World War I (1914–1918). Since 1924, it was exhibited as part of the Teutonic Knights museum within Königsberg Castle. It was moved to the manor in Karwinden during World War II (1939–1945) but was lost amidst the battle damage of the war on the Eastern Front with the invasion by the Soviet Union.

=== Castle Library ===
Encouraged by the influx of educated persons to Königsberg, Albert established for academics the Castle Library (Schloßbibliothek) or New Library (Neue Bibliothek, Bibliotheca nova), the core of the later State Library, alongside his private Chamber Library in 1529. Crotus Rubeanus of Thuringia gathered 63 mostly Latin and Greek volumes from 70 authors. It grew in size to require a librarian, the efficient Felix König (Rex) of Ghent, also known as Polyphemus, who instituted systematic and alphabetical catalogs. The date of Polyphemus's start, 5 December 1534, has been regarded as the informal beginning of the library.

Albert made the Castle Library public in 1540, an act celebrated by theologians and humanists and praised by Wilhelm Gnapheus in Latin poetry. At that time it contained 1,600 titles in 800 volumes. Writing in the Königsberger Allgemeine Zeitung, Karl Lohmeyer considered the Königsberg Castle Library to be the first public library in Europe, older than the Bodleian Library which opened publicly in 1602. Between 1541 and 1543 the Castle Library also acquired the Ordensbibliothek, the library of the Teutonic Knights previously located in Tapiau. By the time of Polyphemus's death in 1549, the Castle Library counted 2,400 works in 1,200 volumes.

The immediate successors of Polyphemus were Martin Chemnitz of Treuenbrietzen (worked 1550–53) and David Milesius of Neisse. The Castle Library flourished through the leadership of Heinrich Zell (worked 1557–64), who added 1,000 volumes and reorganized it. It was possibly by a suggestion of Zell that Albert decreed in 1557 that a copy of all books printed in Prussia be included within the Castle Library; legal deposit continued until 1945. Successors of Zell were Johann Steinbach (worked 1564–66), Michael Scrinius of Danzig (worked 1566–85), and Matthias Menius of Danzig.

The Castle Library acquired the Chamber Library in 1583 and the Silver Library in 1611. Under the leadership of Menius in c. 1600, the Schlossbibliothek acquired 204 legal volumes and 196 theological volumes. It began to stagnate in 1618 after the inheritance of the Duchy of Prussia by the Margraviate of Brandenburg, however; the Hohenzollern rulers focused on developing the libraries of Berlin instead of Königsberg. From 1621 to 1658 only 343 volumes were added to the latter. At the end of the 17th century it acquired the collection of Bogusław Radziwiłł.

=== Wallenrodt Library ===
The Wallenrodt Library (Wallenrodtsche Bibliothek) of Königsberg Cathedral was established by the 17th century ducal chancellor Martin von Wallenrodt (1570–1632), whose first collection of 3,000 volumes was destroyed by fire in 1623. Martin began a second collection which reached 2,000 volumes by his death and was then continued by his son, Johann Ernst von Wallenrodt (1632–1696), who added another 1,000 volumes. Ernst von Wallenrodt (1651–1735) donated 2,000 more volumes in 1718.

Librarians included the professor Christian Heinrich Gütther (worked 1738–55), Johann Heinrich Daniel Moldenhawer (worked 1756–63), Carl Andreas Christiani (worked 1763–80), law professor Wilhelm Bernhard Jester (worked 1780–85), and Georg Ernst Sigismund Hennig. Rudolf Reicke counted 10,334 volumes, including 200 manuscripts and 85 incunabula.

The Wallenrodt Library was incorporated into the State and University Library in 1909, with 7,000 volumes taken by the Mitteltragheim facility and 3,500 volumes remaining in Königsberg Cathedral. The latter were destroyed by the August 1944 bombing of Königsberg in World War II.

=== University Library ===
The University Library (Universitätsbibliothek) was established in 1544 as a small academic library for the Albertina, the new University of Königsberg. However, it was for long overshadowed by the Chamber and Castle Libraries. It began to expand during the Age of Enlightenment through private efforts, rather than state support. Michael Lilienthal (1686–1750) was a librarian at the start of the 18th century, while during the administration of Martin Sylvester Grabe the Younger (1674–1727) it acquired 800 volumes. The theologian librarians Johannes Behm (lived 1687–1753) and Friedrich Samuel Bock (1716–1785) added 1,744 and 2,469 volumes, respectively. From 1765 to 1772 Immanuel Kant served as an assistant librarian. The physicist Karl Daniel Reusch was librarian from 1779 to 1806. The University Library often received donations, such as the 3,000 volume and coin collection of the mathematician David Bläsing (1660–1719), the substantial collection of Professor Cölestin Kowalewski (1700–1771), part of the theologian Georg Christoph Pisanski's estate, and a donation from the Tilsit merchant Johann Daniel Gordack in 1790.

The University Library of that era was detrimentally located in two rooms within Königsberg Castle between the Schlosskirche and a tower. The library was only open two days a week for three hours, and was not open at all during the winter of 1772/73 because Bock did not want to work during the cold. By the end of Bock's service in 1779, the library's collection of manuscripts and incunabula had expanded to 14,000. The University Library received the collection of the Etatsministerium in 1805, as that government ministry had been dissolved the previous year. The library also acquired the collection of the Deutsche Gesellschaft.

Georg Heinrich Ludwig Nicolovius was only librarian from 1807 to 1809, but his effective administration acquired 2,832 volumes, more than Reusch had managed over a much longer time. The history collection was predominant, followed by theology and philology. German and European classics first began to appear during the stewardship of Nicolovius.

=== 19th century ===
In 1810 during the era of Prussian reforms, several of the city's collections, including the Castle Library, University Library, Public Library, and Keyserling Library, moved to the Königshaus, a royal palace built for King Frederick William I in 1731 in Neue Sorge. The Castle Library thus became the Royal Library (Königliche Bibliothek) on 21 February 1810 and was administered by a university curatorship. The royal and university libraries were united as the Royal and University Library (Königliche- und Universitätsbibliothek) in 1827. The Keyserling Library moved to Rautenberg in 1821, while the Public Library moved to Kneiphof in 1875.

The library counted amongst its donations the personal collection of Johann Friedrich Herbart (1776–1841). In 1858 the bibliophile Friedrich August Gotthold (1839–1880), director of the Collegium Fridericianum, donated his personal collection of 36,000 volumes to the library. Gotthold's collection included belles-lettres, classical philology, pedagogy, history, geography, and music since the Renaissance. In 1860 it received the collection of its chief librarian, Christian August Lobeck (1781–1860).

In 1890 the Royal and University Library counted 263,636 volumes. Collections and Nachlässe acquired around the turn of the century included Friedrich Zanders (1811–1894), Gustav Hirschfeld (1847–1895), Jakob Caro (1835–1904), and August Hagen (1834–1910). The Nachlass of the philosopher Johann Georg Hamann (1730–1788), the Magus of the North, was added in 1905.

=== 20th century ===
The Royal and University Library moved from Neue Sorge to Tragheim in 1901. The new institution was built in Mitteltragheim in place of the Baroque Braxein-Tettau Palace once owned by the apothecary and councilor August Wilhelm Hensche. The adjoining road Henschestraße was named in his honor. Librarians included Fritz Milkau and Ernst Kuhnert. In 1909 it added the Wallenrodt Library, the preeminent noble and civil service collection of the province.

The institution became the State and University Library (Staats- und Universitätsbibliothek) after the abdication of the House of Hohenzollern in 1918. Kuhnert published a history of the library in 1926. Other collections affiliated with the united library were that of Königsberg Observatory and the Handbibliothek for use by students.

In 1939 the State and University Library contained 685,000 volumes. At the start of 1944 many of the library's most valued collections were evacuated to nearby palaces and manors. The library itself was destroyed during the August 1944 Bombing of Königsberg in World War II. Surviving texts were subsequently acquired by Soviet and Polish experts and institutions.

Remnants of the State and University Library can be found within, among others:

- Germany: Prussian Privy State Archives in Berlin
- Lithuania: Vilnius University Library and Martynas Mažvydas National Library of Lithuania in Vilnius;
- Poland: Nicolaus Copernicus University Library in Toruń; Hosianum in Olsztyn
- Russia: Immanuel Kant Baltic Federal University in Kaliningrad; Russian State Library, State Public Historical Library, Library For Foreign Literature, and INION in Moscow; Novosibirsk; Library of the Russian Academy of Sciences in Saint Petersburg; Voronezh State University Library in Voronezh.
