= Muckers =

Muckers (German: Muckern, i.e. canting bigots, hypocrites) is the nickname given to the followers of the teaching of Johann Heinrich Schönherr (1770–1826) and Johann Wilhelm Ebel (1784–1861). The word originates in the Middle German word muckern, which was used also to denote the clearing of stalls and stables. In some areas of Germany, the word was spelled muggeln.

== History ==
Schönherr, the son of a non-commissioned officer at Memel in Prussia, was educated at the university of Königsberg, where at that time the theological faculty, under the influence of Kantian idealism, was strongly rationalist in tendency. The lad, who was miserably poor, was dissatisfied with a philosophy which stopped short of an explanation of the "thing in itself", and, having been reared in the strictest Lutheran orthodoxy, set to work to develop, with the aid of the Bible, a philosophy of his own. In the end he believed himself to have reached ultimate knowledge, and became the prophet of a dualistic theosophy so closely analogous to Gnosticism that it might have been taken for a deliberate revival, had not Schönherr's lack of study in such theology precluded any such idea.

Among his converts was Ebel, who from 1810 onwards gained a great reputation in Königsberg as an earnest preacher of the orthodox doctrines of "sin, grace and redemption, and in 1816 was appointed "archdeacon," i.e. principal pastor, at the Altstadt Church in Königsberg. In the pulpit he was orthodox; but he gathered about him a select circle of the initiated, to whom in private he taught Schönherr's doctrines. Schönherr himself sank into the background, and eventually died in 1826. But Ebel continued his teaching, and was joined in 1827 by Heinrich Diestel, also a Lutheran pastor of Königsberg. They became father confessors to a wide circle of fashionable people in the Prussian capital. In view of their peculiar teaching as to "the purification of the flesh," which involved the minute regulation of the intercourse of married people, scandal was inevitable. Matters came to a head in 1835, when Count Finckenstein, himself formerly an initiate, denounced the two pastors and accused them of immorality.

Diestel wrote two tirades against the count, who brought a successful action for slander. The group itself was dissolved in 1839. The evidence taken in the case was then laid before the old-Prussian Königsberg consistory, and proceedings followed which became famous as the Königsberger Religionsprozess (1835–1841), ending in sentences of deprivation on both Ebel and Diestel. The charges of actual immorality were dismissed; but there is no doubt that some of their followers established practices akin to those of the Agapemone and the Perfectionists. Some of them migrated to Brazil, where in 1874 at Porto Alegre a company of them came into collision with the military (see Revolt of the Muckers).

== Popular culture ==
In Brazil the Muckers are remembered in popular culture. For example in 1993, when there were number of murders near São Leopoldo; the local newspaper Zero Hora ran a headline "Violence is Resurrected in the Land of the Muckers".

In the late 20th and early 21st centuries, two films were made in Brazil about Jacobina Mentz Maurer, one of the leaders of the Muckers Brazilian rebellion. The better known of the two films was made by Fábio Barreto in 2002 and is called A Paixão de Jacobina (Jacobina's Passion).
