= Reicke =

Reicke is a surname. Notable people with the surname include:

- Bo Reicke (1914 – 1987), Swedish biblical scholar
- Georg Reicke (1863-1923), German politician, Second mayor of Berlin from 1903-1920
- Ilse Reicke (1893-1989), German writer, journalist and feminist
- Rudolf Reicke (1825—1905), German historian and scholar
