= Ambrosius Schupp =

Brazilian writer (1840–1914)

Ambrosius Schupp also Ambrósio Schupp or Ambros Schupp (his full original German name still needs to be added here) (1840–1914) was a German-Brazilian Catholic priest, educator and author.

Schupp was born at Montabaur. As a highly educated German immigrant to Brazil, amongst his priestly activities, he authored many books, like:

- A evolução e o homem, 1909
- As cobras do Rio Grande do Sul, 1913
- Fenômenos luminosos no mundo orgânico, 1905
- Os Muckers – Episódio Histórico Ocorrido Nas Colônias Alemãs do Rio Grande do Sul, 1912, about the Revolt of the Muckers

His book about the Muckers has proven to be a particularly interesting document not only because it does convey a lot of information about the event and the main characters who played a crucial role in it, but also since it tells, perhaps even more about the pervasive attitude of his time and the local social context towards non-conforming minority religious thinking and practices.

Schupp was fluent in many languages: High German, Latin, Spanish, and the Riograndenser Hunsrückisch German vernacular most prominently used in the German-speaking regions of Southern Brazil. He died in Porto Alegre.

== See also ==
- German-Brazilian
