= Drozdowo, Olecko County =

Drozdowo
- Village
- Location within Poland
- Coordinates: 54°10′N 22°30′E
- Country: Poland
- Voivodeship: Warmian-Masurian
- County: Olecko
- Gmina: Kowale Oleckie
- Population (approx.): 250

Drozdowo [drɔzˈdɔvɔ] is a village in the administrative district of Gmina Kowale Oleckie, within Olecko County, Warmian-Masurian Voivodeship, in northern Poland.

== Notable residents ==
- Gustav von Saltzwedel (1808–1897), German politician.
- Wilhelm von Saltzwedel (1820–1882), German public official.
