= Ernst Gustav Zaddach =

German scientist (1817–1881)

Ernst Gustav Zaddach (7 June 1817, Danzig – 5 June 1881, Königsberg) was a German geologist and zoologist, who made contributions in the fields of carcinology and entomology. He is also known for his investigations of amber found in Samland (Baltic coast).

From 1836 to 1841 he studied sciences at the universities of Berlin and Bonn and later taught classes in natural history at the Collegium Fridericianum in Königsberg. In 1854 he became an associate professor, and in 1863 a full professor of zoology at the University of Königsberg. In 1862, he was appointed director of the zoological museum in Königsberg.

The amphipod species Gammarus zaddachi (Sexton, 1912) is named after him.

== Selected writings ==
- De apodis cancriformis Schaeff. Anatome et historia evolutionis, 1841 (dissertation).
- Synopseos crustaceorum prussicorum prodromus, 1844 (habilitation thesis).
- Untersuchungen über die Entwickelung und den Bau der Gliederthiere, 1854 – Studies on the development and construction of Articulata.
- Holopedium gibberum, ein neues Crustaceum aus der Familie der Branchiopoden 1855 – Holopedium gibberum, a new crustacean of Branchiopoda.
- Beschreibung neuer oder wenig bekannter Blattwespen aus dem Gebiete der Preussischen Fauna 1859 – Description of new or little-known sawflies of Prussia.
- Heinrich Rathke, 1861 – Biography of Martin Heinrich Rathke.
- Beobachtungen über die Arten der Blatt- und Holzwespen, 1863 (with Carl Gustav Alexander Brischke) – Observations on types of leaf and wood wasps.
- Beobachtungen über das Vorkommen des Bernsteins und die Ausdehnung des Tertiärgebirges in Westpreussen und Pommern, 1869 – Observations on the occurrence of amber, and the expansion of Tertiary formations in West Prussia and Pomerania.
