= Jacobina Mentz Maurer =

Brazilian female religious leader

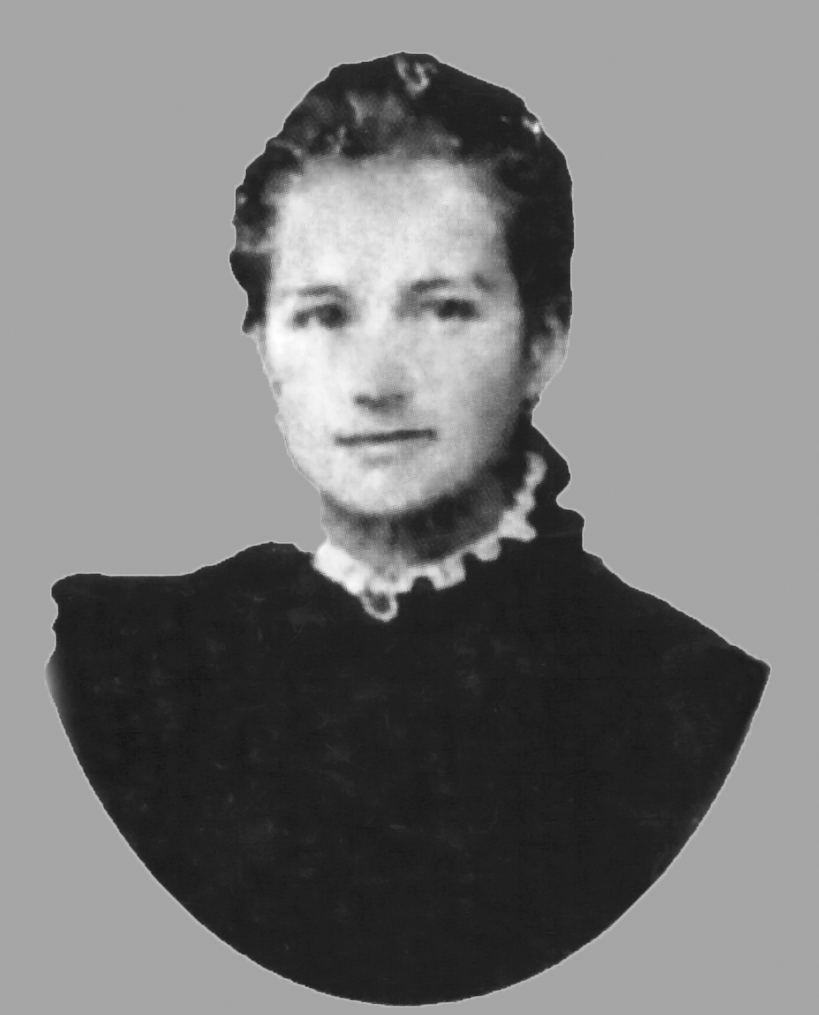

Personal life
- Born: June 1841 or 1842 Novo Hamburgo
- Died: August 2, 1874 Sapiranga
- Spouse: João Jorge Maurer

Jacobina Mentz Maurer (June 1841 or 1842 – August 2, 1874) was a Brazilian religious leader. She led the Revolt of the Muckers that happened in a German community in Brazil.

== Biography ==
=== Early life ===
Jacobina Mentz was the daughter of André Mentz and Maria Elisabeth Müller, German immigrants from Tambach-Dietharz, Thuringia, Germany. They arrived in Brazil on November 6, 1824 fleeing religious persecution (both left the Protestant church and established an independent religious community, and then they began to be persecuted by the locals). Their daughter, Jacobina Mentz, was born in Brazil and raised in what is today known as Novo Hamburgo, Rio Grande do Sul, in a rural community composed of religious German immigrants, with both Lutheran and Catholic members. Jacobina's family was responsible for building the first Protestant church in Southern Brazil. On April 26, 1866, Jacobina married João Jorge Maurer, also the son of German immigrants. In the same year, the couple moved from Novo Hamburgo to Ferrabráz, in what is now Sapiranga.

=== The Muckers ===
In 1868, João Maurer had a "divine vision", telling him to abandon the crop in order to be a doctor. Soon after he met healer Buchhorn, who taught him the secrets of medicinal herbs. These Germans lived in an isolated rural community without access to medical care. Therefore, many people used to consult local healers. In 1870, the couple started to receive at home people for meetings of Bible reading around Jacobina. Jacobina suffered from fainting attacks since she was 12 years old and people associated her sleepwalking situation with special powers. Soon, hundreds of people started to follow Jacobina and her teachings. Many people left the local Catholic or Lutheran churches and established a fanatical sect, with Jacobina being their leader. This situation worried the local priests and the members of the community who did not join the others. Then the community was divided into two: those who joined Jacobina were known as Mucker (German for "False Saint") and those who were against Jacobina known as Spötter (debauchee). Jacobina was treated as the manifestation of God. Later people started to see her as the reincarnation of Jesus Christ. Conflicts between the followers of Jacobina (Muckers) and their enemies (Spotters) increased when people began to buy weapons. Policemen raided Jacobina's house and found the weapons. She was arrested during a crisis of lethargy and conducted to São Leopoldo, sleeping for 9 hours. To wake her up, the doctors used stinging needle and tip of knife. However, she only woke up when her followers started singing after 5 hours of attempts. Jacobina was released and received with great affection by the community.

People who were against the Muckers started to be murdered. Major conflicts between the community members began to happen. On December 10, 1873 João Maurer, along with two other members, went to then Brazil's capital, Rio de Janeiro, to deliver a petition to the Emperor Pedro II, complaining of police harassment, beatings and insults and moral heritage against other settlers. Representatives of the Empire requested explanations from the authorities of Rio Grande do Sul on the case.

On May 4, 1874 around 100 to 500 Muckers met in the Maurers' home. Jacobina announced the end of the world and ordered the extermination of 16 enemy families. On June 15 Jacobina's followers massacred the Kassel family. An arrest warrant was issued for the Maurers as a result. On June 25, 14 Spotter houses were burned and 10 people were killed, including children. Soon there was open conflict between the Muckers and the Spotters, resulting in violence and several deaths. On June 28, the police attacked, but the Muckers won the conflict. This contributed to the Muckers' belief in Jacobina's divinity. After another failed attack, Jacobina succeeded in escaping and hiding in Ferrabraz.

The revolt ended on August 2 of that year, when a traitor, Carlos Luppa, led the police to Jacobina's hideout. She and the majority of her followers were killed in the attack. The Muckers who survived were tried and released or absorbed on June 16, 1880. Even after Jacobina's death, there are records of the survival of the Muckers into the late 1890s. On October 23–24, 1897 three people were killed and the crime was attributed to the Muckers led by Aurélia Maurer, the daughter of Jacobina. In 1898, a group of 100 Germans murdered 5 Muckers in the region of Nova Petrópolis and Lajeado.

== Filmography ==
In 1978, filmmaker Jorge Bodansky reproduced the Revolt of the Muckers in the film Os Muckers (in Germany, it was named Jakobine). In 2002, filmmaker Fábio Barreto reproduced the Revolt in the movie A Paixão de Jacobina, with actress Letícia Spiller in the lead role.
