= Herbert Meinhard Mühlpfordt =

German historian

Professor Herbert Meinhard Mühlpfordt
- Born: 31 March 1893; Königsberg, Germany
- Died: 9 October 1982 (aged 89); Lübeck, West Germany
- Education: University of Freiburg; Ludwig-Maximilians-Universität München; University of Königsberg
- Occupations: internist, art historian, and cultural historian.

Herbert Meinhard Mühlpfordt (31 March 1893 – 9 October 1982) was a German internist, art historian, and cultural historian.

== Life ==
Mühlpfordt was born in Königsberg, East Prussia, to dentist Meinhard Mühlpfordt and Clara Mühlpfordt (née Adloff). He attended the Collegium Fridericianum where he completed his Abitur. Mühlpfordt studied medicine, literature, and art history at the University of Freiburg (1912), the Ludwig-Maximilians-Universität München (1912–13), and the Albertina in Königsberg (1913–14). After serving in World War I from 1914 to 1918, he completed his Staatsexamen in 1920 and received his doctorate in medicine in 1921. Mühlpfordt worked at the Charité in Berlin, in Allenstein (Olsztyn) (1922), and as chief of dermatology at St. Marien-Hospital in Allenstein (1929–37). In 1937, he opened his doctor's practice in Königsberg.

During World War II Mühlpfordt served as a physician (Stabsarzt and Oberstabsarzt) in the Wehrmacht from 1939 until his discharge for health reasons in 1944. From January 1945 until April he tended to refugees in Pillau (Baltiysk) and the Vistula Spit during the evacuation of East Prussia. On 16 April he took a refugee transport to Wismar. He settled in Lübeck, where he maintained his practice until 1959.

Aside from his medical practice, Mühlpfordt also wrote about the local history of East and West Prussia, especially his hometown Königsberg, contributing to newspapers, journals, and his reference works. He also wrote a novel about Wilhelmine Königsberg, Der Goldene Ball, Ein Familienroman unserer Zeit. Mühlpfordt was recognized by the Historische Kommission für ost- und westpreußische Landesforschung in 1969, received the Goldene Ehrennadel of the Landsmannschaft Ostpreußen in 1970, and received the Bürgermedaille of the Stadtgemeinschaft Königsberg in 1977. He died in Lübeck.

== Selected works ==
- Welche Mitbürger hat Königsberg öffentlich geehrt? (1963)
- Königsberger Leben in Bräuchen und Volkstum (1968)
- Königsberger Skulpturen und ihre Meister 1255–1945 (1970)
- Königsberg von A-Z. Ein Stadtlexikon (1972)
- Königsberger Leben im Rokoko. Bedeutende Zeitgenossen Kants (1981)
