= Franz Albert Schultz =

Franz Albert Schultz (25 September 1692 – 19 May 1763) was a German Lutheran pastor.

== Biography ==
Schultz was born on 25 September 1692 in Neustettin (Szczecinek), Brandenburg-Prussia. He studied at the University of Halle philosophy under Christian Wolff and theology. At this time he followed August Hermann Francke's Pietism. In 1723, having declined becoming a professor, he became educator at the Berlin Cadet Corps and in 1724 field preacher in Mohrungen. In 1728 he became Archpriest and Superintendent in Rastenburg. In 1731, Schultz came to Königsberg as pastor; in 1732, he became doctor of theology and professor of theology at the University of Königsberg.

In 1733, Schultz was also appointed director of the Collegium Fridericianum in Königsberg, a post he held until his death in 1763; Immanuel Kant was among his pupils at the Collegium.

With the influence of Wolff and Francke's Pietism, Schultz's theology can be partly seen as an attempt to synthesize Pietism and Wolffian ideas by formulating Pietistic ideas using Wolffian methodology and terminology.

As Superintendent, Schultz instituted the first Prussian teacher seminaries, founded more than 600 schools, and paved the way to compulsory education. Under Frederick II, who was skeptical of Pietism, his influence sank.

Schultz died on 19 May 1763 in Königsberg.

== See also ==
- Martin Knutzen
