= Gustav von Saltzwedel =

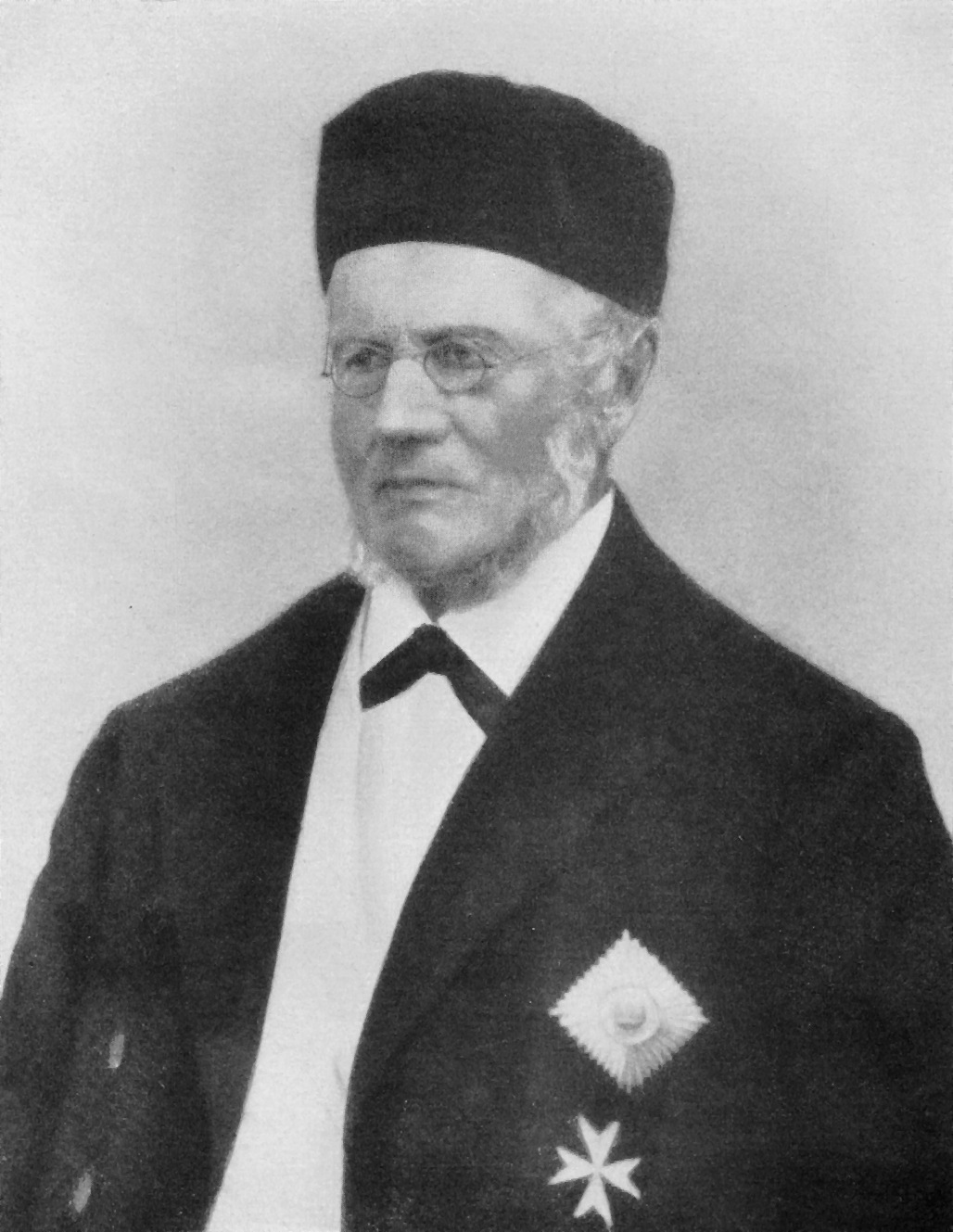
- Gustav von Saltzwedel

Frankfurt Parliament
- In office 25 May 1848 – 31 March 1849
- Constituency: Gumbinnen

Second Chamber of the Prussian Landtag
- Incumbent
- Assumed office 1849
- Constituency: Gumbinnen

Prussian Landtag
- In office 1867–1869
- Constituency: Gumbinnen

Parliament of the North German Confederation
- In office 1867–1870
- Constituency: Gumbinnen

Personal details
- Born: 28 April 1808 Drosdowen, East Prussia
- Died: 19 June 1897 (aged 89) Pötschendorf, East Prussia
- Party: Casino faction centre-right
- Occupation: Jurist

Gustav Reinhold Ludwig von Wienskowski gen. von Saltzwedel (28 April 1808 – 19 June 1897) was a Prussian politician and public official.

== Biography ==
Saltzwedel was born to Reinhold von Wienskowski (1780–1863) and Johanna née von Saltzwedel (1788–1828) in Drosdowen, East Prussia (today Drozdowo, Poland). His father had adopted his wife's name at his marriage; although officially still named von Wienskowski, the family was allowed to use the name von Saltzwedel. He was the oldest brother of Wilhelm von Saltzwedel (1820–1882).

Saltzwedel studied law at the Universities of Königsberg and Berlin in 1827-30 and was a co-founder of the Burschenschaft Corps Littuania in Königsberg. After completing his studies he served as head of the district administration (Landrat) of Marggrabowa from 1833 to 1841.

In 1844/45 Saltzwedel was a Geheimrat, from 1846 to 1851 Regierungspräsident in Gumbinnen, and in 1847 head of the district administrative court in Königsberg. He was the director of the East Prussian Poverty Commission and Commissioner of the Lithauische Friedensgesellschaft (Lithuanian Peace Society). In 1848 he became a member of the Frankfurt Parliament and in 1849 member of the Second Chamber of the Prussian Landtag. He was a mentor of Bethel Henry Strousberg concerning the financing of the East Prussian Southern Railway and the head of its supervisory board. In 1867, Saltzwedel was elected as a member of the Parliament of the North German Confederation (until 1870) and the Preußisches Abgeordnetenhaus (until 1869).

Saltzwedel was married to Auguste Zimmermann (19 November 1822 in Marggrabowa – 9 July 1911 in Königsberg). He had a son and three daughters.

Saltzwedel died on his estate at Pötschendorf.

== Literature ==
- Gothaisches Genealogisches Taschenbuch der Adeligen Häuser, Alter Adel und Briefadel 1928, Seite 727, Verlag Justus Perthes, Gotha 1928
- Lothar Selke: Zur Erinnerung an das 150jährige Bundesfest der Littuania: 31. Januar 1829 - 31. Januar 1979, München 1979
- Walter Passauer: Corpstafel der Littuania zu Königsberg, Königsberg 1935
- Max Pauly: Chronik der Landsmannschaft Littuania während ihres 60jährigen Bestehens, 1829-1889, Königsberg i. Pr. 1889
