= Martin Knutzen =

German philosopher (1713–1751)

- Born: 14 December 1713; Königsberg, Prussia
- Died: 29 January 1751 (aged 37); Königsberg, Prussia

Education
- Education: University of Königsberg (MA, 1733; PhD, 1734)
- Academic advisor: Johann Gottfried Teske

Philosophical work
- Era: 18th-century philosophy
- Region: Western philosophy
- School: Enlightenment philosophy Rationalism
- Institutions: University of Königsberg
- Notable students: Immanuel Kant
- Notable ideas: Synthesis of religious Pietism, Wolffian metaphysics, and Lockean epistemology

Martin Knutzen (German: [ˈknʊt͡sn̩]; 14 December 1713 – 29 January 1751) was a German philosopher, a follower of Christian Wolff and teacher of Immanuel Kant, to whom he introduced the physics of Isaac Newton.

== Biography ==
Martin Knutzen was born in Königsberg (now Kaliningrad, Russia) in 1713.

Knutzen studied philosophy, mathematics and physics at the University of Königsberg (the present Kaliningrad), gaining his M.A. degree in 1733 with Dissertatio metaphysica de aeternitate mundi impossibili and becoming a Professor Extraordinary of logic and metaphysics there in 1735 on the basis of his 1734 doctoral thesis Commentatio de commercio mentis et corporis per influxum physicum. A follower of Christian Wolff, in the rationalist school, Knutzen was also interested in natural sciences, and taught physics, astronomy and mathematics, besides philosophy. The study of the doctrines of Newton induced him to question Leibniz' and Wolff's theory of pre-established harmony, defending the concept of mechanical causality in the movement of physical objects; his lessons on the matter would influence the later work of Immanuel Kant, who sought to reconcile the autonomy of the spiritual with the reality of the mechanical in the Critique of Judgement.

Knutzen would be an important figure in the formation of his Königsberg University students Kant and Johann Georg Hamann (proponent of the Sturm und Drang literary movement).

Knutzen died in Königsberg in 1751.

=== Influence on Kant ===
As a young extraordinary professor at the University of Königsberg, Knutzen, who had a strong personality, influenced Kant strongly during the latter's studies, planting in him the seed of philosophy and sciences.

Kant kept in close contact with Knutzen. Knutzen introduced him to the study of mechanics and optics, besides discussing faith extensively. Knutzen's ample private library on natural sciences constituted an invaluable resource for the writing of the first treatise of Kant, Thoughts on the True Estimation of Vital Forces (Gedanken von der wahren Schätzung der lebendigen Kräfte), a mathematical text, and exerted a powerful influence on Kant's thought.

It was Knutzen who introduced Kant to the scientific literature of the era and especially the works of Isaac Newton, who had such a powerful influence on the development of Kant's own philosophy. Knutzen, however, did not consider Kant to be one of his best students, and favoured Friedrich Johann Buck (1722–1786) or Johann Friedrich Weitenkampf (1726–1758). Moreover, the name of Kant never appeared in the profuse correspondence between Knutzen and Leonhard Euler, which is evidence of in what little esteem Knutzen held Kant.

Knutzen was 10 years Kant's senior and reached professorship at the early age of 21 years. His advancedness did not, however, lead him on to greater responsibilities. External pressures prevented him from ever receiving an ordinary professorship. Like his disciple Kant, Knutzen led a life removed from worldly noise and dedicated to study. His sedentarism meant that he never ventured more than thirty miles from his native town of Königsberg.

On 29 January 1751, Flottwell wrote that although Knutzen had inherited first 10,000 then a further 15,000 Thaler, "this philosopher was always in a bad mood, had no social contacts and lived in absolute isolation". Only three days after Flottwell wrote this, Knutzen was dead (Kuehn, 2001). Indeed, his temperament, given as he was to impetuousness and academic overexertion, brought his life to an early end at the age of 37 years. At the time of his death, he enjoyed a magnificent reputation and was greatly admired by his students, among whom he numbered Kant. Knutzen acquainted Kant with both the latest scientific advances and discoveries and British empiricism.

Knutzen's widow remarried a close friend of Kant's, a doctor of jurisprudence and young lawyer, Johann Daniel Funk (1721–1764). Kant felt quite at home with Funk, and they kept in close contact with each other. Funk had an extremely fascinating personality and led what one might describe as an exceedingly dissolute life. He gave lectures on jurisprudence and, as Hippet said (Borowski, 1804), "Precisely because he could live without the income from his lectures, Funk was by far the best of the professors (Magister). Even at that time it was evident to me that gentlemen that had other income had one or more concubines apart from their official spouse. My dear old Funk, who had married the widow of professor Knutzen, a very famous person at the time, did not deprive himself of other diversions apart from the conjugal act, but his lectures were as chaste as the bed of an elegy".

== Thought ==
Knutzen sought to strike a balance between Pietist Lutheranism and Christian Wolff's dogmatic philosophy, trying to compatibilize the teachings of Pietism with the hypotheses of Wolff's illustrated philosophy. Knutzen saw philosophy not merely as a propaedeutic for gaining access to theology, but as a separate science that established its own postulates. This is patent from one of his writings, published in 1740, the year in which Kant joined the university, titled "Philosophical Proof of the Truth of the Christian Religion" (Knutzen, 1740). This volume, which was to become his most famous work and built him a reputation in the 18th century, stated that philosophy is the depository of rational proof, even of religion itself. In writing this book, not only did Knutzen show how strongly rooted his thinking was in Königsberg's theological debate, but he also revealed his intimate knowledge of what had until then been an unknown aspect of British philosophy. The book also offers a good picture of Knutzen's theological standpoint. This work originally appeared as a series of articles in the "Königsberger Intelligenzblätter" (Knutzen, 1745). This way, Knutzen brought a breath of fresh, modern and advanced air into the Prussian cultural milieu dominated by Franz Albert Schultz's Pietist theology.

Philosophically speaking, Knutzen took an anti-Leibnizian standpoint, sustaining that the theory of pre-established harmony was as wrong, just like occasionalism, and that the only reasonable theory was that of physical influx, as suggested by Locke and corpuscularism. In fact, Leibniz' theory of pre-established harmony in its strictest form was unacceptable for Knutzen on theological grounds. There were also differences and controversy between what Knutzen, Kant, Leibniz, Descartes and Newton thought about the concept of living force, dead pressure and momentum. And yet again, Newton was right in the end. Accordingly, Knutzen's standpoints were closer to British than German philosophers. A similar thing can be said about his epistemology. Indeed, death surprised him when he was translating Locke's treatise entitled Of the Conduct of the Understanding.

In 1744, an important controversy shook the scientific and academic media of the time. Years earlier, in 1738, Knutzen had predicted that a comet that had been observed in 1698 would reappear in the winter of 1744. This prediction was, apparently, based on Newton's theory about the course of periodic comets with elliptical orbits of the Sun. (Waschkies, 1987). When a comet actually did appear in that year, Knutzen became an instant celebrity in the town and gained a reputation as a great astronomer well beyond the confines of Königsberg. In 1744, Knutzen published a book titled "Rational thoughts on the comets, in which is examined and represented their nature and their character, as well as the causes of their motion, and at the same time given a short description of the noteworthy comet of this year". This book was, according to Christian Jakob Kraus (1753–1807), Kant's most intelligent disciple, responsible for awakening Kant's interest in this science, and it was this book that led him to write his own "Universal Natural History and Theory of the Heavens" (Kant, 1755), which appeared eleven years later. Like other students, Kant may have viewed Knutzen as a hero.

However, doubts were soon raised and by none other than the great and prolific mathematician, Leonhard Euler. In fact, Euler showed, in letters to Knutzen and in an article that appeared at the end of 1744, that Knutzen's prediction had not come true. The reason was clear: the 1744 comet was not identical to the 1698 comet. This meant that Knutzen did not know enough physics (Waschkies, 1987). Euler sustained that it would be at least four to five hundred years before the 1698 comet could be seen again. But this refutation did not seem to matter much to most of the people of Königsberg and even less so to Knutzen and his students. They never acknowledged that their master's prediction had been wrong. In fact, in a poem written for the occasion of Knutzen's burial, he was compared with Newton, Descartes, Leibniz, Locke and Boyle.

Knutzen's work on comets was in any case largely motivated by theological concerns. It was written in part as a response to a tract, penned by Johann Heyn and entitled "Attempt of a Consideration of the Comet, the Deluge and the Prelude of the Final Judgement; in Accordance with Astronomical Reasons and the Bible…", which appeared in Berlin and Leipzig in 1742. Heyn argued that the fear of comets as a bad omen was well founded. Knutzen, referencing Newton, objected to this view and concluded that Heyn was an alarmist and obscurantist. In return, Heyn accused Knutzen of plagiarism, as the prediction had been made a year earlier in the "Leipziger Gelehrte Anzeigen". He also suggested that Knutzen had not sufficiently proved the respective identities of the 1698 and 1744 comets. Knutzen and his students ignored Heyn's reference to Euler, just as they did Euler's original criticism.

Knutzen's understanding of scientific and mathematical matters was inadequate for advancing the discussion of the more technical aspects of physics. Knutzen did not belong to that "small elite" of scientists on the continent who understood the details of Newtonian physics. His knowledge of calculus was far from perfect. Relying more on mechanical models than on rigorous calculations, he had some understanding of Newton's Philosophiæ Naturalis Principia Mathematica but was unable to make any original contribution to science. Nor was he willing to draw a sharp line between science and metaphysics. Theological and apologetic concerns dictated what was and was not acceptable at least as much as scientific views did. As a scientist, he was rather limited even by 18th century standards.

Of Knutzen it was said that, as a student, he approached not the Aristotelians but "the men who were qualified enough to be able to instruct him in the most recent philosophy, mathematics". Knutzen taught himself calculus and appears to have studied algebra from Wolf's work in Latin (Buck, 1768). Although perhaps Knutzen's most important contribution to mathematics, or, to be more precise, number theory, is more of a historical sort. In fact, Knutzen, in his exceptional essay entitled "Von dem Wahren Auctore der Arithmeticae Binariae, …", in English "On the True Author of Binary Arithmetic, also known as Leibniz' Dyadic" (Knutzen, 1742), rightly claims that the binary number system credited by many, including the man himself, to Leibniz, was actually attributable to the Spanish bishop Juan Caramuel de Lobkowitz (Caramuel, 1670), and outlined in the "Meditatio Proemialis" of his work, entitled, true to the Baroque style of the time, "Mathesis bíceps vetrus et nova. In omnibus, et singulis veterum, et recientorum placita examinantur; interdum corriguntur, semper dilucidantur…".

== Works (selection) ==
- Philosophischer Beweis von der Wahrheit der christlichen Religion, 1740
- Von dem Wahren Auctore der Arithmeticae Binariae, oder sogennanten Leibnitzianischen Dyadic, 1742
- Philosophische Abhandlung von der immateriellen Natur der Seele, 1744
- Vernünftige Gedanken von den Cometen, 1744
- Systema causarum efficientium seu commentatio philosophica de commercio mentis et corporis per influxum physicum explicando, 1745
- Philosophischer Beweiß von der Wahrheit der Christlichen Religion, Darinnen die Nothwendigkeit der Christlichen Insbesondere aus Ungezweifelten Gründen der Vernunft nach Mathematischer Lehrart dargethan und behauptet wird, Königsberg: Härtung, 1747
- Elementa philosophiae rationalis seu logicae cum generalis tun specialioris mathematica methodo demonstrata, 1747 (reprint: Hildesheim: Georg Olms, 1991)
- Vertheidigte Wahrheit der Christlichen Religion gegen den Einwurf: Daß die Christliche Offenbahrung nich allgemein sey: Wobey besonders die Scheingründe des bekannten Englischen Deisten Mattüi Tindal, Welche in deßen Beweise, Daß das Christentum so alt wie die Welt sey, enthalten, erwogen und winderlegt werden. Königsberg: Härtung, 1747 (reprint: Verlag Traugott Bautz GmbH, 2005)

== References and further reading ==
- Macmillan's Encyclopedia of Philosophy, 2nd edition (Donald M. Borchert, chief editor), 2006, ISBN 0-02-865780-2.
- Beck, L. W.: Early German Philosophy: Kant and His Predecessors. Belknap Press of Hardward University Press. Cambridge. 1960.
- Borowski, L. E.: Darstellung des Leben und Charakters Inmanuel Kants. Königsberg. 1804.
- Buck, J. F.: Lebensbeschreibungen derer verstorbenen preussischen Mathematizer. 1764.
- Caramuel, J.: Mathesis biceps vetus et nova. 2 vols. L. Annison. Campaniae. 1670.
- Erdmann, B.: Martin Knutzen und Seine Zeit. Ein Beitrag zur Geschichte der Wolffischen Schule und Insbesondere Zur Entwicklungsgeschichte Kants. Leipzig. 1876. Reprint: Hildesheim. 1973.
- Fehr, James Jakob: "Ein wunderlicher nexus rerum." Aufklärung und Pietismus in Königsberg unter Franz Albert Schultz. Hildesheim, 2005.
- Kant, I.: Allgemeine Naturgeschichte und Theorie des Himmels oder Versuch von der Verfassung dem Mechanischen Ursprunge des ganzen Weltgebäudes, nach Newtonischen Grundsätzen abgehandelt. Petersen. Königsberg und Leipzig. 1755.
- Kuehn, M.: Kant. A Biography. Cambridge University Press. Cambridge. 2001.
- Waschkies, H.-J.: Physik und Physikotheologie des Jungen Kant. Die Vorgeschichte seiner allgemeinen Weltgeschichte und Theorie des Himmels. Gruner. Amsterdam. 1987.
