= Revolt of the Muckers =

Conflict between two groups in Southern Brazil in 1873 and 1874

Mucker's Revolt
Date	1873–19 July 1874
Location	Sapiranga, Rio Grande do Sul, Brazil
Result	Government victory

Belligerents
Muckers	Empire of Brazil; Spotters

Commanders and leaders
Jacobina Mentz Maurer †	Colonel Genuino Sampaio †; Col. César Augusto; Col. Carlos Telles; Cap. Santiago Dantas

Strength
700-1,000	600 soldiers 150 volunteer civilians

Casualties and losses
approximately 150 killed, hundreds captured	at least 40 soldiers killed (including Colonel Genuino)

The Revolt of the Muckers was a conflict between two groups in a German community in Southern Brazil, in 1873 and 1874. It took place in the region of Sapiranga, Rio Grande do Sul, Brazil. Jacobina Mentz Maurer, believed by some to be a prophet, led a conflict that was eventually quelled by the Brazilian military, and its leaders either killed or arrested and imprisoned.

== History ==
=== German settlement ===
Before emancipation in 1955, Sapiranga was considered the fifth district of São Leopoldo. The whole region of Vale do Rio dos Sinos started to be settled by German immigrants on July 25, 1824. These Germans, mostly farmers, were brought by the Brazilian Government to populate this inhospitable area of Brazil. In the first 50 years of immigration, between 20 and 28 thousand Germans arrived, almost all of them for agricultural settlement. The first settlers were recruited by Major Antônio Jorge Schäffer and taken to the current town of São Leopoldo. The immigrants had to build their own houses, received seeds for planting and livestock for sustenance. From São Leopoldo, the Germans cleared the area, following the path of rivers. In some years, the whole region of Vale do Rio dos Sinos was being occupied by German settlers. In 1826 the first tannery was built in the valley. Next, wheat mills were built, a soap factory, tools, workshops, cutting of stones, and a huge number of shoes.

=== The Muckers ===
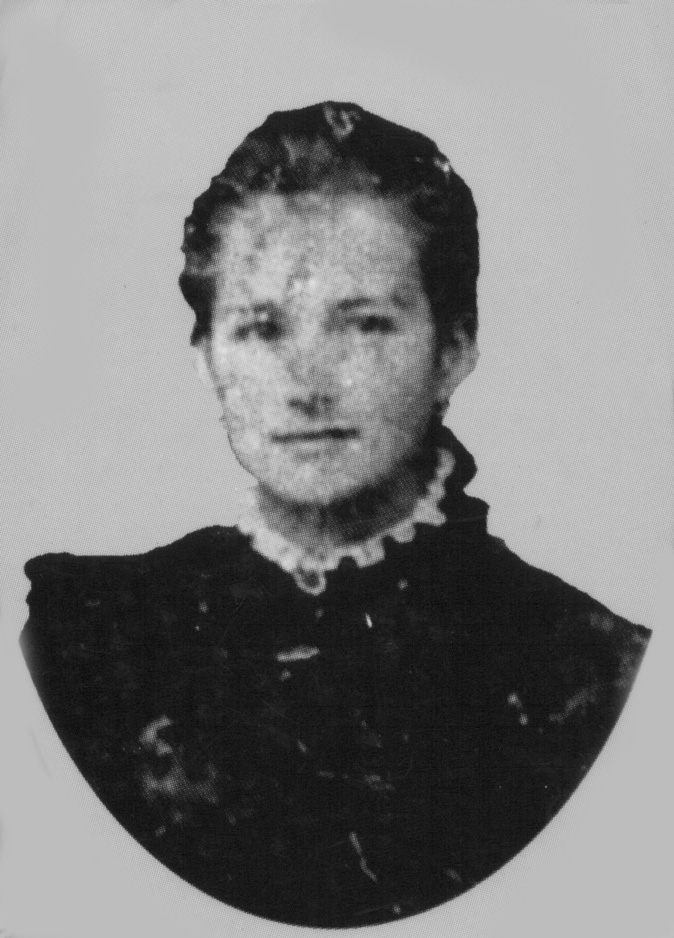
Jacobina Mentz Maurer, the leader of the Muckers.

These Germans lived in an isolated rural community without access to medical care. Therefore, many of them used to consult local healers. Jacobina Mentz, a local inhabitant, who had suffered from epileptic attacks since childhood, then she was seen as the victim of a disorder of the nervous system, aggravated by elements of religious nature. Jacobina's family was already involved in religious issues. Her grandparents, Libório Mentz and Ernestina Magdalene Lips, immigrated from Germany, escaping religious persecution to which the Muckers were subjected to after their leaders lost a libel case.

In 1826, Jacobina's uncle, Libório Mentz built the first Protestant church of São Leopoldo. Gradually, Jacobina mingled religion with care to patients, reading biblical passages to patients. She married the former soldier, Joao Jorge Mauer, in 1866. He had learned some herbal healing and shortly became known as the Wunderdocktor (miracle doctor). Shortly after the birth of her first child she started to lose consciousness from time to time. Beginning in 1868, neighbors started to meet at the house, built on land she had inherited from her father. They sang, prayed, read the Bible, shared communal meals and then returned to their homes. The meetings corresponded frequently with Jacobina's trances, in which her body abandoned all sense and reason. Initially, the word of these trances and the corresponding herbal medicines remained locally known, but over time, though, news traveled, and people came to the Maurer's house for healing of the body and the mind.

On May 4, 1873, Jacobina preached to a congregation and an estimated 100 to 500 people were present. Although local clergy prohibited people from watching her trances, she attracted crowds of followers; the local clergy then accused her of interpreting the Bible in a messianic manner, of calling herself the reincarnation of Jesus Christ, engaging in adultery and disobedience. Gradually ostracized, the Muckers sought revenge by ambushing several local authorities and burning some neighboring homes.

Jacobina ordered her followers to leave the church and the local school, because, according to her, the institutions were not teaching the true Gospel anymore. This attitude irritated the religious members and a large part of the community that was not following Mentz and split the community: those who joined Jacobina were known as Mucker (because they were effectively rolling in the muck with their "false saint") and those who were against Jacobina were known as Spotter (a slang word for spy, or a combination of Portuguese and German slang, for stuttering informant). Among those against Jacobina were Karl von Koseritz, the founder of the Deutsche Zeitung (German Newspaper) of Porto Alegre and diverse Lutheran priests. The clashes led to the arrest of the leaders of the movement by local police, who were later released at the request of the President of the Province of Rio Grande do Sul. On December 10, 1873 João Maurer, along with two other members, went to then Brazil's capital, Rio de Janeiro, to deliver a petition to the Emperor Pedro II, complaining of police harassment, beatings and insults to the moral heritage of other settlers. Representatives of the Empire requested explanations from the authorities of Rio Grande do Sul on the case.

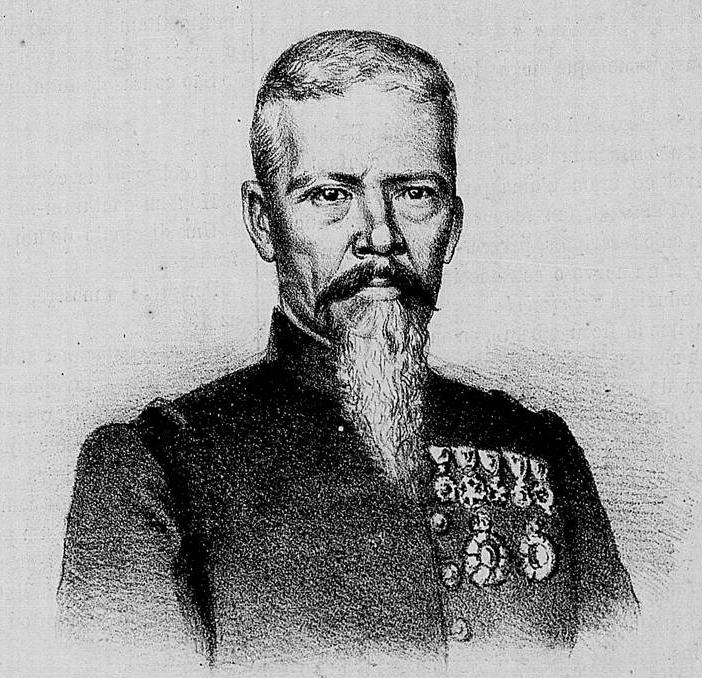
Colonel Genuino Sampaio, killed in action

On May 24, 1874 a great religious service was held in Ferrabraz, where Jacobina announced the end of the world and ordered the extermination of 16 families. On June 15 the massacre of the Kassel family occurred. An arrest warrant was issued for the Maurer couple. On June 25, 14 houses of the Muckers' enemies were burned and 10 people were killed, including children. Soon there were several conflicts between the Muckers and the Spotters, resulting in violence and several deaths. On June 28, the police attacked, but the Muckers won the conflict. This contributed to belief in the divinity of Jacobina.

On 19 July 1874, according to military records, provincial and imperial troops, supported by locals, attacked the Maurer's house was and set it on fire during a meeting. Dozens of men and women, and their children, died in the attack in addition to Genuino Sampaio. Although several survivors were arrested, Jacobina escaped with her newborn child and hid in the nearby woods. Two weeks later, locals colonists and soldiers found and killed the group, and mutilated the bodies: Jacobina's mouth was slit. They were all placed in a common grave in the forest, but Jorge Maurer's body was never found.

Even after Jacobina's death, there are records of the presence of Muckers as late as 1897 and 1898. On October 23–24, 1897 three people were killed and the crime was attributed to the Muckers led by Aurélia Maurer, the daughter of Jacobina. In 1898, a group of 100 Germans murdered 5 Muckers in the region of Nova Petrópolis and Lajeado.

== Popular culture ==
There is also a 1901 book of the same title, Os Muckers, by Pe. Ambrosio Schupp, S.J., originally published in German as Die Mucker in 1901 and subsequent studies of the 19th Century German pietism in such works as O episódio do Ferrabraz (Os mucker).

In 1978, filmmaker Jorge Bodansky reproduced the story of the revolt in the film Os Muckers (in Germany, it was named Jakobine). On 27 September 2002, filmmaker Fábio Barreto A Paixão de Jacobina (The Passion of Jacobina) with actress Letícia Spiller in the lead role.
