= Bartholomeus Dolendo =

Dutch engraver, draftsman and goldsmith (d. 1626)

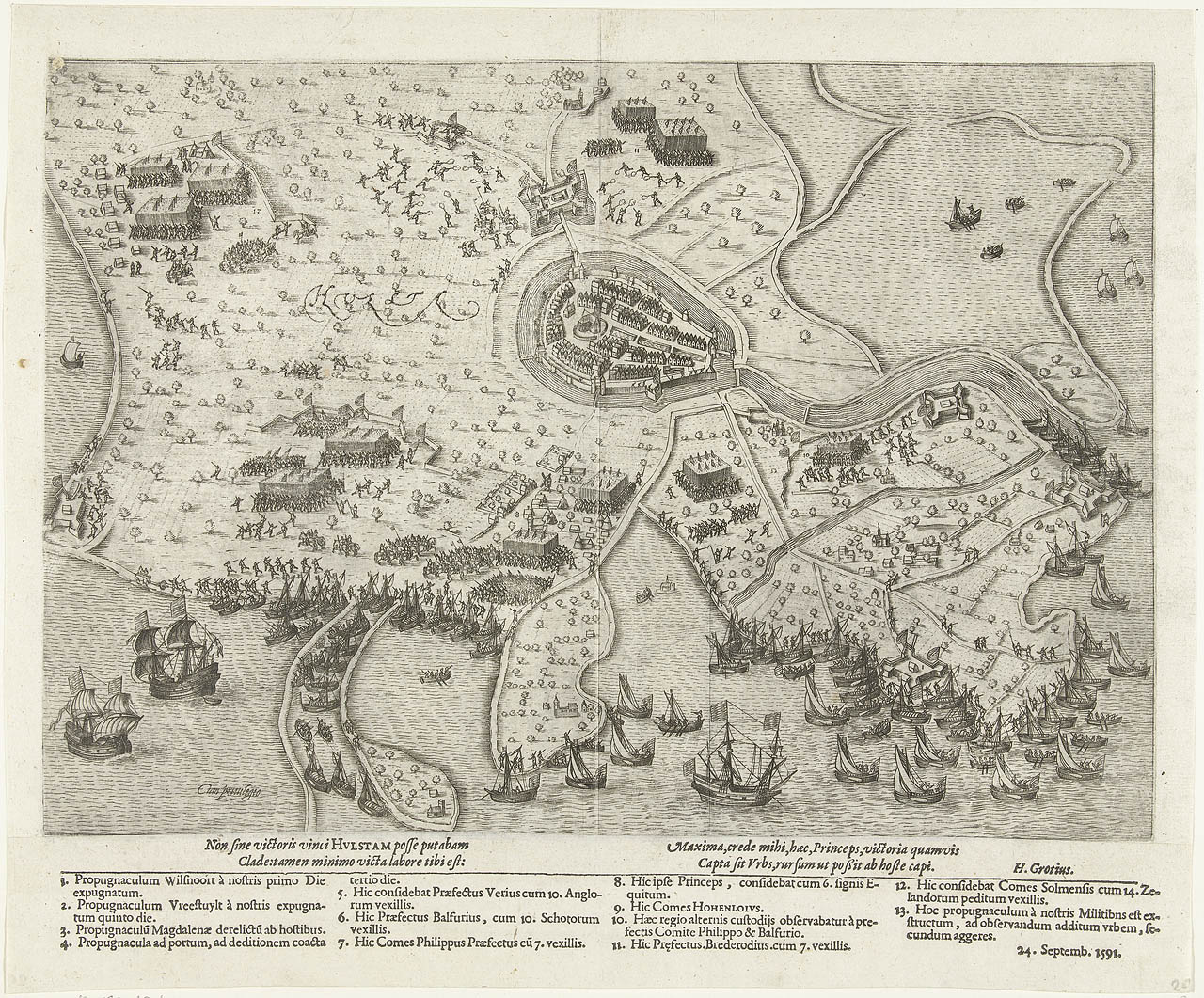
Siege of Hulst by Prince Maurice, 1591, engraving by Dolendo, poem by Hugo Grotius

Bartholomeus Willemsz Dolendo (c. 1570 in Leiden? – buried 27 May 1626 in Leiden) a Dutch engraver, draftsman and goldsmith. He is presumed to have been instructed in engraving by Hendrik Goltzius. He worked entirely with the graver, in an open, clear style. There are by him several plates, some of which are from his own designs. He occasionally marked his prints with his name, but more frequently with a cipher.

Among other engravings by him are the following:

- Jonah thrown back on the Sea-shore; the same.
- A Dutch Merry-making; after his own design.
- Adam and Eve taking the Forbidden Fruit; after C. van Mander.
- Christ appearing to the Magdalen; B. Dolendo, inv. et fec.
- The Holy Family; after M. Coxcie.
- St. John preaching in the Wilderness.
- Pyramus and Thisbe; after Crispin van den Broeck.
- Jupiter and Ceres; an allegorical subject; after B. Spranger.
- The Assumption of the Virgin.
