= Giovanni Niccolò =

Italian painter

Giovanni Niccolò (also Giovanni Nicolao; Nola, 1560 – Macau, 16 March 1626) was a Jesuit Italian painter who in 1583 was sent to found a seminary of painting, named the Seminary of Painters, in Japan. This painter's name was Giovanni Colla. He has become known as Giovanni Niccolò, but this is an error.

Alessandro Valignano, one of the first Jesuit missionaries sent to Japan with Francis Xavier, who, with Ignatius Loyola later became the first canonised Jesuit saints, appreciated that art communicated where languages often could not. In a desire to both educate and provide Christian art to new converts, Valignano wrote to Rome requesting an accomplished Christian artist who could both produce art for his mission as well as teach students. Giovanni Colla arrived in Japan in 1583 "and began to train students, including Watano Mâncio, Mâncio João and Pedro João. The Seminario dei Pittori, or Painting School, was officially established in Kumamoto around 1590". The Painting School's students included not only Japanese, but also Europeans and Chinese who were taught a variety of techniques ranging from oil to watercolours. Examples of its students' works were shipped to Rome as proof of its success.

The school would become the largest school of Western painting in Asia. While there, Colla also created devotional objects for use by Japanese Catholic churches and converts. His preferred images were primarily the Salvator Mundi and Madonna. No known works remain that can be positively attributed to Giovanni Colla, although a tentative identification of an oil sketch of the Virgin and Child currently in an Osaka collection has been made.

Although the school had to relocate several times to avoid persecution, it was eventually exiled from Japan less than three decades later when the last missionaries were expelled from Japan in 1614. Several of the school's students fled to Macau, where they contributed to St. Paul's Cathedral, while some were sent to China to assist Matteo Ricci. These included Emmanuele Pereira (1572–1630, the artist of the only picture known of Matteo Ricci painted by someone who had known and seen him) and Ni Yagu (1579–1638, who painted two large altarpieces for Saint Paul's church in Macau in 1601), who became famous in their own right.
