= Landfermann-Gymnasium =

Grammar school in Duisburg, Germany

Coordinates: 51°26′03″N 6°46′25″E

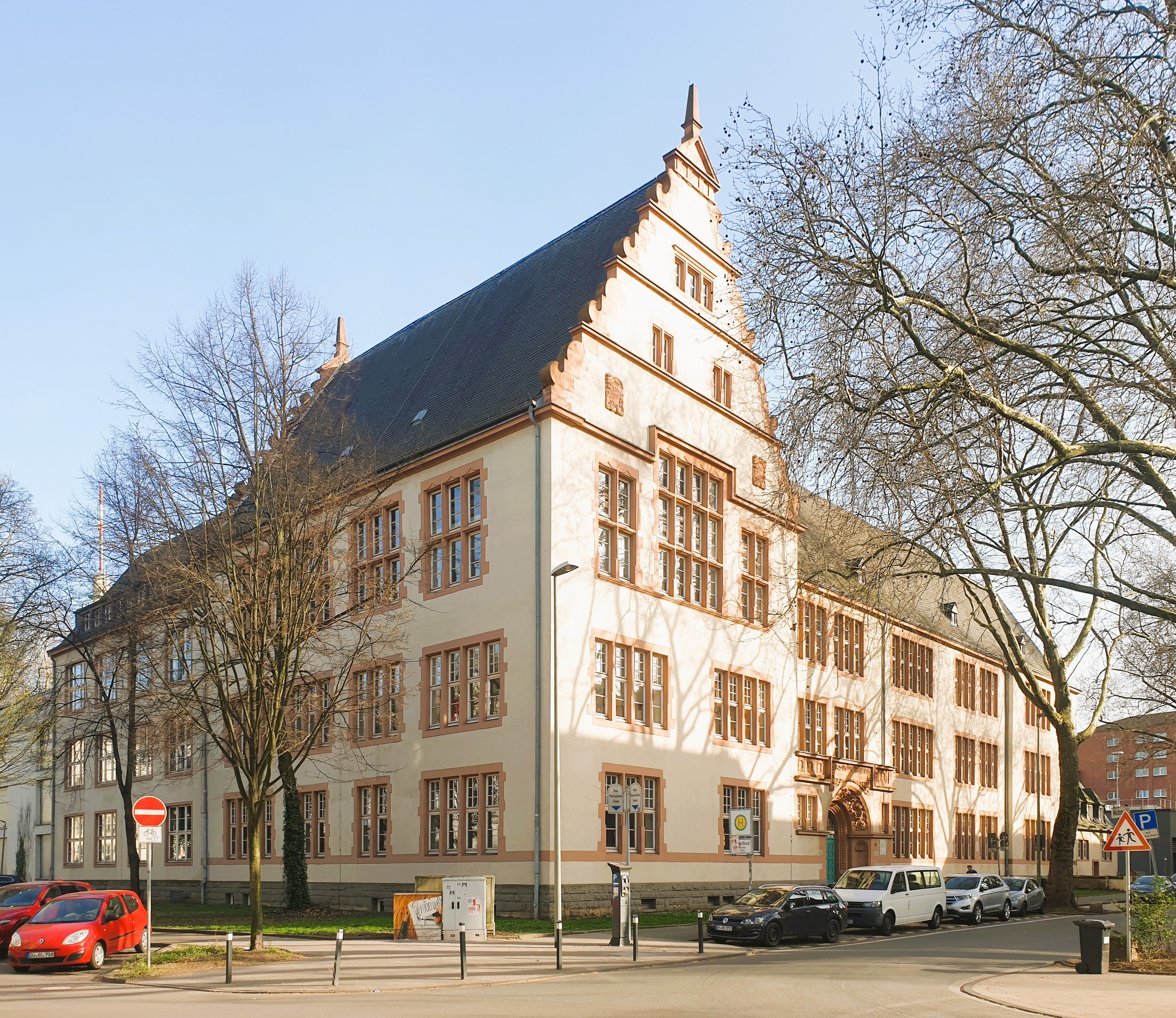
The Landfermann-Gymnasium

Landfermann-Gymnasium (LfG) is situated in the city centre of Duisburg, Germany. It is a municipal grammar school for boys and girls, and is one of the oldest schools in Germany.

Founded before 1280, it was known as Schola Duisburgensis, the school was transformed into a Latin school in 1559, which today's Landfermann-Gymnasium acknowledges as its official founding year. In 1925, it was renamed after Dietrich Wilhelm Landfermann (1800–1882), who was head of the school from 1835 to 1841.

== See also ==
- 10425 Landfermann, minor planet
