= Johann Wilhelm Ebel =

German Lutheran pastor

Johann Wilhelm Ebel (1784–1861) was a German Lutheran clergyman and teacher.

Ebel was born in Passenheim (Pasym), East Prussia, becoming a pastor in Königsberg. He was one of the founders of the Mucker Society, a group with pronounced similarities to earlier Gnostic groups. Ebel and the society were tried on a variety of charges relating to morality, all of which were dismissed after a six-year trial. He died in 1861.
