= Pieckowo =

- Pötschendorf in the 1900s, showing the palace, school building (1907), the rail station (1908) and the lake

- Location within Poland
- Coordinates: 54°02′49″N 21°15′03″E
- Country: Poland
- Voivodeship: Warmian-Masurian
- Powiat: Kętrzyn
- sołectwo: Pieckowo
- Established: 1448
- Elevation: 129 m (423 ft)
- Population (2021): 266
- Time zone: UTC+1 (CET)
  - Summer (DST): UTC+2 (CEST)
- Postal code: 11-440
- Area code: +48 89
- Car Plates: NKE
- Website: http://www.pieckowo.pl

Pieckowo [pjɛt͡sˈkɔvɔ] is a village in north-east Poland. It is located in Warmian-Masurian Voivodship in Kętrzyn County in Reszel Commune.

== History ==
The Pötschendorf was founded at 1448 in the monastic state of the Teutonic Knights.

== Population ==
The population of Pieckowo is about 266 (2021).

Year	1818	1910	1933	1939	2004	2021
Population	185	461	564	521	283	266

== Lake ==
In Pieckowo, there is a small lake named Jezioro Pieckowskie. It has an area of 18.9 ha (46.7 acres).
