= Rudolf Reicke =

German historian and scholar (1825–1905)

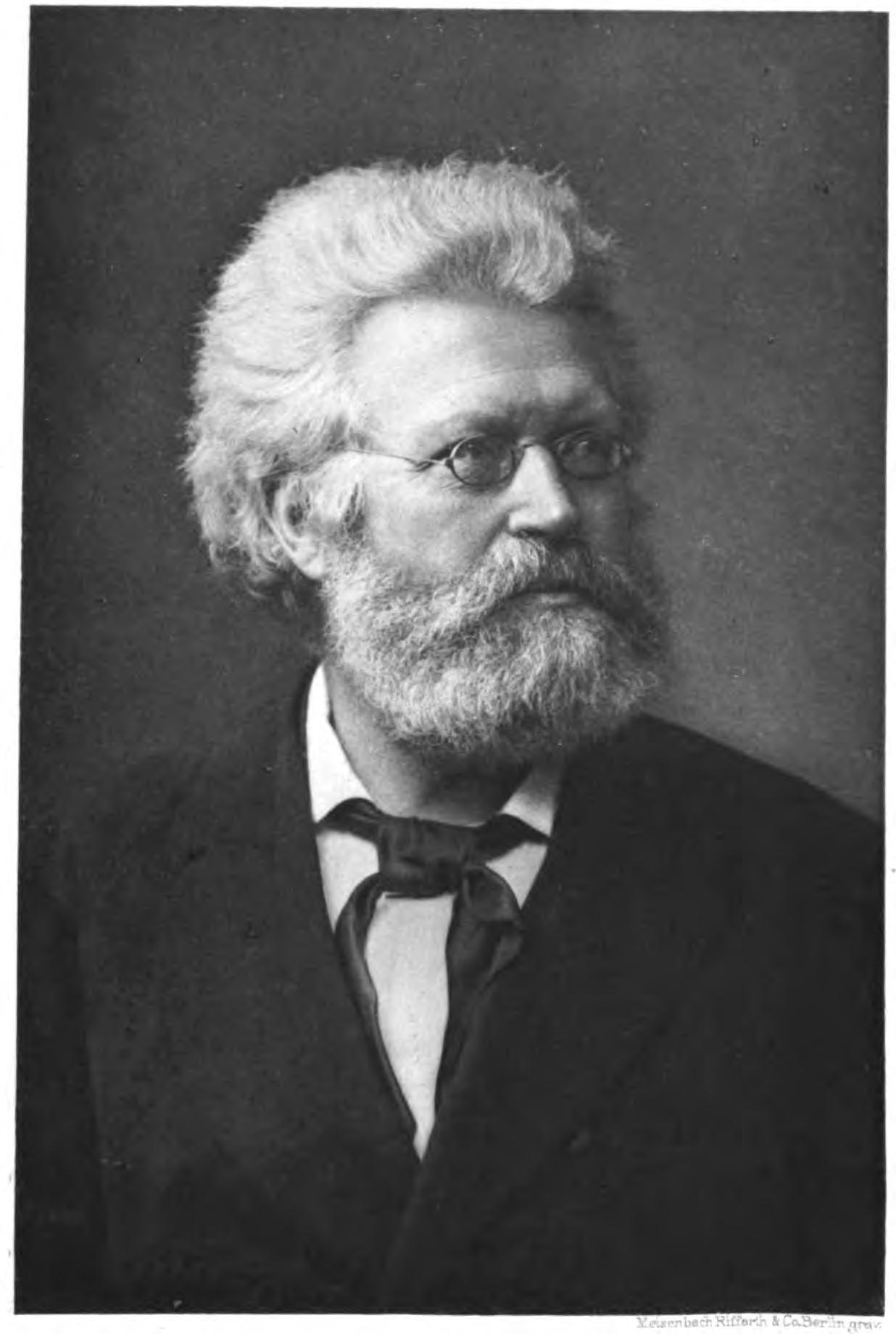
- Born: February 5, 1825; Memel, East Prussia
- Died: October 16, 1905 (aged 80); Königsberg, East Prussia
- Children: Georg Reicke; Emil Reicke

Academic background
- Education: University of Königsberg
- Influences: Karl Rosenkranz, Friedrich Wilhelm Schubert

Academic work
- Discipline: History
- Main interests: Immanuel Kant

Rudolf Reicke (5 February 1825 – 16 October 1905) was a German historian and scholar of Immanuel Kant.

From 1847 to 1852 he studied at the University of Königsberg, where his influences included Karl Rosenkranz and Friedrich Wilhelm Schubert. From 1858 he was associated with the university library and was named head librarian in 1894. In 1864, he founded the Altpreußische Monatsschrift, a journal for "Kantiana".

== Literary works ==
- Kantiana : Beiträge zu Immanuel Kants Leben und Schriften [English: Kantiana : Contributions to Immanuel Kant's life and writings] (1860)
- Lose blätter aus Kants nachlass [English: Papers from Kant's Nachlass] (3 volumes, 1889–1898)
