= Friedrich Wilhelm Schubert =

German historian (1799–1868)

Friedrich Wilhelm Schubert (20 May 1799 in Königsberg – 21 July 1868 in Königsberg) was a German historian.

He studied at the universities of Königsberg and Berlin, becoming an associate professor at Königsberg in 1823. In 1826 he was named a full professor of medieval and modern history and of constitutional law at the university.

He was a member of the Frankfurt National Assembly and Erfurt Union Parliament. He held a seat in the Prussian Lower Chamber (1849–52, 1858–63) and from 1864 onward, represented the University of Königsberg at the Prussian House of Lords.

== Published works ==
With Karl Rosenkranz, he edited the works of Immanuel Kant, Immanuel Kant's Sämmtliche Werke (12 volumes, 1838–42). Among his other writings are the following:

- Handbuch der Allgemeinen Staatskunde von Europa (2 volumes, 1835–48) – Handbook on general citizenship of Europe.
- Die Verfassungsurkunden und Grundgesetze der Staaten Europa's, der Nordamerikanischen Freistaaten und Brasiliens (2 volumes, 1848) – The constitutional and principal laws of the states of Europe, the North American Free States and Brazil.
