= Heinrich Zell =

German printer and cartographer

Heinrich Zell (died after 1560) was a German printer and cartographer. He was a student of Sebastian Münster.

Accompanying Rheticus to Prussia, Heinrich Zell in collaboration with Nicolaus Copernicus, produced the first geostatic map of the Prussian coastline and had the first printed map of Prussia with hundreds of towns printed in 1542. Zell incorporated Ermland (Warmia) records of Prussian towns in this detailed and until then unaccomplished task.

== Works ==
- Heinrich Zell, Prussiae descriptio, Coloniae, 1594, Staatsbibliothek Preußischer Kulturbesitz, Berlin (printed after the original from 1542 in the St. Mark's Library in Venice)
- printed map of Brandenburg, 1550
