= Sapiranga =

City in Brazil

Coordinates: 29°38′S 51°00′W

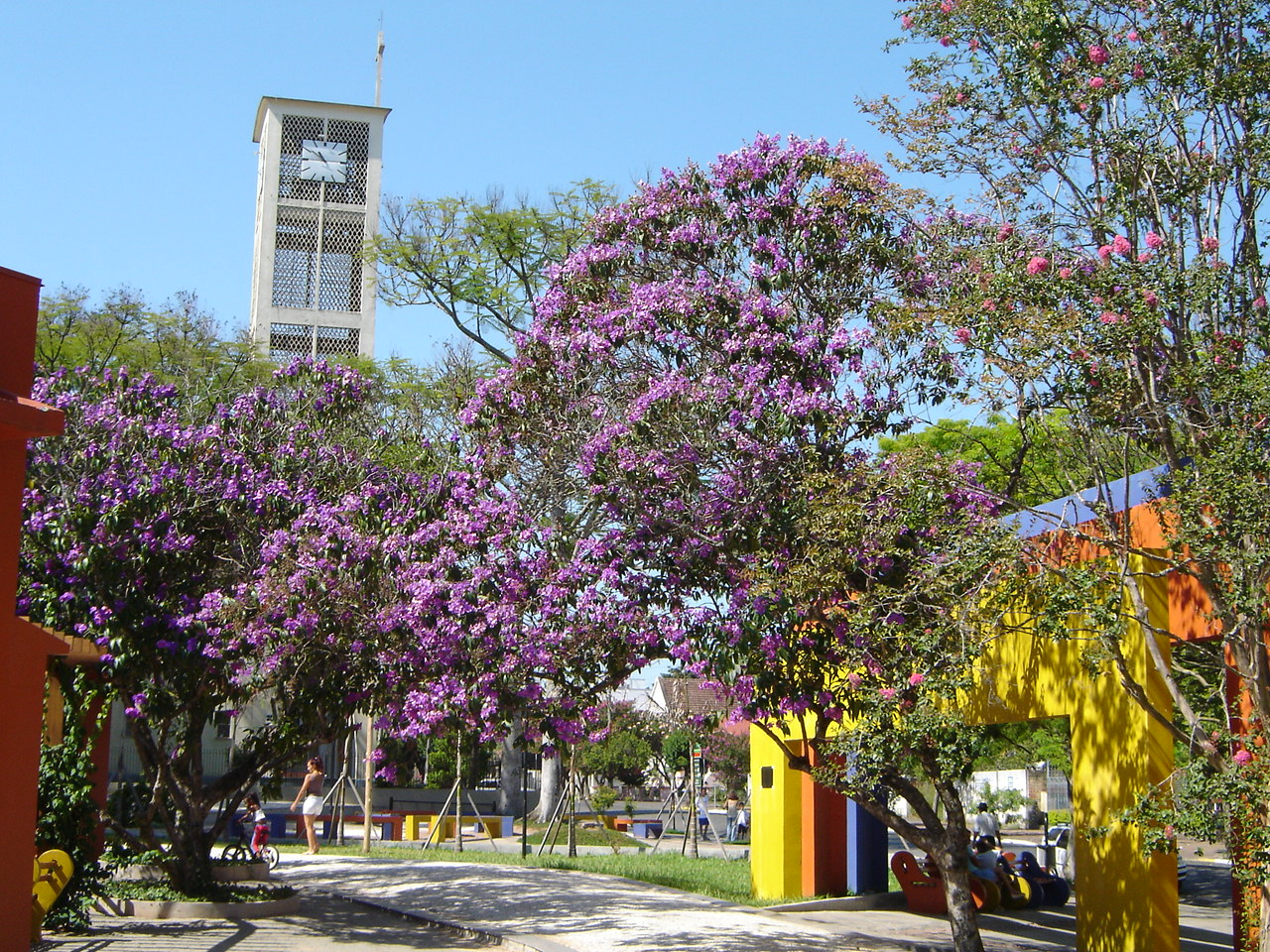

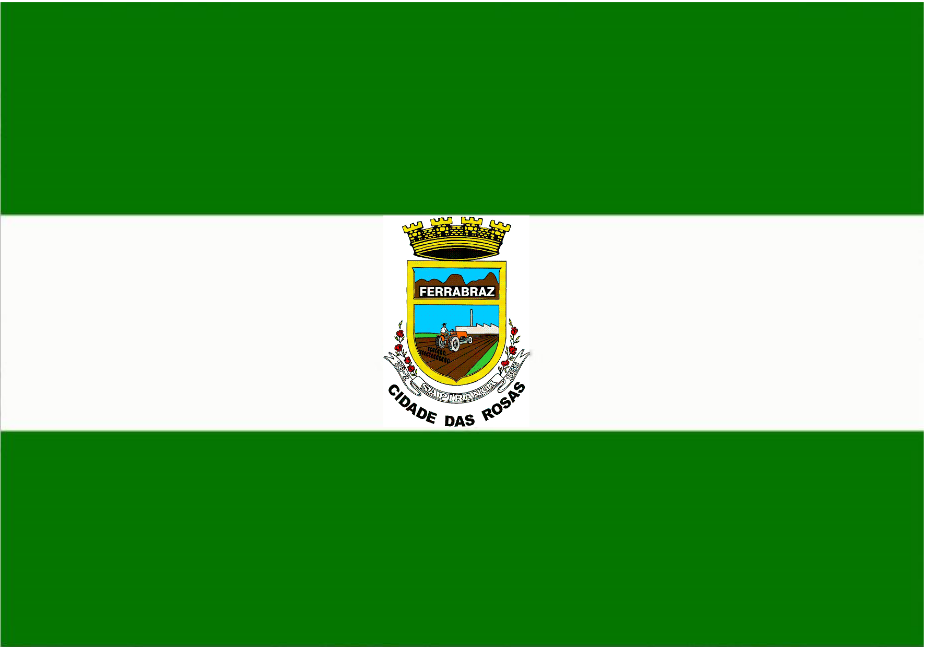
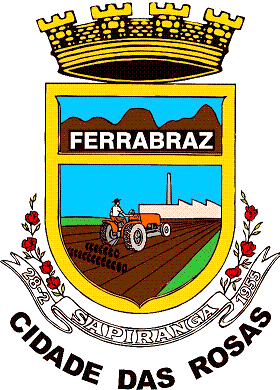
- Flag Coat of arms

- Location in Rio Grande do Sul, Brazil
- Country: Brazil
- Region: South
- State: Rio Grande do Sul
- Founded: 1955

Government
  - Mayor: Corinha Molling (PP)

Area
  - Total: 137.519 km^{2} (53.096 sq mi)

Population (2020)
  - Total: 75.613
  - Density: 538/km^{2} (1,390/sq mi)
- Time zone: UTC−3 (BRT)
- Website: Prefeitura de Sapiranga

Sapiranga is a city in Brazil in the state of Rio Grande do Sul with a population of roughly 80,000 inhabitants. It is located in an industrial area called "Vale dos Sinos", by the Rio dos Sinos (River of the Bells). The town's economy relies heavily on the shoe industry. Other industries are present, but mostly linked to the shoe manufacturing process, such as metallurgic plants in which machinery is built to later be employed in the production of shoes.

Sapiranga is 59 km (37 mi) away from Porto Alegre. The city's area is 137.5 km^{2} (53 sq mi).

Sapiranga is known as the "City of the Roses". Sapiranga's Festival of Roses originated with simple competitions to see who had the best gardens or bouquets of roses. Today, it has grown into a large festival with music, dancing, and roses. It takes place each November in the Immigrant Park.

== Ferrabraz Hills ==
From the peak of Ferrabraz there are views of the surrounding peaks, Sapiranga and its neighboring cities below. On a clear day it is possible to see the buildings and the lights of Porto Alegre. Ferrabraz attracts tourists through its walking trails, history, hidden waterfalls, historical monuments, and to participate in hang gliding, paragliding, hiking, cross country and downhill mountain biking, rappelling, and motocross.

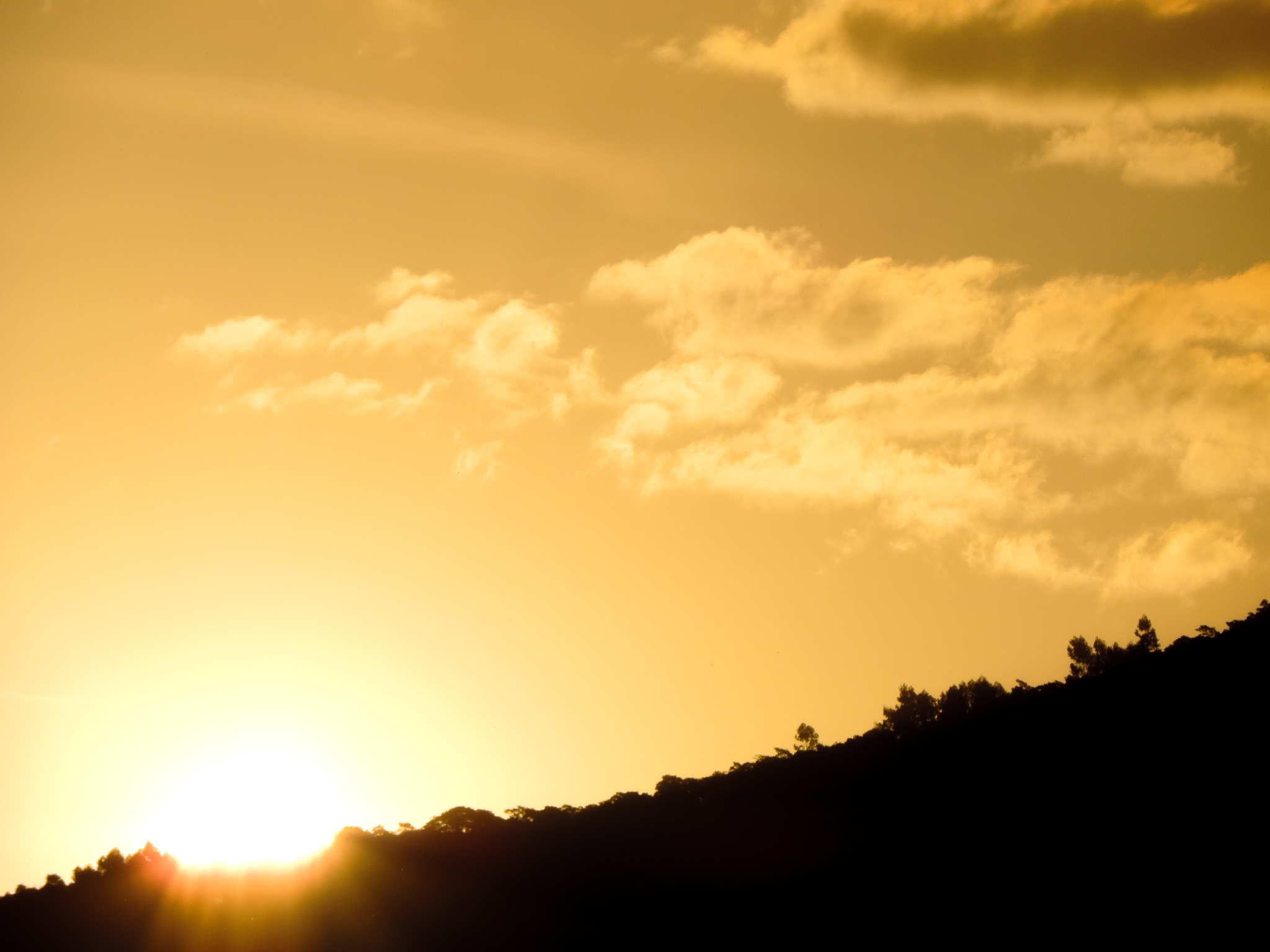
Sunset at Ferrabraz

The Ferrabraz is a reference of Sapiranga, being featured in the city's coat of arms. The sunset on the hill attracts dozens of people. In the second half of the 19th century, Ferrabraz was marked by the battle of the Muckers, which happened in its foothills. This same area is where, today, is the historical site of the Muckers marked by the route Caminhos de Jacobina.

== Sports ==
The town has a soccer team: Associação Esportiva Sapiranga.

== See also ==
- List of municipalities in Rio Grande do Sul
