= Techno-animism =

Concept linking technology with animacy

Techno-animism or technoanimism is a term used in several scholarly contexts for relations between technology and animacy, agency, or spiritual qualities. In studies of Japanese popular culture and robotics, it has described both an aesthetic in which machines and commodities are treated as animate and a discourse that connects attitudes toward robots with animism or Shinto. The claim that these relations express a stable or uniquely Japanese cultural tradition is disputed; critics instead analyze techno-animism through consumer capitalism, robotics design, nation branding, and situated human–technology interaction.

While this term is nowadays seen often in relation to Japanese studies, R. George Kirkpatrick and Diana Tumminia first used it in a 1992 study of Unarius, an American UFO religion. In 2001, Okuno Takuji applied the Japanese rendering tekuno animizumu to contemporary robots. That year, Dutch sociologist Stef Aupers used technoanimists for computer specialists who treated digital technology as an intelligent and autonomous force. Later work has also applied techno-animism to DIY and maker practices.

== Background and history ==
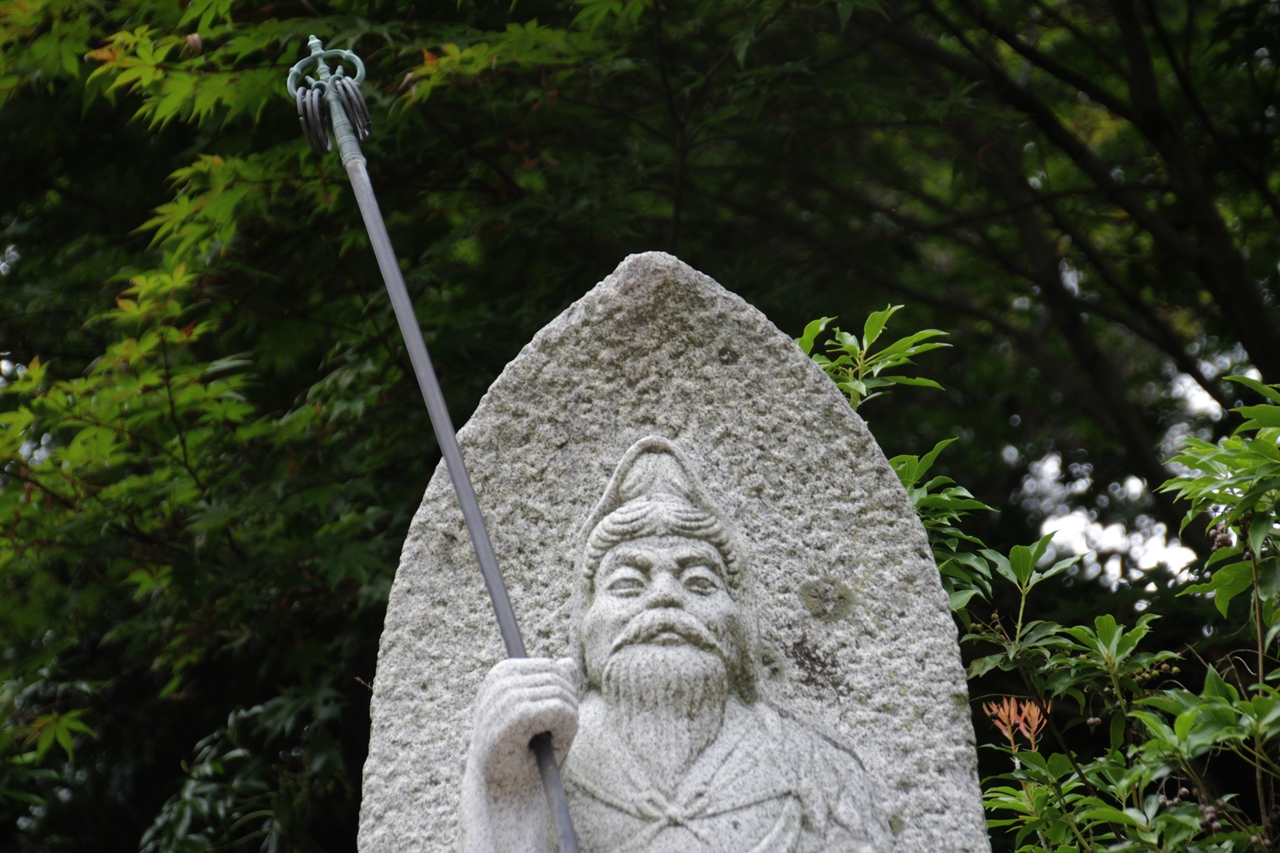
The deity of roads and borders represented in a human form.

The practice of instilling human and spiritual characteristics into physical objects has always been part of the Shinto religion. Deities in the Shinto religion often symbolize objects of the physical world and their statues often take human forms. With these practices, people form tighter bonds with physical objects. In Japanese culture, the interaction between humans and non-human objects is critical to the harmonious coexistence of humans and nature. A prime example of this type of interaction is that before meals, Japanese people always say "itadakimasu" which expresses gratitude for the ingredients of the meal may it be animals or plants.

Techno-animism builds upon the practices of the Shinto religion by instilling human and spiritual characteristics into technology. As for representation, techno-animism is often embodied in the engineering design of objects and the way that people interact with those objects. In a larger social context, Techno-animism provides a means for technology to be integrated into the human society because new technology can always be instilled with traditional values.

Examples of Techno-animism also exist within the context of the DIY ethic and Maker culture: linking contemporary theories of material agency and Material culture with post-modern ideas of Animism and ethnographies " with recent academic studies suggesting that a form of Techno-animism can be observed in the highly developed practices of material engagement present in certain Do it yourself sub-cultures recorded in contemporary ethnographic studies of technology.

=== Critiques and relational approaches ===
Okuno Takuji's tekuno animizumu formulation was extended from Japan to East Asia more broadly. This was criticized as techno-Orientalist because it treated animism as an enduring regional disposition. Techno-animism in Japan has also been explained as a continuity between Shinto cosmologies and technological culture. In Jensen-Blok's account, Shinto cosmograms and actor–network theory offer comparable ways of describing non-human agency. This comparison risks treating diverse human–technology relations as expressions of a generalized Japanese belief in animism. It also locates animation in cultural belief rather than in the practices that produce relations with particular things.

== Examples ==
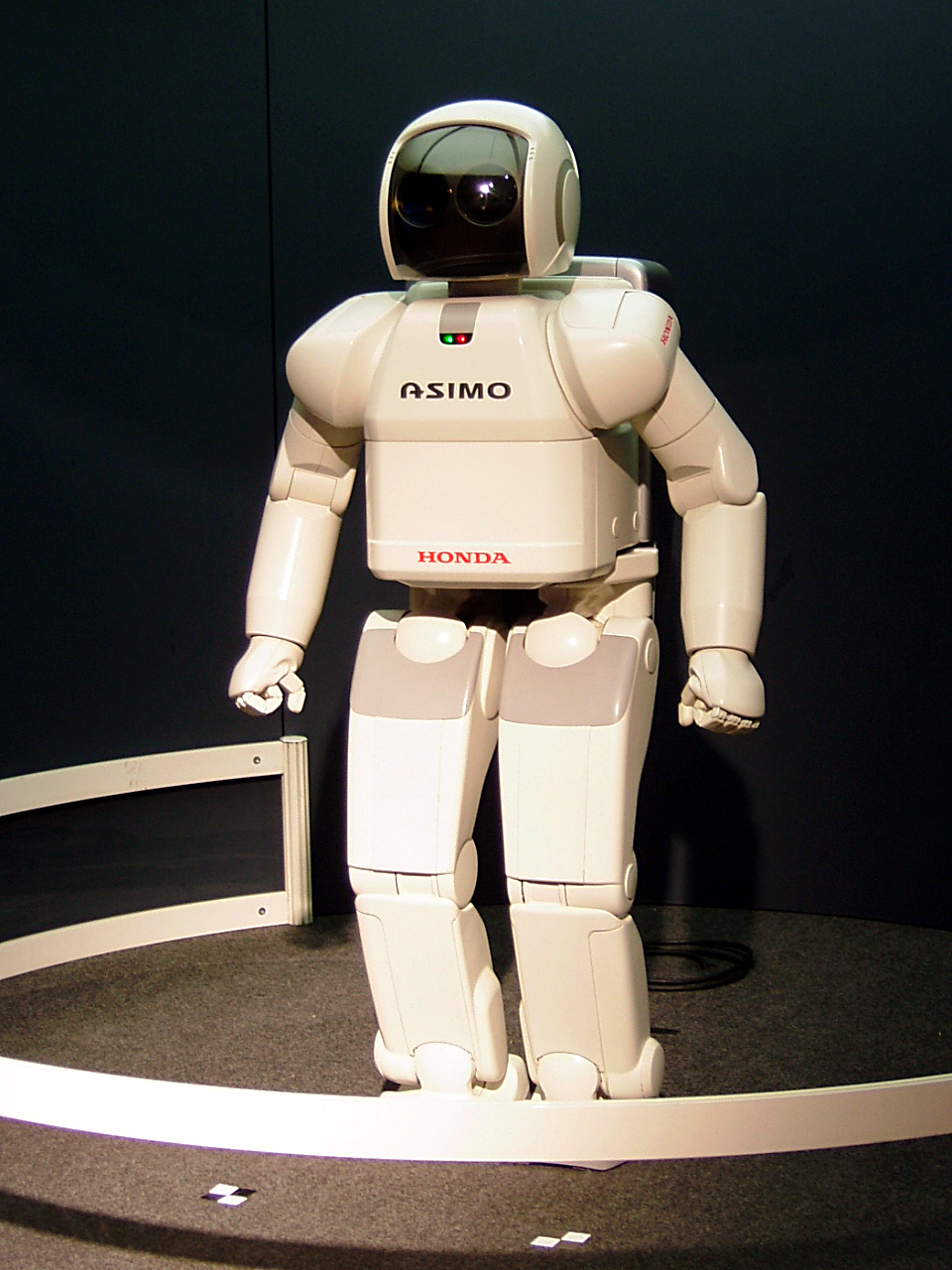
A humanoid robot designed by Honda

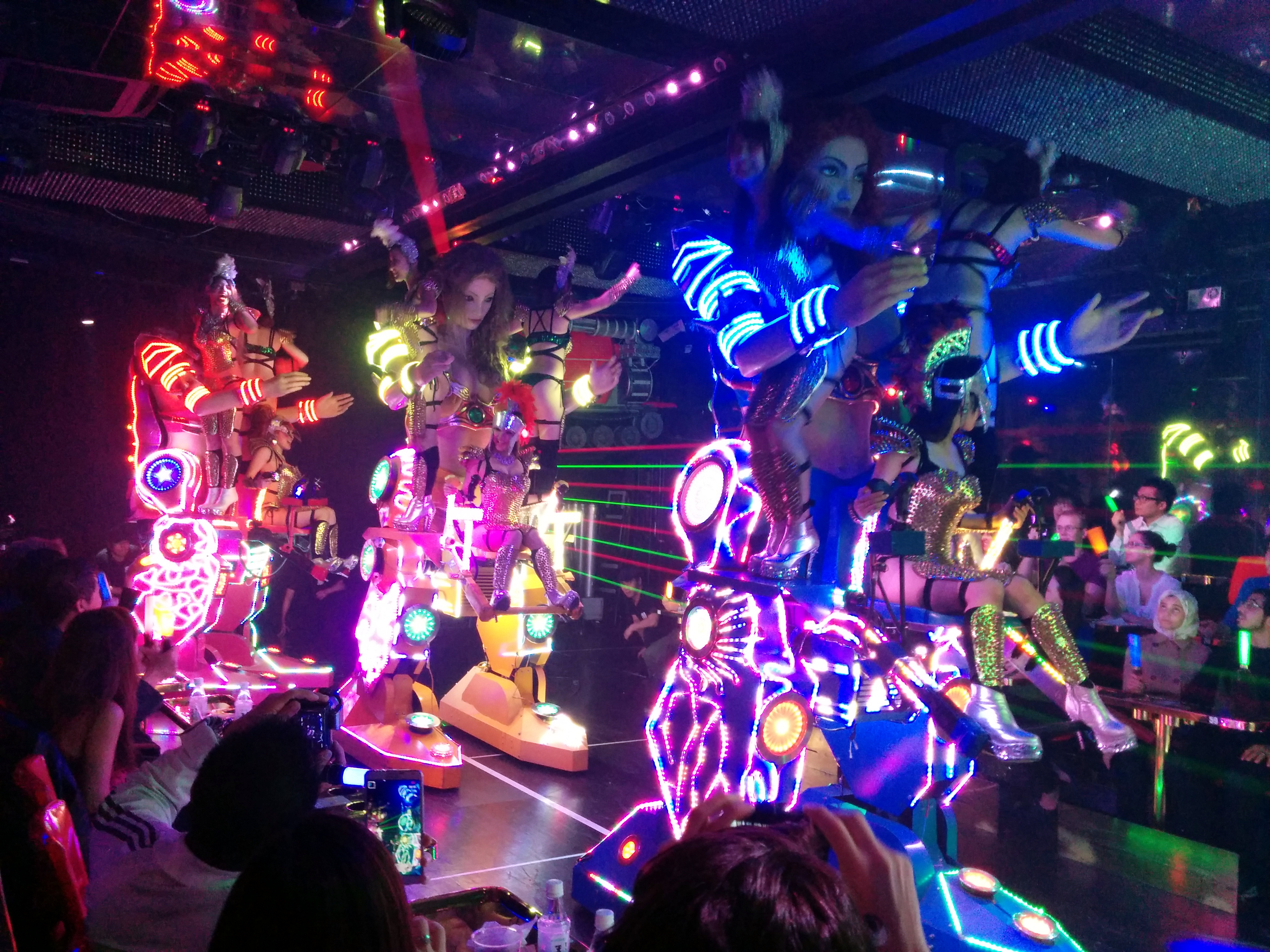
Robots "dancing" and "singing" at a show

The design of certain objects can have human-related traits that illustrate techno-animism. A robot designed by Honda called ASIMO takes the form of an astronaut wearing a spacesuit. The form factor along with the spiritual values associated with space exploration makes ASIMO an embodiment of techno-animism. In addition, ASIMO can also communicate with humans through language and gestures. Communication is a defining factor of determining whether something is an individual being or not. In Japan, the robot industry offers a wide range of functions from talking robots to sex robots. Conversation and sexual relationships used to be concepts that only belonged to humans. However, technological advancements and techno-animism are breaking down that barrier with engineering designs that embody human and spiritual characteristics.

Beyond the design of objects, the way that people choose to interact with objects could also demonstrate techno-animism. In Shinjuku, Tokyo, a restaurant has robots for waiters instead of humans. Rather than talking to another person, customers interact with machines during their meals. In this process, customers accept the fact that technology has become part of the human society and has a unique way of interacting with humans.

== Social implications ==
Japanese culture and legislation are generally supportive of the techno-animism trend. Considering that Japan's modernization took place during a relatively short period compared to western nations, techno-animism is seen as a major reason why Japan has been a leader in technological innovations. As a result, acceptance of techno-animism is the current attitude in Japan, both culturally and legislatively.

== See also ==
- Digital empathy
- Digital sublime
- Twipsy
