= Digital sublime =

Philosophical concept

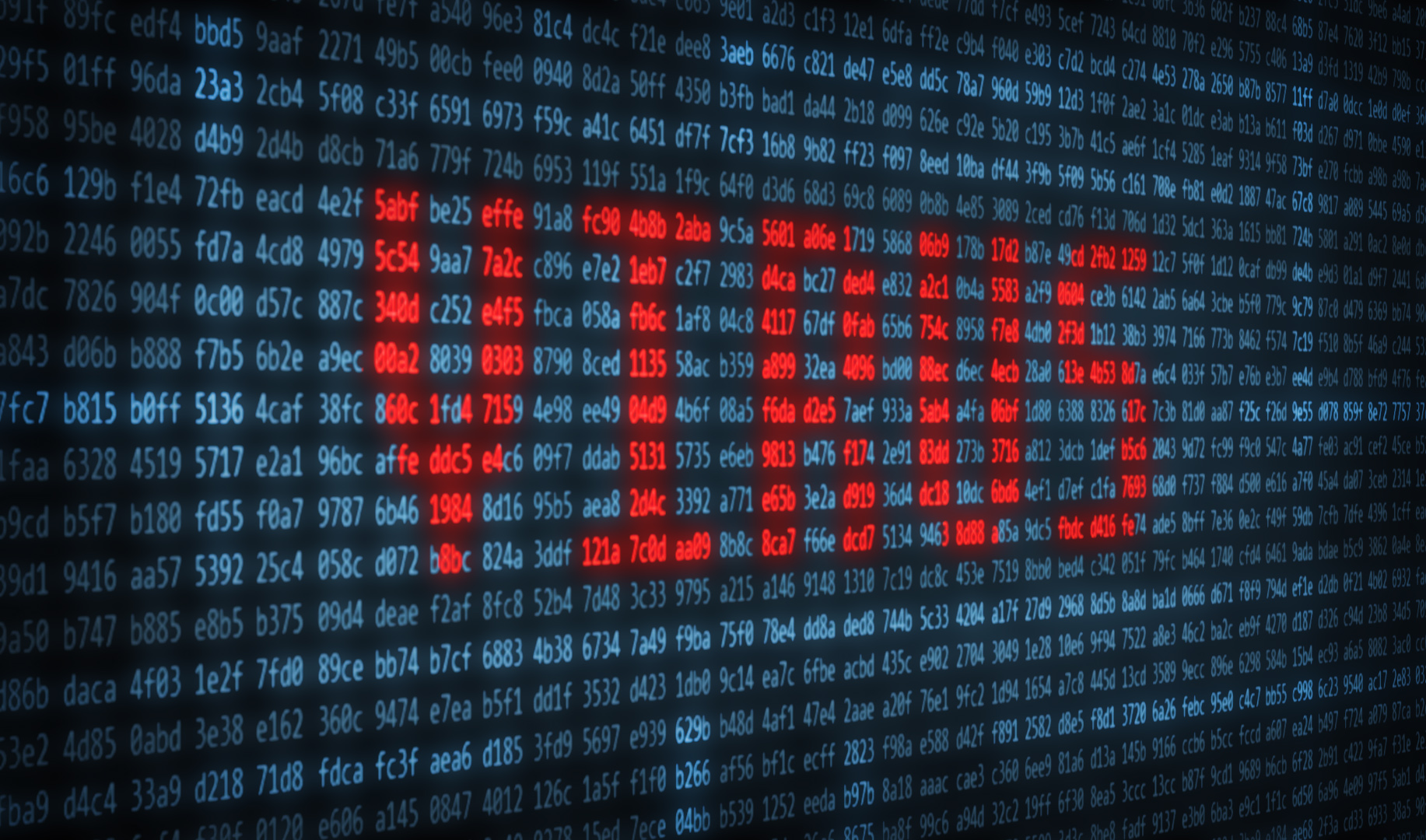
Artistic depiction of computer virus

The digital sublime is the mythologization of the impact of computers and cyberspace on human experiences of time, space and power. It is also known as cyber sublime or algorithmic sublime. It is a philosophical conception of emotions that captivate the collective conscience with the emergence of these new technologies and the promises and predictions that emerge from them. These emotions are the awe, the astonishment, the rationality-subsuming glory, and the generally intense spiritual experience.

This feeling is essentially provoked by intentionally black-boxed algorithms or by the lack of knowledge about algorithms. The sublime can be either utopian or dystopian depending on the individual's interpretation of their emotional response. The utopian interpretation of the digital sublime is known as digital utopianism and the dystopian is referred to as digital dystopia.

== Classical notion of the sublime ==
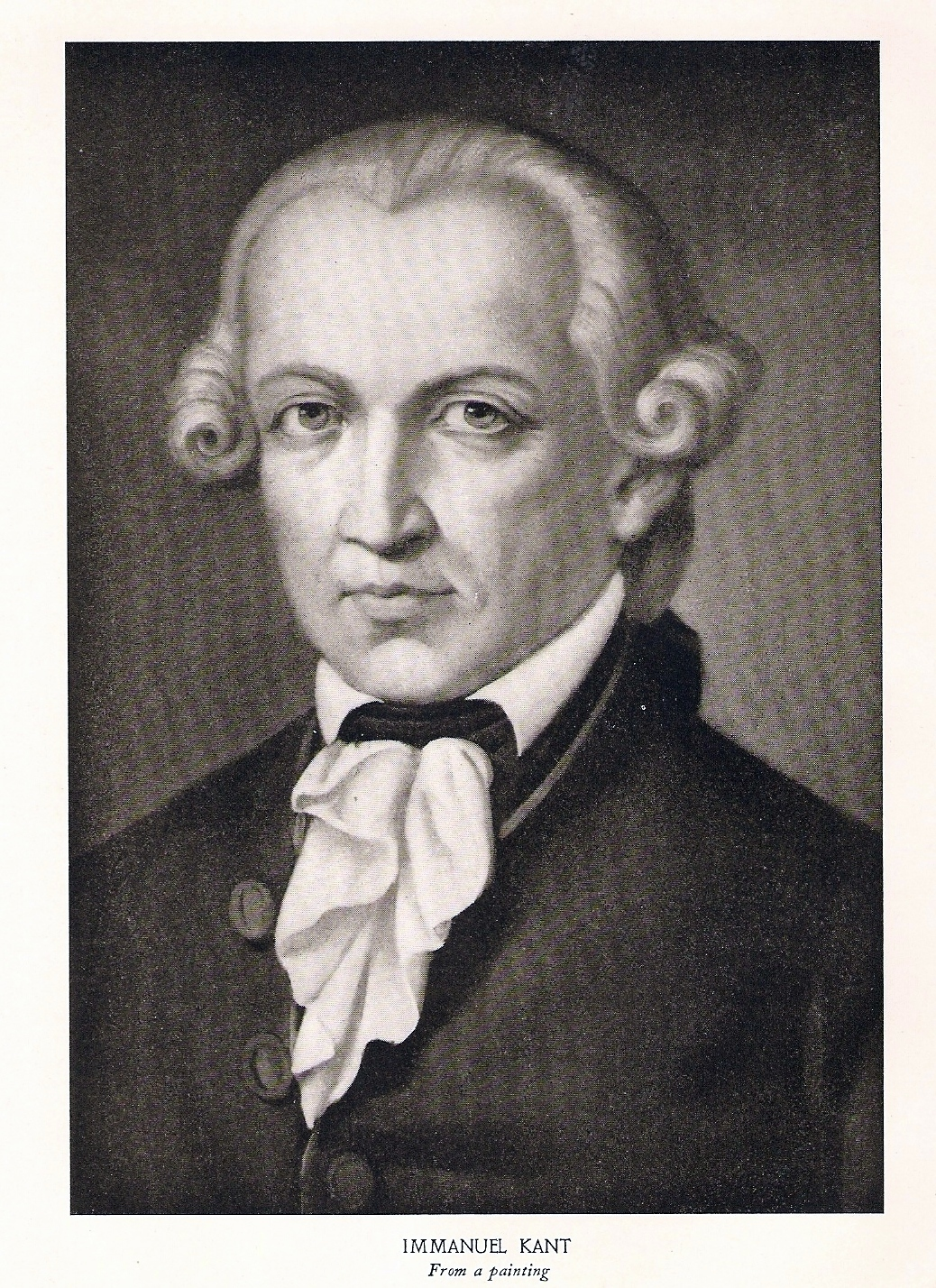
Immanuel Kant

The classical notion of the sublime was fathered by Immanuel Kant in his work Observations on the Feeling of the Beautiful and Sublime (1764). He defined the Sublime in his piece Critique of Judgment (1790) as:

"an object (of nature) the presentation of which determines the mind to think of nature's inability to attain to an exhibition of ideas."

The nature of the classical sublime according to Kant was the sensation produced in the individual when confronted with something that:

1. Was beyond the realms of the mind's comprehension
2. Overawed the imagination

The result was an overwhelming sense of empowerment at being able to stand before such a spectacle and exhilaration at how fragile a person is in the face of such tremendous power and immensity. Examples for Kant were standing before a mountain or overlooking the raging sea.

Edmund Burke's (1756) work, "Philosophical Enquiry into the Origin of Our Ideas of the Sublime and Beautiful" is another contributor to this classical notion, written at a similar time to Kant. For him, the sublime emerges from the terrible or that which invokes terror.

== Origins of the digital sublime ==
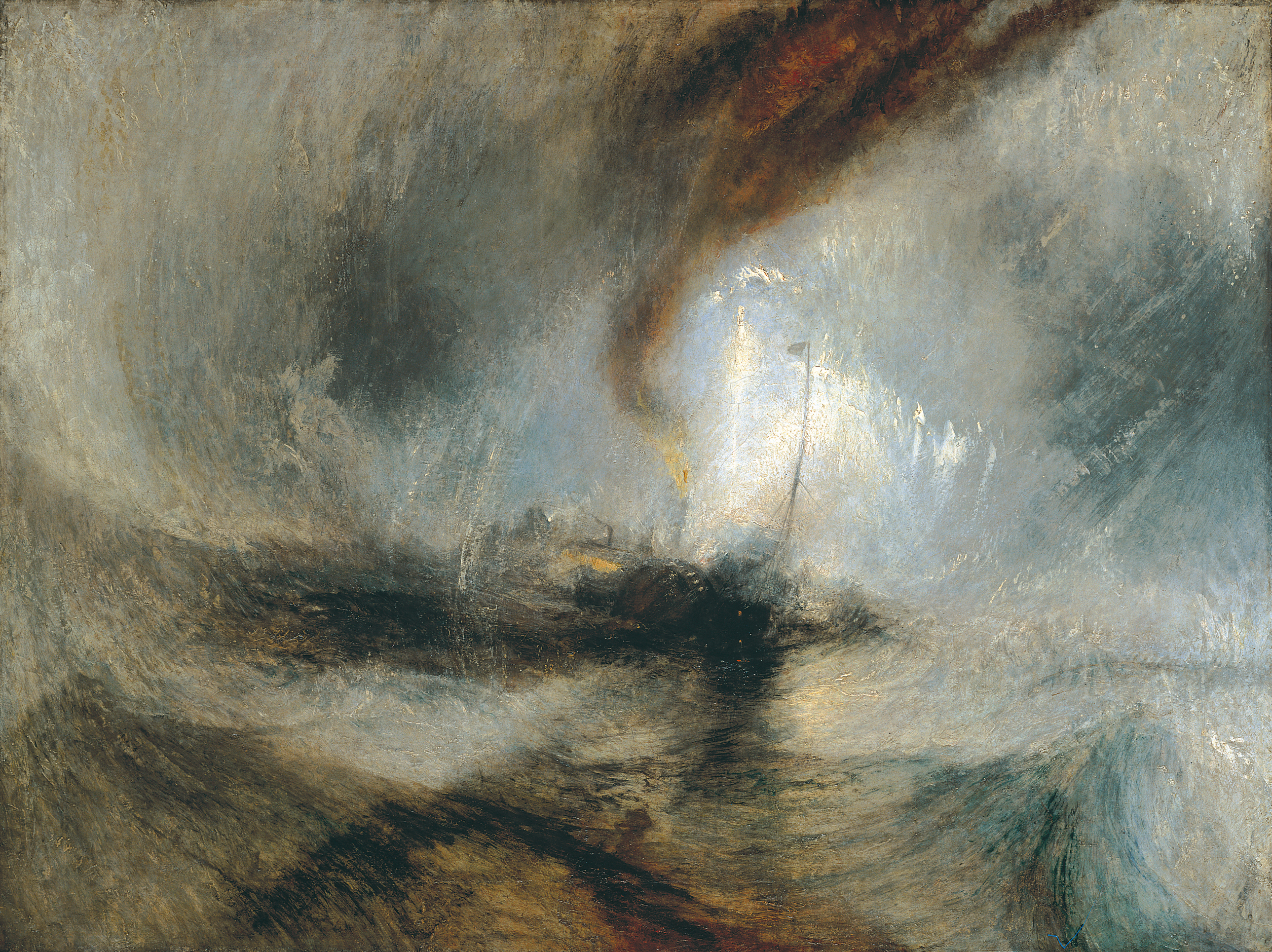
Example of Sublime Art - Steam Boat off a Harbour's Mouth by J. M. W. Turner

Vincent Mosco was one of the leading thinkers in the development and distinction of the digital sublime as a highly respected academic amongst the international community and was a professor at Queen's University in Canada. His seminal work "The Digital Sublime: Myth, Power, and Cyberspace" explains that the digital sublime did not have a definite beginning. However, he outlines how it emerged as a progression from the technological sublime, which was the beginning of a shift in conceptions of the sublime connected to the industrial revolutions of the late 19th century and early 20th Century. Inventions such as the railroad, electricity, the radio, and the aeroplane all captivated the collective conscience in the possibility of ushering in a global village.

Mosco argues that there has not been a significant change in our approach to the appearance of new technologies, with the same prophecies of revolutionizing the human experience of time, space and power, even to the extent of ending world conflict. Mosco identifies these same promises heralded by Computers and Cyberspace. The digital revolution and information revolution are captivating the imagination and attention of global onlookers in an almost identical fashion.

Skowronska, an emerging academic from the University of Sydney and contemporary artist, proposes that it was with the emergence of new technologies such as graphics cards for video games, open source programs, three dimensional computer processing engines, the digital video screen and others opened up whole new possibilities of virtuality as a creative tool. She proposes that it was in the ability of these technologies to represent the invisible that truly distinguished the digital sublime from its classical notion and that it did so "through a virtual channel of mathematical coding, or algorithms, that act as correlates for this invisible world, translating it into a visual field perceptible by human optics".

== Artistic expression ==
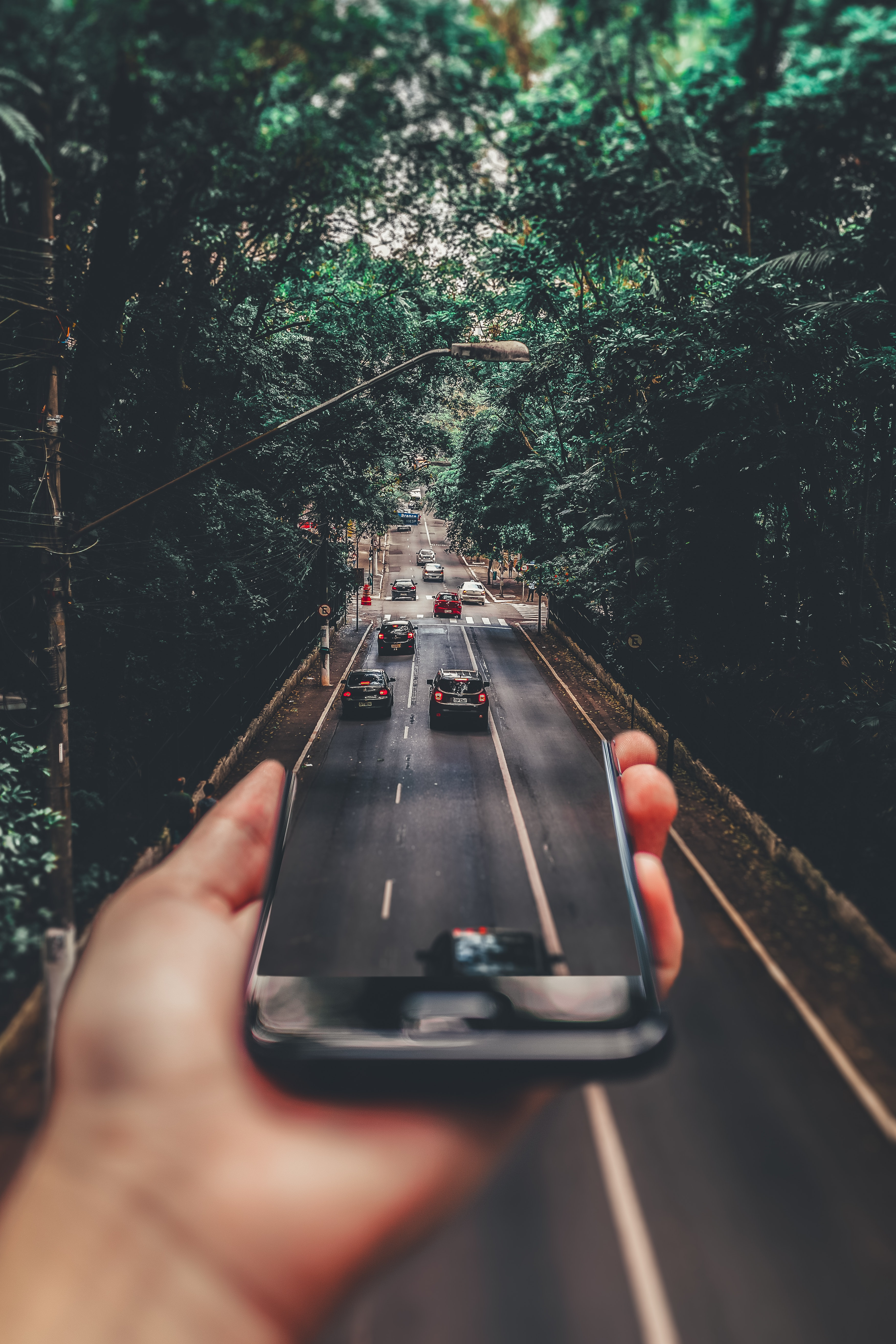
Example of composite photograph

The classical notion of the sublime has been represented by various artists such as J. M. W. Turner drawing on the inspiration described by both Kant and Burke: the natural world.

Artwork on the digital sublime has now emerged attempting to capture our awe and excitement around Big Data, New Media and Web 2.0. Huang proposes that the digital sublime in artistic expression is the representation of something unpresentable. A prime example of this is digital composite-photography which involves stitching photographs together to create images that would not be possible without recent technology in order to conceptualise complex ideas through image.

Skowronska, however, associates the digital sublime in art as a move away from the massive to the minutiae. She proposes that the representation of what is not physically perceptible to the eye, but that has a representation in the virtual facilitated by new technology is the distinctive mark of this art form. She has done significant work of her own in this field as well as developing the digital sublime conceptually through her thesis. Her individual work focuses on the manipulation, projection and representation of data through different digital forms.

== Criticisms ==
The digital sublime, for some theorists, is not only unhelpful in understanding and engaging with new technology, but they believe that Mosco's myths inhibit and endanger cyberculture in a way that Burkart likens to the endangerment of biodiversity. Such theorists argue that the digital sublime blinds users to the risks and vulnerabilities of cyberspace.

=== The digital sublime and political economy ===
The Digital Sublime has been taken by media theorists to obscure and obfuscate the interworking of Web 2.0. Media theorists have worked to critically analyse and evaluate the processes, algorithms, and functions behind the user interface in order to unveil the driving forces of development and updates online. Political economic theorists have proposed that the myths espoused by the digital sublime of the internet providing a faultless user experience providing everything desired at the user's fingertips are inaccurate. Underneath the surface, business owners are manipulating the infrastructure and digital architecture of platforms in order create the most profit.

=== The digital sublime and the music industry ===
The digital sublime has seemingly encouraged the narrative that streaming services and cloud based storage will lead to unprecedented freedom and access music. While it is true that our physical limitations in access to music content has been reduced to the requirement of having an electronic device with internet connection, the truthfulness of this emancipation has been brought under scrutiny.

Patrick Burkart proposes that the emancipation of content is limited to that of the mobilisation of content. As opposed to freeing up content, access is still limited by algorithms giving preference to more popular content and consequently further obscuring the greater diversity of content that is actually available. Instead, he argues that it is those who disrupt our perception of the seamless and all encompassing nature of music streaming services that reveal to us the technical and legal barriers that benefit content providers and are limiting, even shepherding, user experience so as to meet their goals. He sees pirates of media content as the key dissenters to this otherwise invisible vertical integration and that they are symptomatic of the fragility of cyber-communities.

== See also ==
- Cybernetic art
- Digital empathy
- Techno-animism
- Sublime (philosophy)
