= Tsang Lap Chuen =

Chinese philosopher

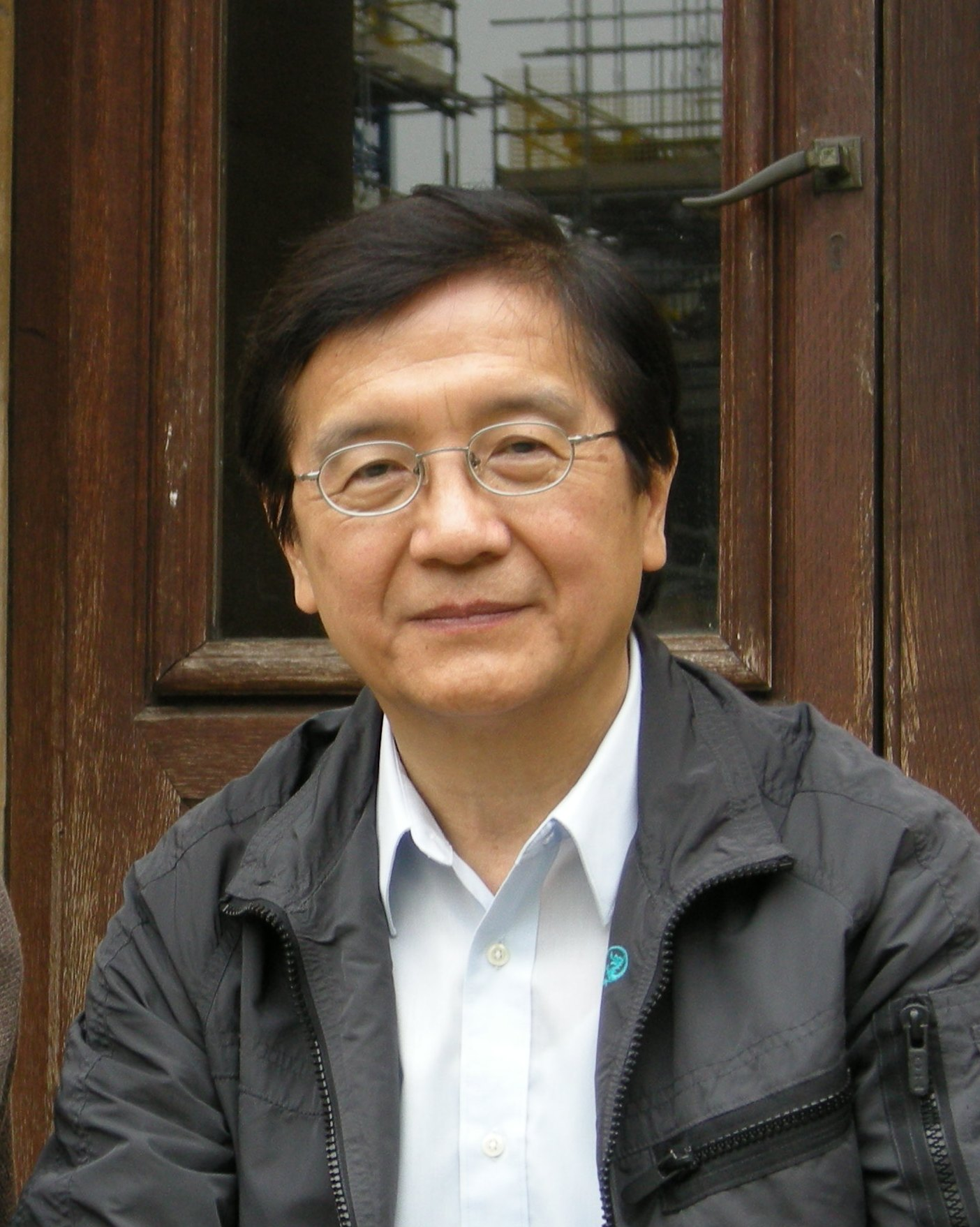
Tsang in Oxford in 2012

Tsang Lap Chuen (Chinese: 曾立存) (1943—) is a Chinese philosopher in the analytic tradition. He is known for his theory of the sublime in which he presents the notion of limit-situations in life as being central to the human experience.

== Personal life ==
Tsang was born in Wuhua County, Guangdong, China on 7 October 1943, the son of Tsang Kwok Ying (1906–1999), District Minister of Tsung Tsin Mission (formerly Basle Mission) of Hong Kong, and Wong Kun Tsing (1916–2014), a devout Christian committed to the church and family. They moved to Hong Kong when he was two years old. Today he and his wife Tse Wai Yee live in Hong Kong. They have two sons, Tze Yee and Tze Yan.

== Education and work ==
Tsang attended church-operated public schools before studying at the University of Hong Kong from 1963 to 1968, graduating with a B.A. in philosophy and modern languages and an M.A. in philosophy. From 1968 to 1970 he was a philosophy tutor at the Chinese University of Hong Kong. From 1969 to 1974, he continued his study at HKU for a PhD in philosophical method, which ended with his withdrawal due to gradual digression of his research interests. From 1975 until 2004, he was a faculty member in general education and religious studies at Hong Kong Baptist University; from 1978 to 1979, its exchange professor to Malone College, USA; and, from 1995 to 2000, head of its Department of Religion and Philosophy.

From 1985 to 1991 Tsang re-enrolled for the PhD program at HKU, this time in philosophy of religion, with the research topic of existential wonder. To place the topic in a historical context, his supervisor F.C.T. Moore introduced him to Kant's Critique of Judgment on the concept of the sublime. Eventually, he worked out a thesis on a new theory of the sublime in the tradition of Longinus, Burke and Kant, later published as The Sublime: Groundwork towards a Theory by the recommendation of Joseph A. Munitiz, then the Master of Campion Hall, Oxford.

== Theory of the Sublime ==
In the light of Wittgenstein on "language games", Lévi-Strauss on "ritual and myth" and Freud on "ideas and dreams", Tsang develops a conceptual framework of [i] construal, [ii] evocation, [iii] affectivity and [iv] instantiation, giving a coherent account of the elements that can be distinguished in the phenomenon of the sublime, with the event of the Crucifixion as an exemplary instance. In the experience of the sublime, Longinus emphasises our contemplation and thought reaching the limit of the natural order of grandeur; Burke our self-preservation in situations which defy our existing capacities; and Kant our transcendence of the natural order as supersensible beings. Each of them is concerned with an aspect of the sublime which Tsang characterises, in general terms, as that which transports us to a self-realization at the limit of our existence.

According to the theory Tsang proposes, the sublime is concerned with a limit-situation in life and our self-realization in it such that the core of all experience of the sublime is an intensified awareness of our self-realization at a life-limit. Life-limits are of three kinds, the top limit to our being which borders on that which transcends the natural and the human, the bottom limit to our being which borders on the non-existent, and the median limit which designates the bloom of our being in its domain. We come to an intensified awareness of our self-realization at a life-limit in our encounter with an object which is so construed that it elicits a set of thoughts and reactions pertaining to certain themes, including the limits of our powers and abilities, and the importance of being able to go up to or even beyond those limits.

The sublime is concerned with the notion of a limit to what can be said and thought and willed. The sublime is not an object per se, but a particular manner in which certain objects are construed and are evocative of certain thoughts and reactions. There is no one common property of sublime objects, no one single emotional state in sublime experiences, which is an essential feature of the sublime. For the sublime is but a notion in the mind and heart of the person in relation to the object, any object, which is confronted as sublime. However, from the standpoint of an external observer, one is able to distinguish in the experience of the sublime that which presupposes the universality of certain concepts and human characteristics and that which belongs to particular cultural and social forms and varies from culture to culture.

== Reference to St Anselm ==
The Sublime: Groundwork towards a Theory is concerned with language, thought and ultimate reality; as such, the book is a sequel to Tsang's master's thesis on logic, language and religion, which concludes with the possibility of God's existence and the relevance of St Anselm's "faith seeking understanding" to the question of God's existence. "Faith seeking understanding" is the original title of Anselm's Proslogion. The Epilogue of The Sublime alludes to, without affirming, two central ideas in the Proslogion: that God is Existence (“I am that I am.” Exodus 3:14), as explained in Anselm's ontological argument; and that man is created in the image of God (Genesis 1:27). Before engaging in the sublime, Tsang had been interested in existential wonder, which is wonder at the world of our existence and our existence in the world. An experience of the sublime, which is an intensified awareness of our self-realization at a life-limit, is existential wonder occasioned by an object construed as connected with going to the limit of some human possibility, and here the person may further respond in faith, seeking to understand what lies at the limit.

The Epilogue of The Sublime concludes with the self-fulfilling conception of the devout Christian in imitation of Christ the Son of God (John 14:6) under totally adverse conditions, attaining the sense of eternity in the active reflective order. Here is an example of the person of faith seeking to understand what lies at the limit of some human possibility, despite its inevitable subjectivity, even if unreachable, albeit ultimately desirable.

== Recognition ==
The Sublime is recognised in some quarters as ‘an important work offering a viable theory for the concept of "sublime" in philosophy’. Among those who consider the theory to be acceptable are Alasdair MacIntyre, an influential moral philosopher, and Cyril Barrett, a renowned aesthetician and art critic. However, as has been pointed out, the theory as proposed, even if it is viable, needs to be spelled out further.

== Bibliography ==
- Tsang Lap Chuen (1998). The Sublime: Groundwork towards a Theory. University of Rochester Press. ISBN 978-1580460279.
- Tsang Lap Chuen (1989). "God, Morality and Prudence: A Reply to Bernard Williams," The Heythrop Journal, Vol. 30, No. 4, pp. 433–438.
- Tsang Lap Chuen (1968). Logic, Language and Religion (MA Thesis, University of Hong Kong).
