= Sublime (philosophy) =

Quality of greatness

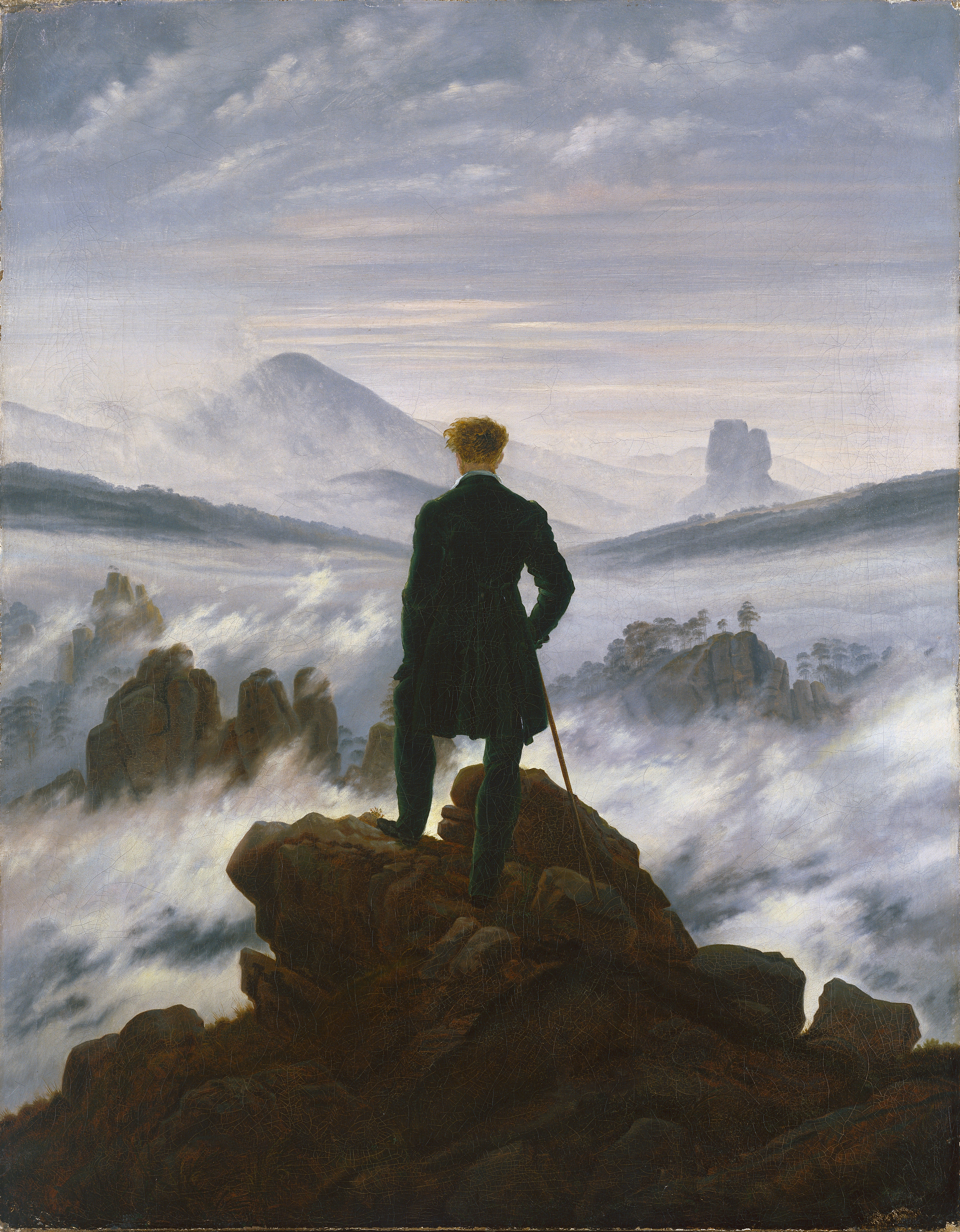
Caspar David Friedrich, Wanderer above the Sea of Fog, 1816, Kunsthalle Hamburg. Romantic artists during the 19th century used the epic of nature as an expression of the sublime.

The philosophical concept of the sublime (from Latin sublīmis 'uplifted, lofty, exalted, etc.; elevated, raised') is the quality of greatness beyond all possibility of calculation, measurement, or imitation. Since its first application in the field of rhetoric in ancient Greece, it became an important concept in literary theory, aesthetics, ethics, metaphysics, and spirituality, among others.

== Definition ==
According to Phillip Shaw:

Sublimity [...] refers to the moment when the ability to apprehend, to know, and to express a thought or sensation is defeated. Yet, through this very defeat, the mind gets a feeling for that which lies beyond thought and language.

== Ancient philosophy ==
The first known study of the sublime is by Longinus in Peri Hupsous/Hypsous or On the Sublime. This is thought to have been written in the 1st century AD though its origin and authorship are uncertain. For Longinus, the sublime is an adjective that describes great, elevated, or lofty thought or language, particularly in the context of rhetoric. As such, the sublime inspires awe and veneration, with greater persuasive powers. Longinus' treatise is also notable for referring not only to Greek authors such as Homer, but also to biblical sources such as Genesis.

This treatise was rediscovered in the 16th century, and its subsequent impact on aesthetics is usually attributed to its translation into French by linguist Nicolas Boileau-Despréaux in 1674. Later the treatise was translated into English by John Pultney in 1680, Leonard Welsted in 1712, and William Smith in 1739 whose translation had its fifth edition in 1800.

== Modern philosophy ==
The concept of the sublime emerged in Europe with the birth of literary criticism in the late 17th century. It was associated with the works of the French writers Pierre Corneille, Jean-Baptiste Racine, Jean-Baptiste l'Abbé Dubos, and Nicolas Boileau-Despréaux.

=== British philosophy ===
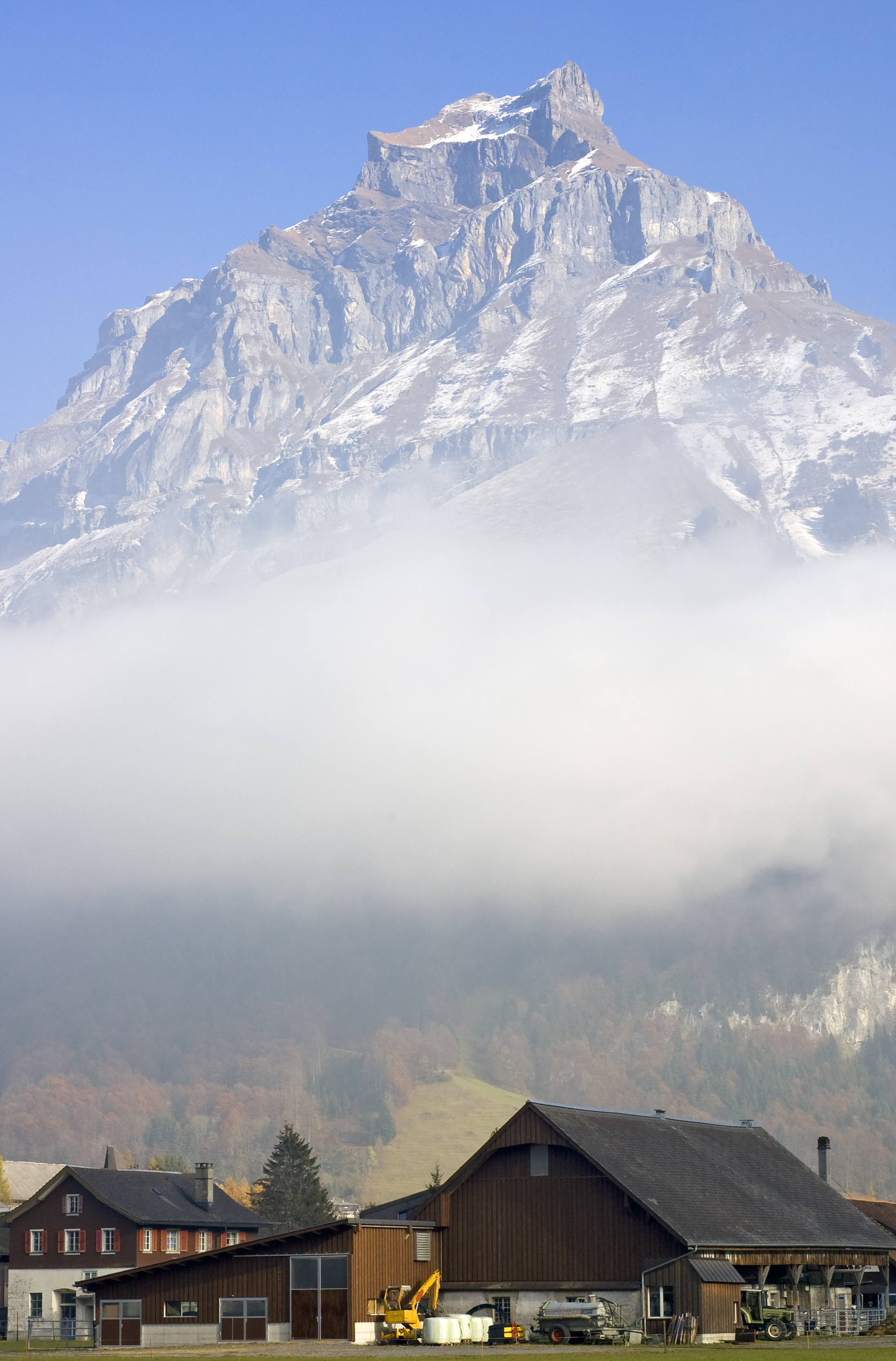
Hahnen, Swiss Alps. British writers, taking the Grand Tour in the 17th and 18th centuries, first used the sublime to describe objects of nature.

In Britain, the development of the concept of the sublime as an aesthetic quality in nature distinct from beauty was brought into prominence in the 18th century in the writings of Anthony Ashley-Cooper, 3rd Earl of Shaftesbury and John Dennis. These authors expressed an appreciation of the fearful and irregular forms of external nature, and Joseph Addison's synthesis of concepts of the sublime in his The Spectator, and later the Pleasures of the Imagination. All three Englishmen had, within the span of several years, made the journey across the Alps and commented in their writings of the horrors and harmony of the experience, expressing a contrast of aesthetic qualities.

Dennis was the first to publish his comments in a journal letter published as Miscellanies in 1693, giving an account of crossing the Alps where, contrary to his prior feelings for the beauty of nature as a "delight that is consistent with reason", the experience of the journey was at once a pleasure to the eye as music is to the ear, but "mingled with Horrours, and sometimes almost with despair". Shaftesbury had made the journey two years prior to Dennis but did not publish his comments until 1709 in the Moralists. His comments on the experience also reflected pleasure and repulsion, citing a "wasted mountain" that showed itself to the world as a "noble ruin" (Part III, Sec. 1, 390–91), but his concept of the sublime in relation to beauty was one of degree rather than the sharp contradistinction that Dennis developed into a new form of literary criticism. Shaftesbury's writings reflect more of a regard for the awe of the infinity of space ("Space astonishes" referring to the Alps), where the sublime was not an aesthetic quality in opposition to beauty, but a quality of a grander and higher importance than beauty. In referring to the Earth as a "Mansion-Globe" and "Man-Container," Shaftesbury writes, "How narrow then must it appear compar'd with the capacious System of its own Sun...tho animated with a sublime Celestial Spirit...." (Part III, sec. 1, 373).

Joseph Addison embarked on the Grand Tour in 1699 and commented in Remarks on Several Parts of Italy etc. that "The Alps fill the mind with an agreeable kind of horror". The significance of Addison's concept of the sublime is that the three pleasures of the imagination that he identified—greatness, uncommonness, and beauty—"arise from visible objects"; that is, from sight rather than from rhetoric. It is also notable that in writing on the "Sublime in external Nature", he does not use the term "sublime" but uses semi-synonymous terms such as "unbounded", "unlimited", "spacious", "greatness", and on occasion terms denoting excess.

The British description of the sublime is distinct from the Kantian conceptualization, which emphasized a detachment of aesthetic judgment. The British tradition is noted for its rejection of the idea that aesthetic judgment and ethical conduct are not connected. One of its positions holds that the affective register of the sublime is not divorced from the standards that govern human conduct and that it does not transcend ethical conduct.

Addison's notion of greatness was integral to the concept of sublimity. An object of art could be beautiful yet it could not possess greatness. His Pleasures of the Imagination, as well as Mark Akenside's Pleasures of the Imagination of 1744 and Edward Young's poem Night Thoughts of 1745 are generally considered the starting points for Edmund Burke's analysis of sublimity.

==== Edmund Burke ====
Edmund Burke developed his conception of sublimity in A Philosophical Enquiry into the Origin of Our Ideas of the Sublime and Beautiful of 1756. Burke was the first philosopher to argue that sublimity and beauty are mutually exclusive, although either can provide pleasure. Sublimity may evoke horror, but knowledge that the perception is a fiction is pleasureful. The dichotomy that Burke articulated is not as simple as Dennis' opposition, as Burke postulated that sublime and beautiful are antithetical, in the same degree as light and darkness. Light may accentuate beauty, but either great light or darkness can be sublime to the extent that they can annihilate vision of the object in question. What is "uncertain, and confused" moves the imagination to awe and a degree of horror.

Burke's concept of sublimity was an antithetical contrast to the classical conception of the aesthetic quality of beauty being the pleasurable experience that Plato described in several of his dialogues, e. g. Philebus, Ion, Hippias Major, and Symposium, and suggested that ugliness is an aesthetic quality in its capacity to instill intense emotions, ultimately providing pleasure. For Aristotle, the function of artistic forms was to instill pleasure, and he first pondered the problem that an object of art representing ugliness produces "pain." Aristotle's detailed analysis of this problem involved his study of tragic literature and its paradoxical nature as both shocking and having poetic value. The classical notion of ugliness prior to Edmund Burke, most notably described in the works of Saint Augustine of Hippo, denoted it as the absence of form and therefore as a degree of non-existence. For St. Augustine, beauty is the result of the benevolence and goodness of God in His creation, and as a category it had no opposite. Because ugliness lacks any attributive value, it is formless due to the absence of beauty.

Burke's treatise is also notable for focusing on the physiological effects of sublimity, in particular the dual emotional quality of fear and attraction that other authors noted. Burke described the sensation attributed to sublimity as a negative pain, which he denominated "delight" and which is distinct from positive pleasure. "Delight" is thought to result from the removal of pain, caused by confronting a sublime object, and supposedly is more intense than positive pleasure. Though Burke's explanations for the physiological effects of sublimity, e. g. tension resulting from eye strain, were not seriously considered by later authors, his empirical method of reporting his own psychological experience was more influential, especially in contrast to the analysis of Immanuel Kant. Burke is also distinguished from Kant in his emphasis on the subject's realization of his physical limitations rather than any supposed sense of moral or spiritual transcendence.

==== John Ruskin ====
The art critic and researcher John Ruskin responded to Edmund Burke's philosophical ideas on the sublime in his multi-volume work Modern Painters, published between 1843 and 1860. While Burke defined the sublime as an emotional reaction of awe – particularly when one experienced nature's grandeur – Ruskin turned Burke's argument around, postulating that true objectivity required a spiritual perception capable of discerning the moral order and the divine laws underlying the natural world. In doing so, he elevated the concept of the sublime into a moral and spiritual category. In painting, he stated, capturing objective truth in nature went far beyond a literal or mimetic effort.

He used the landscape painter J. M. W. Turner as the ideal example. To critics who considered Turner's paintings artless due to being poorly defined or using color in an exaggerated manner, Ruskin responded that Turner's work was a "noble" effort that sought to capture the deeper, spiritual laws of nature. He contrasted Turner's art to the popular picturesque style, which he considered "of a lesser nobility."

Ultimately, he generated an epistemological shift in the idea of the sublime by presenting the experience of nature as an encounter with "truth", by which he meant not a scientific perception of nature, but a perception of the divine order which animated the universe. Ruskin famously summarized this by writing: "The greatest thing a human soul ever does in this world is to see something, and tell what it saw in a plain way. To see clearly is poetry, prophecy, and religion, all in one." The act of seeing is thus elevated from a mere physiological process, as Burke presented it, transforming it into a deeper metaphysical encounter.

Aside from the discussion of what the sublime really meant, it was an established view since ancient times – one which Burke took for granted – that poetry was the primary medium through which the sublime could, or even should, be captured and conveyed. Ruskin argued that the paintings of Turner demonstrated that Burke was wrong in asserting that painting could not match the sublimity of poetry.

As Wilson explains,

[Turner's] quest for a visual vocabulary of the sublime [can be understood] as an emulation of the poetic medium, and as an attempt to demonstrate that the pictorial medium could be sublime in itself. [...] This ambition pervades much of Turner’s production, leading him to provide one of the most adequate pictorial responses to the challenge initiated by Burke’s Enquiry. [...] [Turner's] pictorial processes [were] an attempt to overcome the mimetic limitations of visual representation and articulate the presentation of the unpresentable.

This emphasis on capturing empirical sensations in painting provided the theoretical foundations for the French Impressionist painters, who cited Turner's techniques as a primary influence.

=== German philosophy ===
==== Immanuel Kant ====
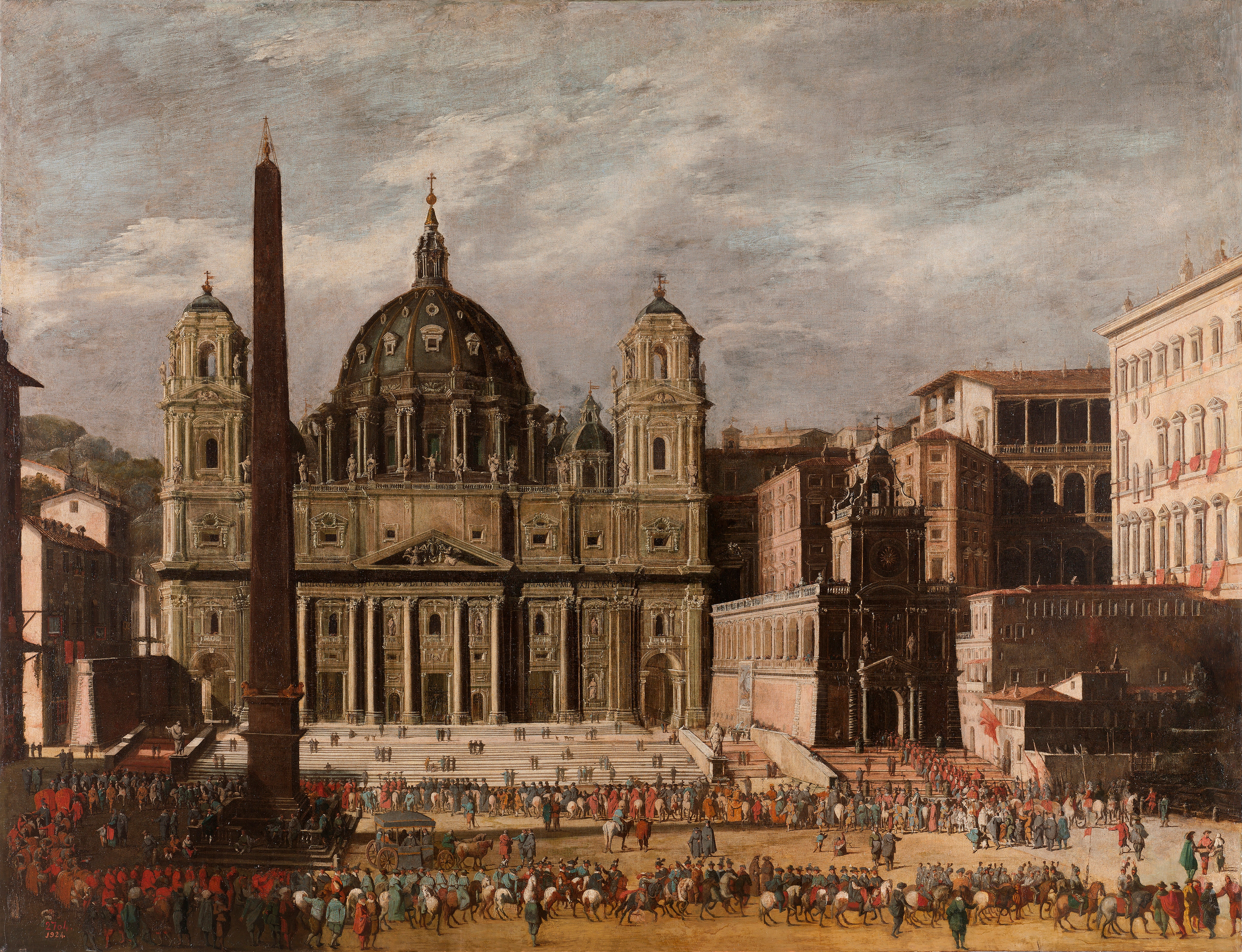
Viviano Codazzi: Rendition of St. Peter's Square, Rome, dated 1630. Kant referred to St. Peter's as "splendid", a term he used for objects producing feeling for both the beautiful and the sublime.

In an early work (of 1764), Immanuel Kant made an attempt to record his thoughts on the observing subject's mental state in Observations on the Feeling of the Beautiful and Sublime. He held that the sublime was of three kinds: the noble, the splendid, and the terrifying.

In his later Critique of Judgment (1790), Kant says that there are two forms of the sublime, the mathematical and the dynamical, although some commentators hold that there is a third form, the moral sublime, a hold-over from the earlier "noble" sublime. Kant claims, "We call that sublime which is absolutely great"(§ 25). He distinguishes between the "remarkable differences" of the Beautiful and the Sublime, noting that beauty "is connected with the form of the object", having "boundaries", while the sublime "is to be found in a formless object", represented by a "boundlessness" (§ 23).

Kant divides the sublime into the mathematical and the dynamical, where in the mathematical "aesthetical comprehension" is not a consciousness of a merely greater unit, but the notion of absolute greatness not constrained by any idea of limitation (§ 27). The dynamically sublime is "nature considered in an aesthetic judgment as might that has no dominion over us", and an object can create a fearfulness "without [us] being afraid of it" (§ 28).

He considers both the beautiful and the sublime as "indefinite" concepts, but where beauty relates to the "Understanding", sublime is a concept belonging to "Reason", and "shows a faculty of the mind surpassing every standard of Sense" (§ 25). For Kant, one's inability to grasp the magnitude of a sublime event (such as an earthquake) demonstrates the inadequacy of one's sensibility and imagination. Simultaneously, one's ability subsequently to identify such an event as singular and whole indicates the superiority of one's cognitive, supersensible powers. Ultimately, it is this "supersensible substrate," underlying both nature and thought, on which true sublimity is located.

==== Arthur Schopenhauer ====
To clarify the concept of the feeling of the sublime, Arthur Schopenhauer listed examples of its transition from the beautiful to the most sublime. This can be found in the first volume of his The World as Will and Representation, § 39.

For him, the feeling of the beautiful is in seeing an object that invites the observer to transcend individuality, and simply observe the idea underlying the object. The feeling of the sublime, however, is when the object does not invite such contemplation but instead is an overpowering or vast malignant object of great magnitude, one that could destroy the observer.

- Feeling of Beauty – Light is reflected off a flower. (Pleasure from a mere perception of an object that cannot hurt observer).
- Weakest Feeling of Sublime – Light reflected off stones. (Pleasure from beholding objects that pose no threat, objects devoid of life).
- Weaker Feeling of Sublime – Endless desert with no movement. (Pleasure from seeing objects that could not sustain the life of the observer).
- Sublime – Turbulent Nature. (Pleasure from perceiving objects that threaten to hurt or destroy observer).
- Full Feeling of Sublime – Overpowering turbulent Nature. (Pleasure from beholding very violent, destructive objects).
- Fullest Feeling of Sublime – Immensity of Universe's extent or duration. (Pleasure from knowledge of observer's nothingness and oneness with Nature).

==== Georg Wilhelm Friedrich Hegel ====
Georg Wilhelm Friedrich Hegel considered the sublime a marker of cultural difference and a characteristic feature of oriental art. His teleological view of history meant that he considered "oriental" cultures as less developed, more autocratic in terms of their political structures and more fearful of divine law. According to his reasoning, this meant that oriental artists were more inclined towards the aesthetic and the sublime: they could engage God only through "sublated" means. He believed that the excess of intricate detail that is characteristic of Chinese art, or the dazzling metrical patterns characteristic of Islamic art, were typical examples of the sublime and argued that the disembodiment and formlessness of these art forms inspired the viewer with an overwhelming aesthetic sense of awe.

==== Rudolf Otto ====
Rudolf Otto compared the sublime with his newly coined concept of the numinous. The numinous comprises terror, Tremendum, but also a strange fascination, Fascinans.

== Contemporary philosophy ==
=== 20th century ===
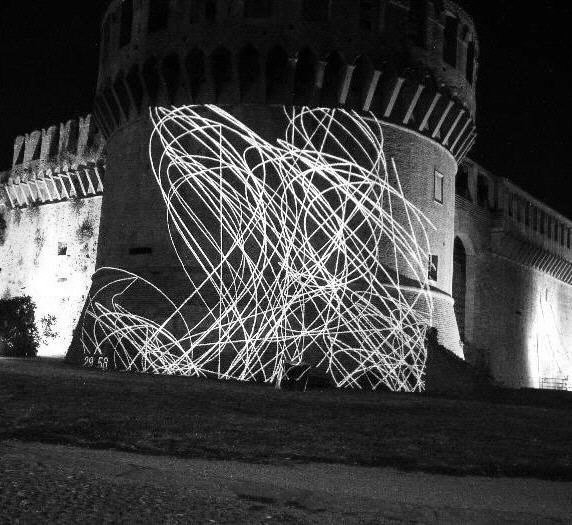
Maurizio Bolognini, SMSMS (SMS Mediated Sublime), 2000–2006, an interactive installation that aims to involve the audience in the experience of the manipulation and consumption of the technological sublime

At the beginning of the 20th century Neo-Kantian German philosopher and theorist of aesthetics Max Dessoir founded the Zeitschrift für Ästhetik und allgemeine Kunstwissenschaft, which he edited for many years, and published the work Ästhetik und allgemeine Kunstwissenschaft in which he formulated five primary aesthetic forms: the beautiful, the sublime, the tragic, the ugly, and the comic.

The experience of the sublime involves a self-forgetfulness where personal fear is replaced by a sense of well-being and security when confronted with an object exhibiting superior might, and is similar to the experience of the tragic. The "tragic consciousness" is the capacity to gain an exalted state of consciousness from the realization of the unavoidable suffering destined for all men and that there are oppositions in life that can never be resolved, most notably that of the "forgiving generosity of deity" subsumed to "inexorable fate".

Thomas Weiskel re-examined Kant's aesthetics and the Romantic conception of the sublime through the prism of semiotic theory and psychoanalysis. He argued that Kant's "mathematical sublime" could be seen in semiotic terms as the presence of an excess of signifiers, a monotonous infinity threatens to dissolve all oppositions and distinctions. The "dynamic sublime", on the other hand, was an excess of signifieds: meaning was always overdetermined.

According to Jean-François Lyotard, the sublime, as a theme in aesthetics, was the founding move of the Modernist period. Lyotard argued that the modernists attempted to replace the beautiful with the release of the perceiver from the constraints of the human condition. For him, the sublime's significance is in the way it points to an aporia (impassable doubt) in human reason; it expresses the edge of our conceptual powers and reveals the multiplicity and instability of the postmodern world.

=== 21st century ===
According to Mario Costa, the concept of the sublime should be examined first of all in relation to the epochal novelty of digital technologies, and technological artistic production: new media art, computer-based generative art, networking, telecommunication art. For him, the new technologies are creating conditions for a new kind of sublime: the "technological sublime". The traditional categories of aesthetics (beauty, meaning, expression, feeling) are being replaced by the notion of the sublime, which after being "natural" in the 18th century, and "metropolitan-industrial" in the modern era, has now become technological.

There has also been some resurgence of interest in the sublime in analytic philosophy since the early 1990s, with occasional articles in The Journal of Aesthetics and Art Criticism and The British Journal of Aesthetics, as well as monographs by writers such as Malcolm Budd, James Kirwan and Kirk Pillow. As in the postmodern or critical theory tradition, analytic philosophical studies often begin with accounts of Kant or other philosophers of the 18th or early 19th centuries. Noteworthy is a general theory of the sublime, in the tradition of Longinus, Burke and Kant, in which Tsang Lap Chuen presents the notion of limit-situations in life as being central to the human experience.

Jadranka Skorin-Kapov in The Intertwining of Aesthetics and Ethics: Exceeding of Expectations, Ecstasy, Sublimity argues for sublimity as the common root to aesthetics and ethics:

The origin of surprise is the break (the pause, the rupture) between one's sensibility and one's powers of representation... The recuperation that follows the break between one's sensibility and one's representational capability leads to sublimity and the subsequent feelings of admiration and/or responsibility, allowing for the intertwining of aesthetics and ethics... The roles of aesthetics and ethics—that is, the roles of artistic and moral judgments, are very relevant to contemporary society and business practices, especially in light of the technological advances that have resulted in the explosion of visual culture and in the mixture of awe and apprehension as we consider the future of humanity.

== See also ==
- Digital sublime
- Numinous
- Overview effect
- Sense of wonder
- Sublime (literary)
