= Digital dystopia =

Dystopian society arising due to technology

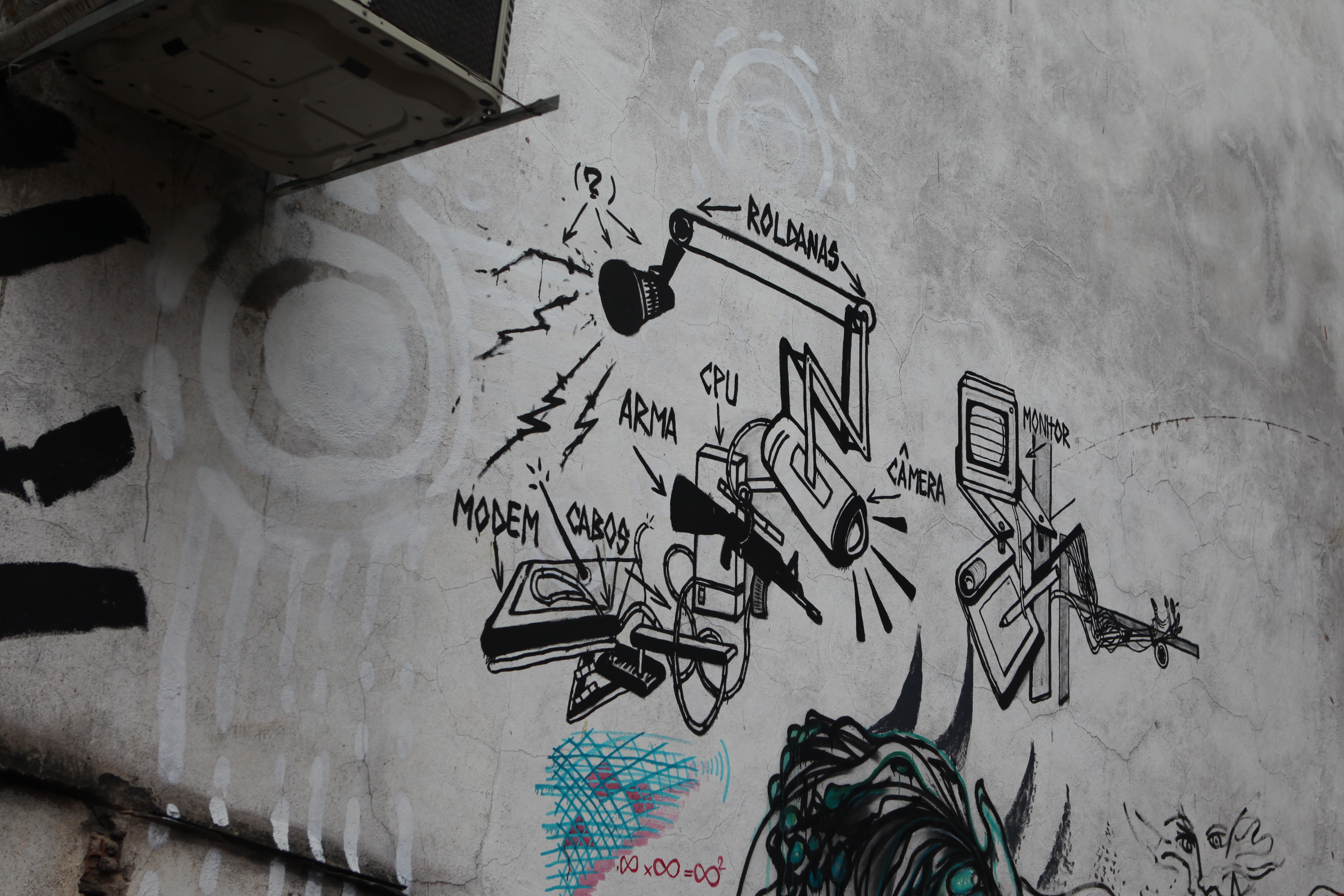
Smart city dystopia, a graffiti on a wall in Lapa, Rio de Janeiro

Digital dystopia, cyber dystopia or algorithmic dystopia refers to an alternate future or present in which digitized technologies or algorithms have caused major societal disruption. It refers to dystopian narratives of technologies influencing social, economic, and political structures, and its diverse set of components includes virtual reality, artificial intelligence, ubiquitous connectivity, ubiquitous surveillance, and social networks. In popular culture, technological dystopias often are about or depict mass loss of privacy due to technological innovation and social control. They feature heightened socio-political issues like social fragmentation, intensified consumerism, dehumanization, and mass human migrations.

== Origins ==
In 1998, "digital dystopia" was used to describe negative effects of multichannel television on society. "Cyber-dystopia" was coined in 1998 in connection with cyber-punk literature.

One of the earliest mentions is on 2004 when an academic and blogger was expelled for commenting on how the Sims Online Computer game based in the city of Alphaville had become a digital dystopia controlled by "president" Donald Meacham and corrupt faction of robot nobles had become a digital dystopia with crime, cyber-sex prostitution and general civic chaos. Digital experimentation of the elements of cyberspace became extremely invasive and took on the appearance of anarchy in Alphaville.

In August 2007, David Nye presented the idea of cyber-dystopia, which envisions a world made worse by technological advancements. Cyber-dystopian principles focus on the individual losing control, becoming dependent and being unable to stop change.

Nancy Baym shows a cyber-dystopia negatively effect of a cyber-dystopia in social interactions as it says new media will take people away from their intimate relationships, as they substitute mediated relationships or even media use itself for face to face engagement".

The dystopian voices of Andrew Keen, Jaron Lanier, and Nicholas Carr tell society as a whole could sacrifice our humanity to the cult of cyber-utopianism. In particular, Lanier describes it as "an apocalypse of self-abdication" and that "consciousness is attempting to will itself out of existence"; warning that by emphasising the majority or crowd, we are de-emphasising individuality. Similarly, Keen and Carr write that there is a dangerous mob mentality that dominates the internet; since, rather than creating more democracy, the internet is empowering the rule of the mob. Instead of achieving social equality or utopianism, the internet has created a "selfie-centered" culture of voyeurism and narcissism.

John Naughton, writing for The Guardian, described Aldous Huxley, the author of Brave New World, as the prophet of digital dystopia.

== See also ==
- Cyberpunk
- Digital sublime
