= Digital empathy =

Empathy applied to technology design

Digital empathy is the application of the core principles of empathy – compassion, cognition, and emotion – into technical designs to enhance user experience. It involves both cognitive and affective components of empathy. This includes the ability to understand another person's perspective and share or respond to their emotions and experiences in a digital environment. Scholars have explained that it requires people to interpret emotion based on limited social cues, like emojis. According to Friesem (2016), digital empathy is the cognitive and emotional ability to be reflective and socially responsible while strategically using digital media.

== Background ==
Digital empathy finds its roots in empathy, a human behaviour explained by cognitive and behavioral neuroscientists as, “a multifaceted construct used to account for the capacity to share and understand the thoughts and feelings of others." The neurological basis for empathy lies in mirror neurons, where perception and imitation facilitate empathy.

At the centre of empathy creation is communication. As communication became increasingly online due to the rapid adoption of digital communications technology in the 1990s through the 2000s, society’s communication patterns altered rapidly, both positively and negatively. Technology usage has transformed human interactions into digital conversations where people now have the ability to instantly share thoughts, feelings, and behaviors via digital channels in a few seconds. Digital empathy often lacks nonverbal cues that people use to determine context like tone, body language, and facial expression which makes the reader have a difficult time interpreting the message. It has been observed and researched that digital conversations threaten the appropriate expression of empathy, largely as a result of the “online disinhibition effect”. Psychologist Dr. John Suler defines the online disinhibition effect as the tendency for “ people say and do things in cyberspace that they wouldn’t ordinarily say and do in the face-to-face world”. Research has shown that the shift away from face-to-face communication has caused a decline in the social-emotional skills of youth and suggest that "generations raised on technology" are becoming less empathic.

== Digital Empathy ==
Increasingly online communication patterns, and the associated phenomenon of online disinhibition, have led to research on "digital empathy". Christopher Terry and Cain (2015) in their research paper “The Emerging Issue of Digital Empathy” define digital empathy as the “traditional empathic characteristics such as concern and caring for others expressed through computer-mediated communications.” Yonty Friesem (2016) wrote that “digital empathy seeks to expand our thinking about traditional empathy phenomena into the digital arena."

In the handbook of research on media literacy in the digital age, Friesem (2015) further elaborates on this concept by stating that, “digital empathy explores the ability to analyze and evaluate another’s internal state (empathy accuracy), have a sense of identity and agency (self-empathy), recognize, understand and predict other’s thoughts and emotions (cognitive empathy), feel what others feel (affective empathy), role play (imaginative empathy), and be compassionate to others (empathic concern) via digital media."

The importance of digital empathy is the role it plays in maintaining our relationships in world of increasing communication through technology. As our communication becomes more digital, people may have less opportunities than before to interpret social cues which impacts understanding levels.

== Applications ==
Digital empathy is used in DEX (Digital employee experience), healthcare and education. In healthcare, traditional empathetic characteristics can be understood as a physician’s ability to understand the patient's experience and feelings, communicate and check their understanding of the situation, and act helpfully. According to Nina Margarita Gonzalez, digitally empathetic tools in healthcare should meet these conditions of physician empathy by designing empathetic tools through 3 key steps: understand, check, and act. By ensuring that the digital tool understands the patient experience, the tool can act through “automated empathy” to provide validating statements or tips. For example, The National Cancer Institute created texting programs that collected information on user’s smoking cessation efforts and provided validation or tips to support them, such as, “We know how you are feeling. Think about what you are gaining and why you want to quit smoking.”

New health communications technology and telehealth makes clear the need for medical practitioners to recognize and adapt to online disinhibition and the lack of nonverbal cues. The University of the Highlands and Islands Experience Lab completed a study on empathy in video conferencing consultations with diabetes patients. It found that many factors impact the level of perceived empathy in a video conferencing consultation, including clarity of verbal communication, choice in pathways of care, and preparation and access to information before the consultation. Given the particular challenge that the online disinhibition effect poses to telehealth or other digital health communications, Terry and Cain suggest that, for physicians to effectively communicate empathy through digitally-mediated interactions, they must be taught traditional empathy more broadly, as the foundational principles are the same.

In education, researchers are often concerned with how to use digital technologies to teach empathy and how to teach students to be empathetic when using digital platforms. In “Empathy for the Digital Age”, Yonty Friesem (2016) found that empathy can be taught to youth through video production, where the majority of students experienced higher levels of empathy after writing, producing, creating, and screening their videos in a project designed to foster empathy. Cheryl Wei-yu Chen similarly found that video projects can help youth develop awareness of empathy in digitally-mediated interactions. In their research, Friesem and Greene (2020) used digital empathy to promote digital and media literacy skills of foster youth. Practicing cognitive, emotional and social empathy through digital media have been effective to support not only the academic skills of the foster youth, but also their well being, sense of belonging and media literacy skills. As an important practice of digital literacy and media education, digital empathy is an inclusive and collaborative experience as students learn to produce their own media.

Digital Employee Experience is a relatively new (circa 2019) field of IT. It focuses on ensuring employees have the best possible "Digital" experience when using technology in work. DEX market leaders 1E use concepts of Digital Empathy in the implementation of their DEX platform. They describe Digital Empathy as the solution to "IT Friction" which occurs when devices, applications and systems do not work or react as users expect them to, causing user frustration, increasing IT costs and loss of productivity.

It is increasingly relevant in social media where users must navigate communication without traditional nonverbal cues. An example of this would be using tone indicators like emojis to express empathy. In workplace settings, we see digital empathy supporting collaboration by allowing people to communicate from the office or at home in a professional manner.

Challenges that arise when practicing digital empathy can be difficult because of the absence of nonverbal cues like tone, body language, and facial expressions. This can lead to misinterpretations or misunderstandings of intent. People make communicate more harshly online than they would in person because they are not connecting their emotions to the person on the screen. Heavy reliance on technology has become prevalent in younger generations which also raises concern on lack of social and emotional skills.

== See also ==
- Accessibility
- Artificial empathy
- Artificial intelligence in healthcare
- Chatbot
- Computer-mediated communication
- Data quality
- Digital sublime
- Emotions in virtual communication
- Empathic concern
- Empathic design
- Information and communications technology
- Online disinhibition effect
- Usability
- User-centered design
