= Observations on the Feeling of the Beautiful and Sublime =

1764 book by Immanuel Kant

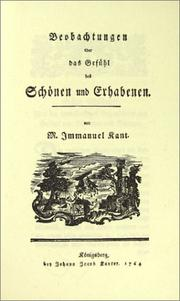
- Author: Immanuel Kant
- Original title: Beobachtungen über das Gefühl des Schönen und Erhabenen
- Language: German
- Subject: Aesthetics
- Published: 1764
- Media type: Print

Observations on the Feeling of the Beautiful and Sublime (German: Beobachtungen über das Gefühl des Schönen und Erhabenen) is a 1764 book by Immanuel Kant.

The first complete translation into English was published in 1799. The second, by John T. Goldthwait, was published in 1960 by the University of California Press.

== Section One ==
Of the Distinct Objects of the Feeling of the Beautiful and Sublime

Kant states that feelings of enjoyment are subjective. In this book, he describes his observations. His interest is not in coarse, thoughtless feelings or in the other extreme, the finest feelings of intellectual discovery. Instead, he writes about the finer feelings, which are intermediate. These require some sensitivity, intellectual excellence, talent, or virtue.

There are two kinds of finer feeling: the feeling of the sublime and the feeling of the beautiful. Kant gives examples of these pleasant feelings. Some of his examples of feelings of the beautiful are the sight of flower beds, grazing flocks, and daylight. Feelings of the sublime are the result of seeing mountain peaks, raging storms, and night.

In this section, Kant gives many particular examples of feelings of the beautiful and the sublime. Feelings of the beautiful "occasion a pleasant sensation but one that is joyous and smiling." On the other hand, feelings of the sublime "arouse enjoyment but with horror."

Kant subdivided the sublime into three kinds. The feeling of the terrifying sublime is sometimes accompanied with a certain dread or melancholy. The feeling of the noble sublime is quiet wonder. Feelings of the splendid sublime are pervaded with beauty.

== Section Two ==
Of the Attributes of the Beautiful and Sublime in Man in General

Kant described the relationship between these finer feelings and humanity. The feelings are not totally separate from each other. Beauty and the sublime can be joined or alternated. Kant claimed that tragedy, for the most part, stirs the feeling of the sublime. Comedy arouses feelings for beauty. The personal appearance of humans prompts these feelings in various cases. A person's social position also affects these feelings.

Human nature has many variations of the feelings of the beautiful and the sublime. Some variations of the terrifying sublime are the adventurous and grotesque. Visionaries and cranks are persons who have fantasies and whims. The beautiful, when it degenerates, produces triflers, fops, dandies, chatterers, silliness, bores, and fools.

True virtue is different from what commonly is known about these moral traits: goodheartedness, benevolence and sympathy or compassion and also good-natured agreeableness are not true virtues, in accordance to Kant's view. The only aspect that makes a human truly virtuous is to behave in accordance with moral principles. Kant presents an example for more clarification; suppose that you come across a needy person in the street; if your sympathy leads you to help that person, your response does not illustrate your virtue. In this example, since you do not afford helping all needy ones, you have behaved unjustly, and it is out of the domain of principles and true virtue. True virtue is the quality of raising the feeling of humanity's beauty and dignity to a principle. When a person acts in accordance with this principle, regardless of inclination, that person is truly and sublimely virtuous. Kant applies the approach of four temperaments to distinguish truly virtuous people. According to Kant, among all people with diverse temperaments, a person with melancholy frame of mind is the most virtuous whose thoughts, words and deeds are one of principles.

"A profound feeling for the beauty and dignity of human nature and a firmness and determination of the mind to refer all one's actions to this as to a universal ground is earnest, and does not at all join with a changeable gaiety nor with the inconstancy of a frivolous person." With this observation, Kant will attempt to fit the various feelings of the beautiful and sublime, and the resulting moral characters, into Galen's rigid arrangement of the four humours or human temperaments: melancholic, sanguine, choleric, and phlegmatic.

Kant asserted that the human temperaments or dispositions are fixed and separate characters. An individual who has one frame of mind has no feeling or sense for the finer feelings that occur in a person of another temperament.

- A person who has a constitution that is melancholic will have a predominating feeling for the sublime. That person may possess genuine virtue based on the principle that humanity has beauty and worth.
- One who has a sanguine nature will mostly have a feeling for the beautiful. This results in an "adoptive" virtue that rests on goodheartedness. This person's compassion and sympathy depend on the impression of the moment.
- A choleric human will have a feeling for the splendid or showy sublime. As a result, this person will possess an apparent virtue. Kant calls it "a gloss of virtue." This includes a sense of honor and concern for outward appearance.
- Phlegmatic people have apathy or lack of any finer feeling. They therefore may have an absence of virtue.

Kant viewed human nature in general as a combination of these virtues. As such, human nature is a splendid expression of beauty and dignity.

== Section Three ==
Of the Distinction of the Beautiful and Sublime in the Interrelations of the Two Sexes

In Section Three, Kant asserts that women predominantly have feelings for all that is beautiful. Men, on the contrary, have mostly feelings for the sublime. Any other feelings that are only for the enhancement of the main feeling. Kant admits, though, that the distinction is not absolute. Since "we are dealing with human beings; we must also remember that they are not all alike."

Kant helps to root notions of inequality in the Western social structure. For example, Kant argues that "a woman is little embarrassed that she does not possess high insights; she is beautiful and captivates, and that is enough ... Laborious learning or painful pondering, even if a woman should greatly succeed in it, destroys the merits that are proper to her sex."

Women's mental ability and understanding, then, refer to the beautiful. Men's deep, noble understanding is not suitable for women. Women have beautiful virtues such as kindness and benevolence. Men's virtue is noble and has to do with principles and duty. Because a woman is concerned with the beautiful, the worst that can be said against her is that she is disgusting. A man's greatest defect, however, would be that he is ridiculous, as this is the opposite of the sublime.

In sexual selection, a woman demands that the man have noble and sublime characteristics. A man wants a woman to possess beautiful qualities. In a marriage, the husband and wife unite their disparate attributes to form, as it were, a single moral person. The man's understanding combines with the wife's taste to constitute a union.

== Section Four ==
Of National Characteristics, so far as They Depend upon the Distinct Feeling of the Beautiful and Sublime

Here Kant describes the different ways that various people have finer feelings. He qualifies his remarks by stating, "[W]hether these national differences are contingent and depend upon the times and the type of government, or are bound by a certain necessity to the climate, I do not here inquire."

The Italians have a strong feeling for the beautiful with some mixture of the thoughtful sublime. The French have mostly a feeling for the beautiful, but with the addition of the joyful sublime. The feeling of the Germans is an almost equal blend of both the beautiful and the splendid sublime in that they are much concerned with outward appearances. The feeling of the noble sublime predominates with the English, whose actions are guided by principles rather than impulses. With their cruel autos-da-fé and harsh conquests, the Spaniards have feeling for the terrifying sublime. Dutch people in Holland have no finer taste and are concerned only with what is useful. Arabs are like the Spaniards. Persians resemble the French. The Japanese are the Englishmen of the Orient. West India displays its love of the grotesque sublime, as also do the Chinese. African Negroes possess no finer feelings. North American Indians, however, have a feeling for the sublime in that they are adventurous, honorable, truthful, proud, brave, and valorous.

In antiquity, the ancient Greeks and Romans had remarkable feelings for both the beautiful and the sublime. However, with the Caesars, this decayed into a love of false glitter. The subsequent barbarian Gothic civilization had an overpowering feeling for the grotesque. Kant claimed that his time witnessed "the sound taste of the beautiful and noble blossoming forth both in the arts and sciences and in respect to morals." He declared that it is necessary to educate the younger generation so that they will have noble simplicity, high morals, and finer feelings.

== Editions ==
- Kant, Immanuel. Observations on the Feeling of the Beautiful and Sublime. Trans. John T. Goldthwait. University of California Press, 1961, 2003.
