= Portrait of a Black Man with a Sword =

17th-century painting

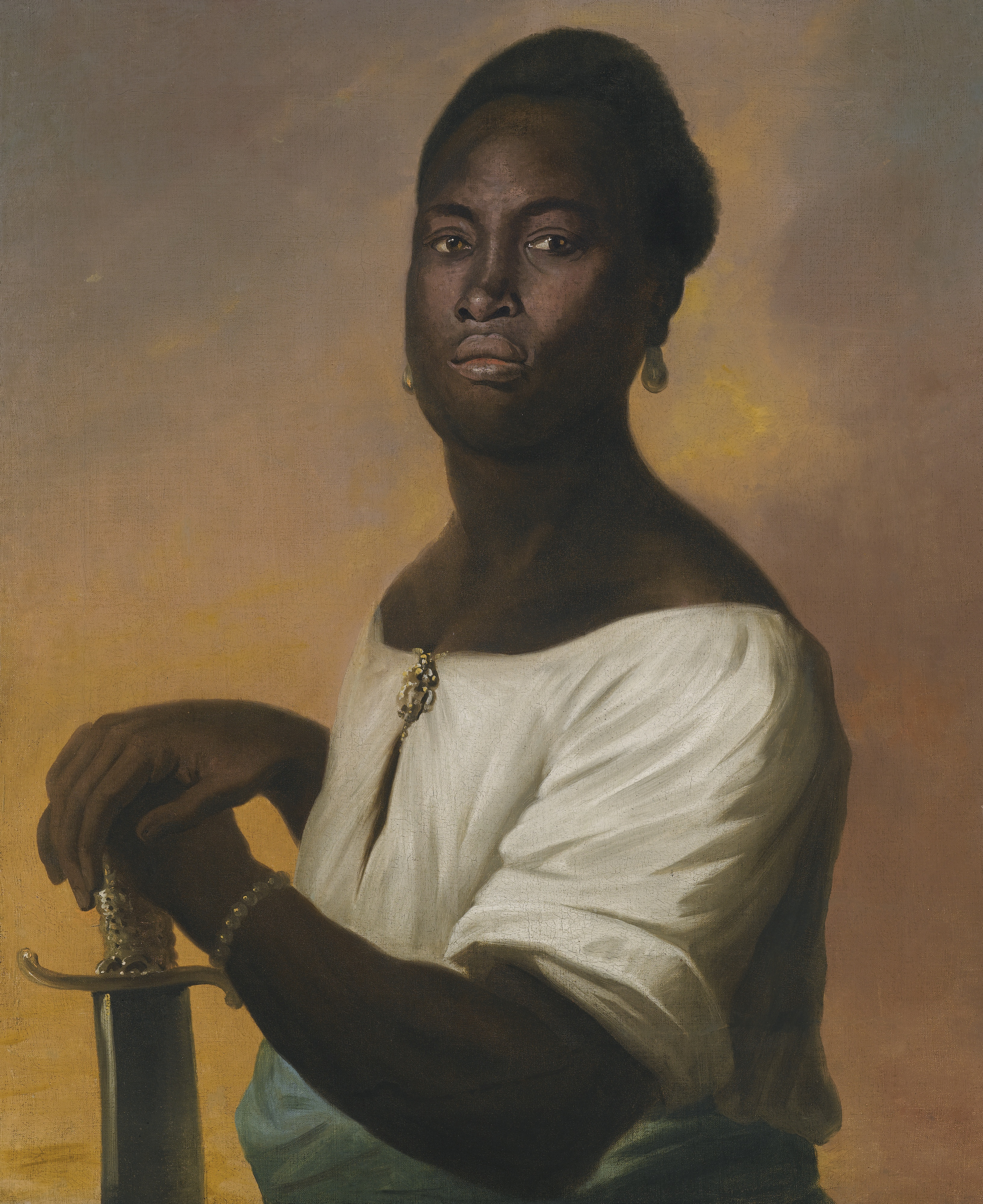
- Year: c. 1640s
- Medium: oil paint, canvas
- Dimensions: 75 cm (30 in) × 62 cm (24 in)
- Identifiers: RKDimages ID: 192183

Portrait of a Black Man with a Sword is a circa 1640s Flemish School painting which Sotheby's last sold in London for GDP 34,850 in 2011.

The motif of an imposing Black man presented in a landscape follows the style of the Portrait of Dom Miguel de Castro, Emissary of Congo in the National Gallery of Denmark, in Copenhagen. Previously attributed to Jaspar Beckx and Albert Eckhout, the experts are still undecided on the authorship of that 1643 and other 1640s paintings from the gift of 26 paintings from John Maurice, Prince of Nassau-Siegen to Frederick William, Elector of Brandenburg as souvenirs of his Brazil expedition. In any case they have concluded that this painting, though dated on stylistic grounds to the same period, was not by the same hand. It is possible that this painting was produced in Antwerp, which became the primary center to order an "Adoration of the Kings" and this could be one of many studies for the magi Balthazar. On this basis it has recently been attributed to Jacob Jordaens and Jan Boeckhorst. Because of the various disagreements in the scholarship, Sotheby's kept the "mid 17th-century Flemish School" attribution given in the 2008 exhibition Black is beautiful: Rubens tot Dumas.

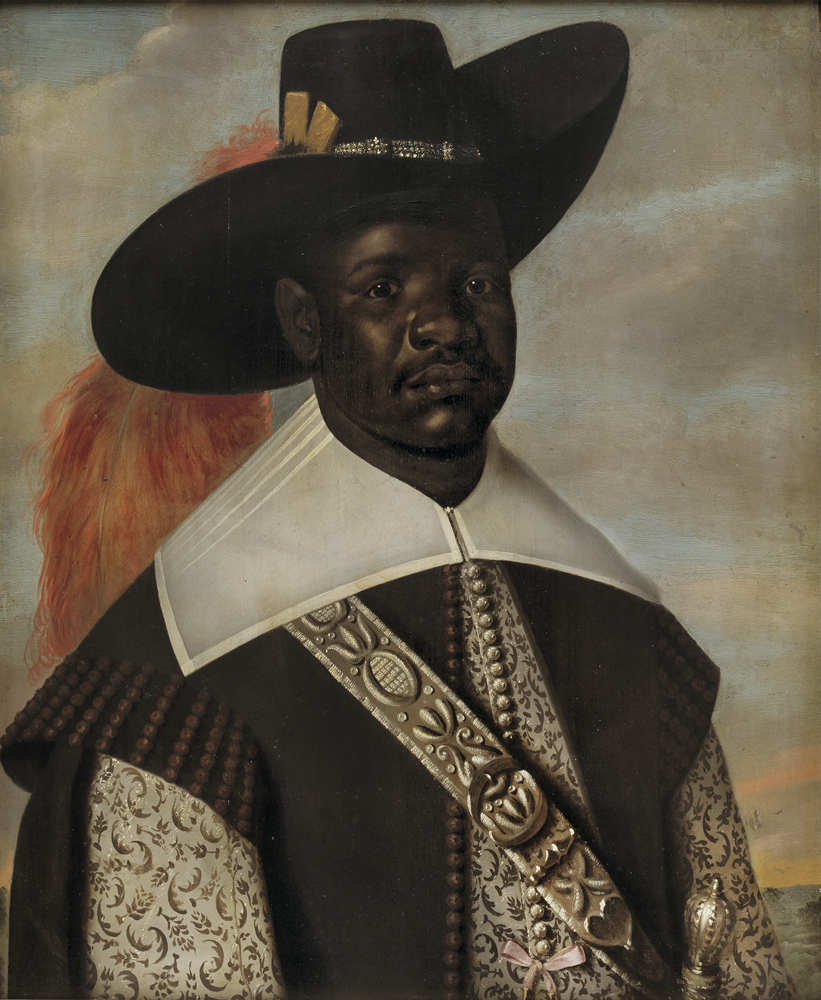
Portrait of Dom Miguel de Castro, Emissary of Congo

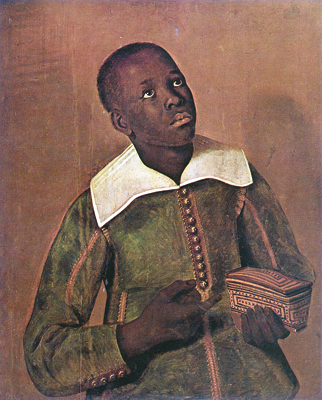
His servant holding a box of beads

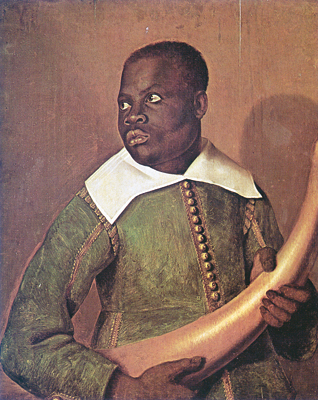
His servant holding an elephant tusk
