= Black Woman with Child =

Painting by Albert Eckhout

American woman
- Black Woman with Child
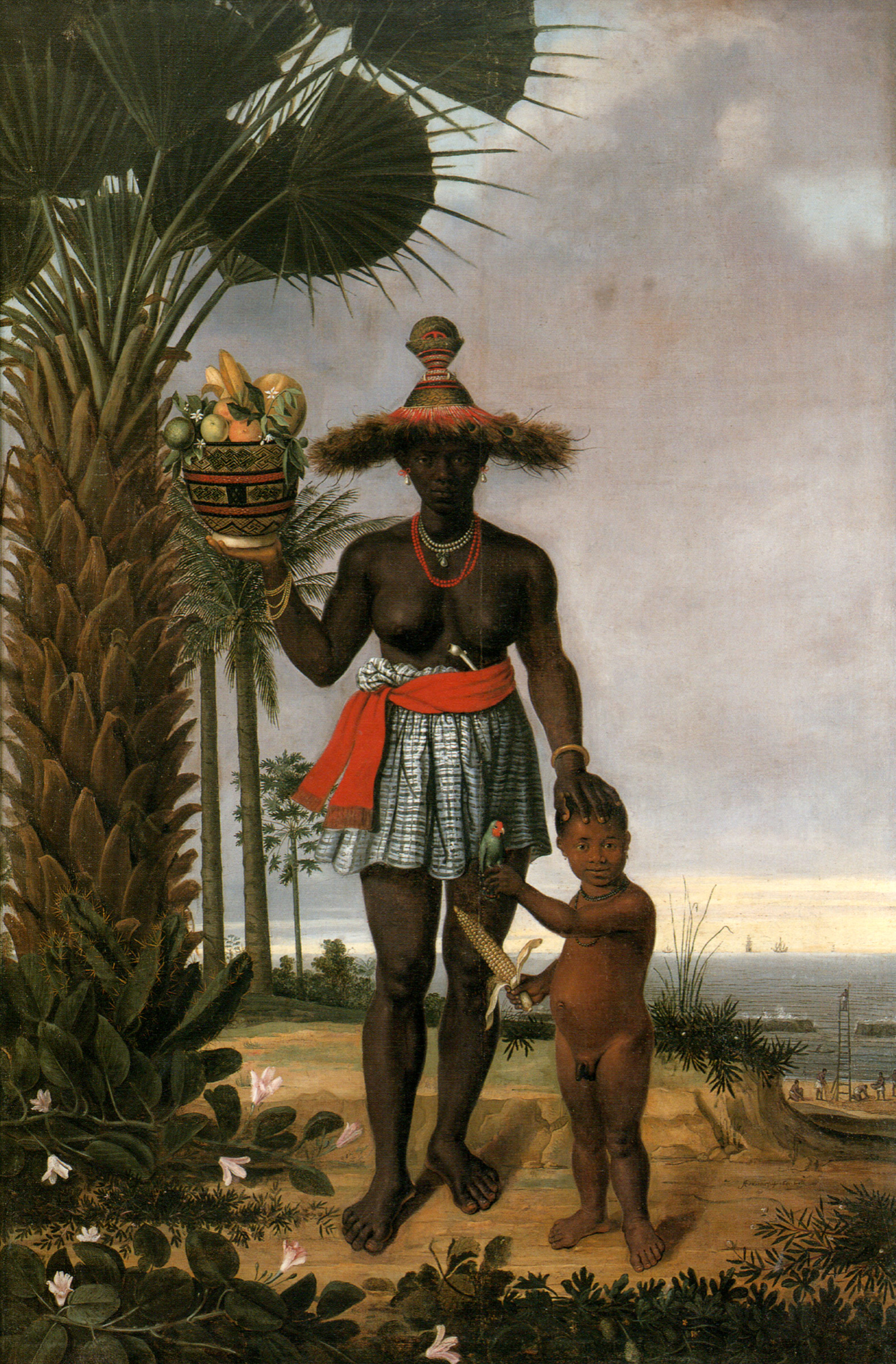
- Artist: Albert Eckhout
- Year: 1650
- Dimensions: 267 cm (105 in) × 178 cm (70 in)
- Accession no.: N.38.a8
- Identifiers: RKDimages ID: 113896

Black Woman with Child is a full-length portrait of a Black woman with a child painted in c. 1650 by the Dutch painter Albert Eckhout. It is in the collection of the National Museum of Denmark, in Copenhagen.

The sitters are unidentified, since the purpose of the painting was not to convey the character of a specific woman with her child, but rather to describe an ethnic New World type. The painting featured as the cover of the book Albert Eckhout, Court Painter in Colonial Dutch Brazil in 2006, and then it appeared in the 2008 exhibition in Amsterdam called Black is beautiful: Rubens tot Dumas. Eckhout was one of six scientific artists invited by John Maurice, Prince of Nassau-Siegen to go to Brazil to document life there. Of the others, only Frans Post and Georg Marcgraf are known today. The doctor Willem Piso, who was on the expedition team as a naturalist, later together with Marcgraf wrote and published the book Historia Naturalis Brasiliae in 1648.

The woman holds tropical Brazilian fruits, carrying them in a basket of African Bakongo weave. She wears an African Bakongo hat, but wears European jewelry and carries a European pipe in her sash. She rests her hand on the head of her son, who has a lighter skin color, which was to illustrate the fact that skin color can change and become darker with age. The landscape behind her is probably the port of Mauritstad (today's Recife). The pose with a tree is based on the ethnographical prints in the standard work on Guinea by Pieter de Marees.

The painting is one of 24 paintings given by Johan Maurits van Nassau Siegen to King Frederick III of Denmark in 1678. This painting, along with its pendant, were copied multiple times.

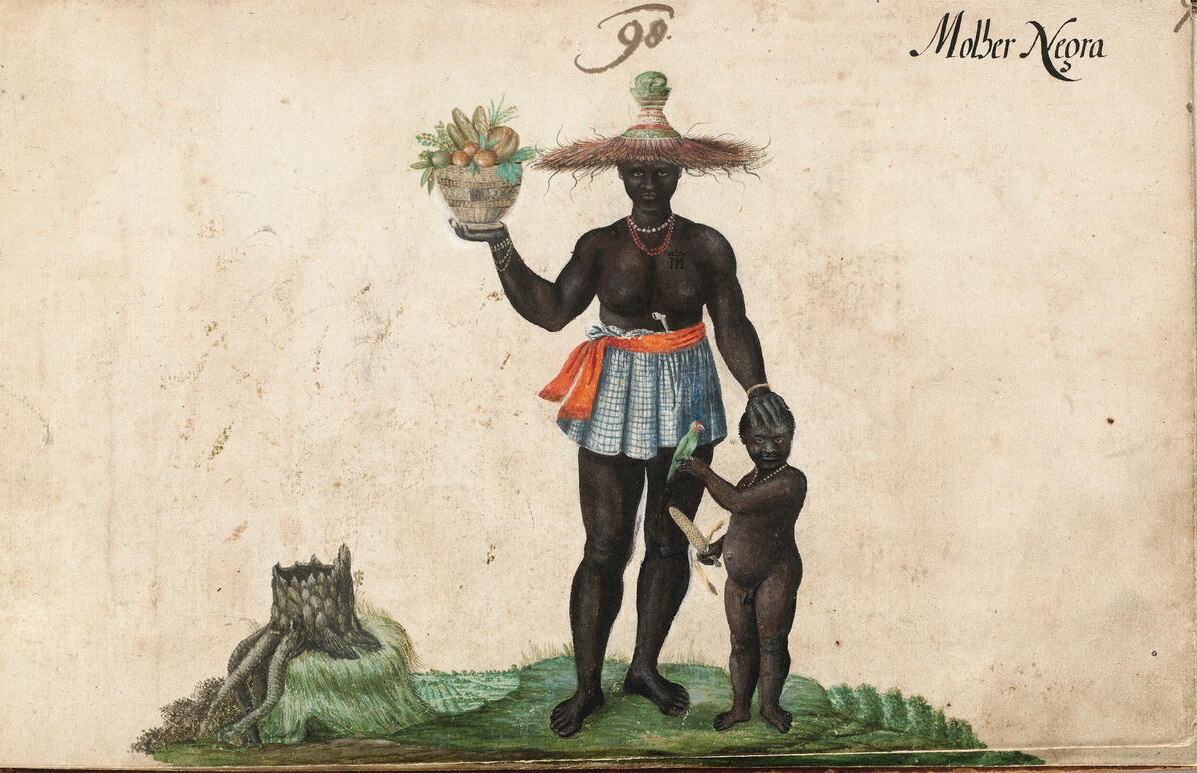
Page from Zacharias Wagenaer's Thier Buch, 1641

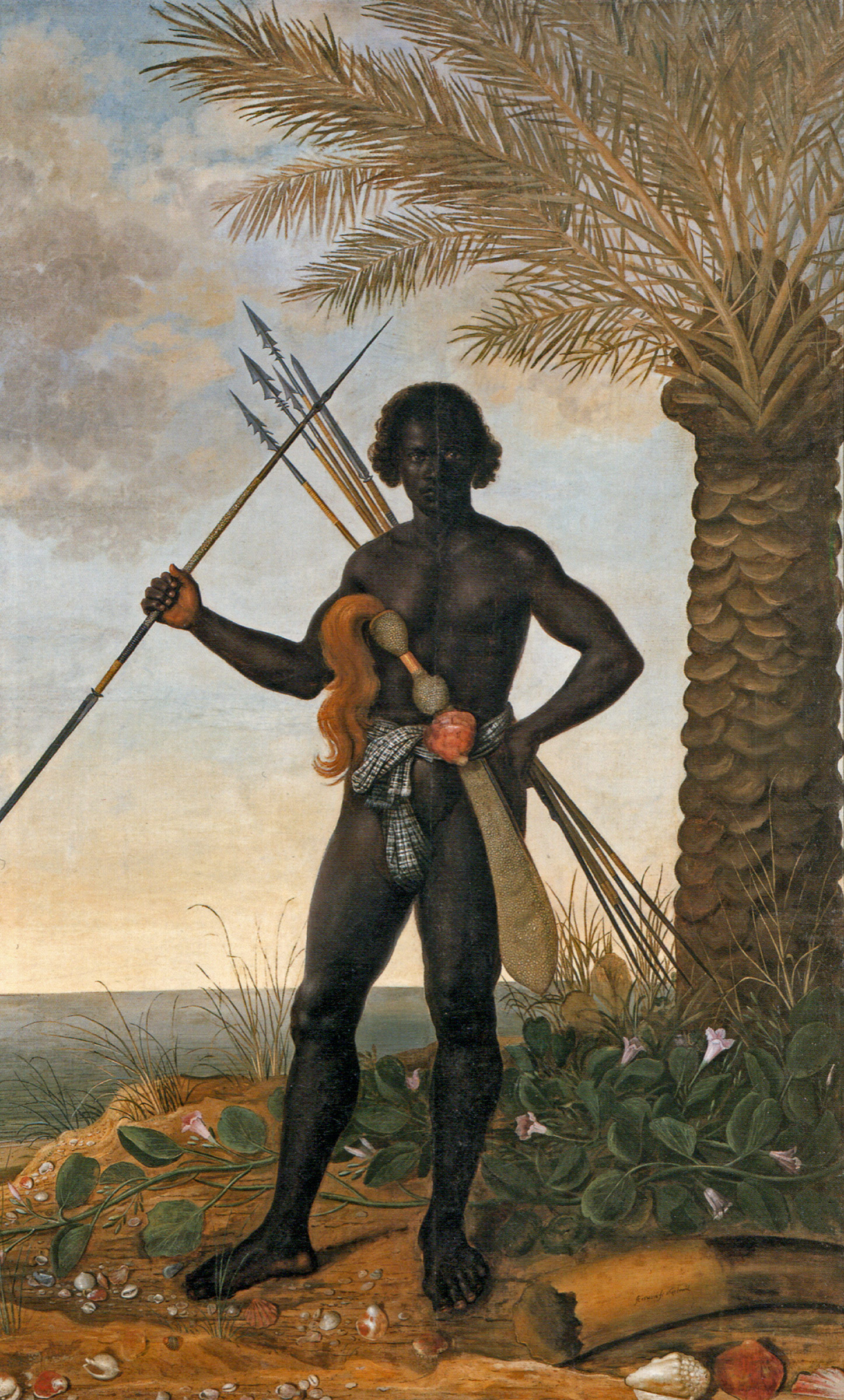
Pendant of an African man with tusk, sword, and assegai

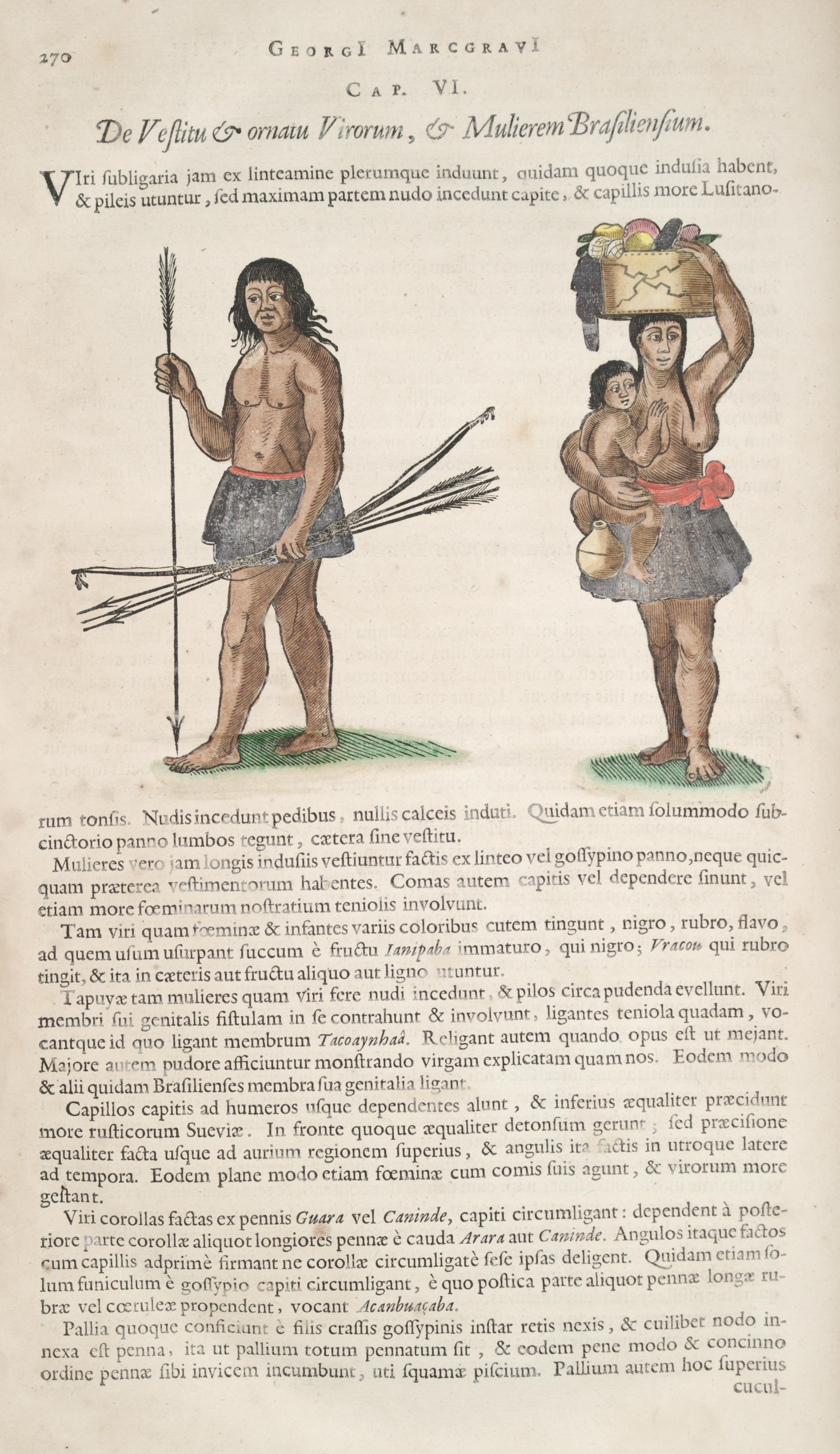
Page from Historia Naturalis Brasiliae, 1648

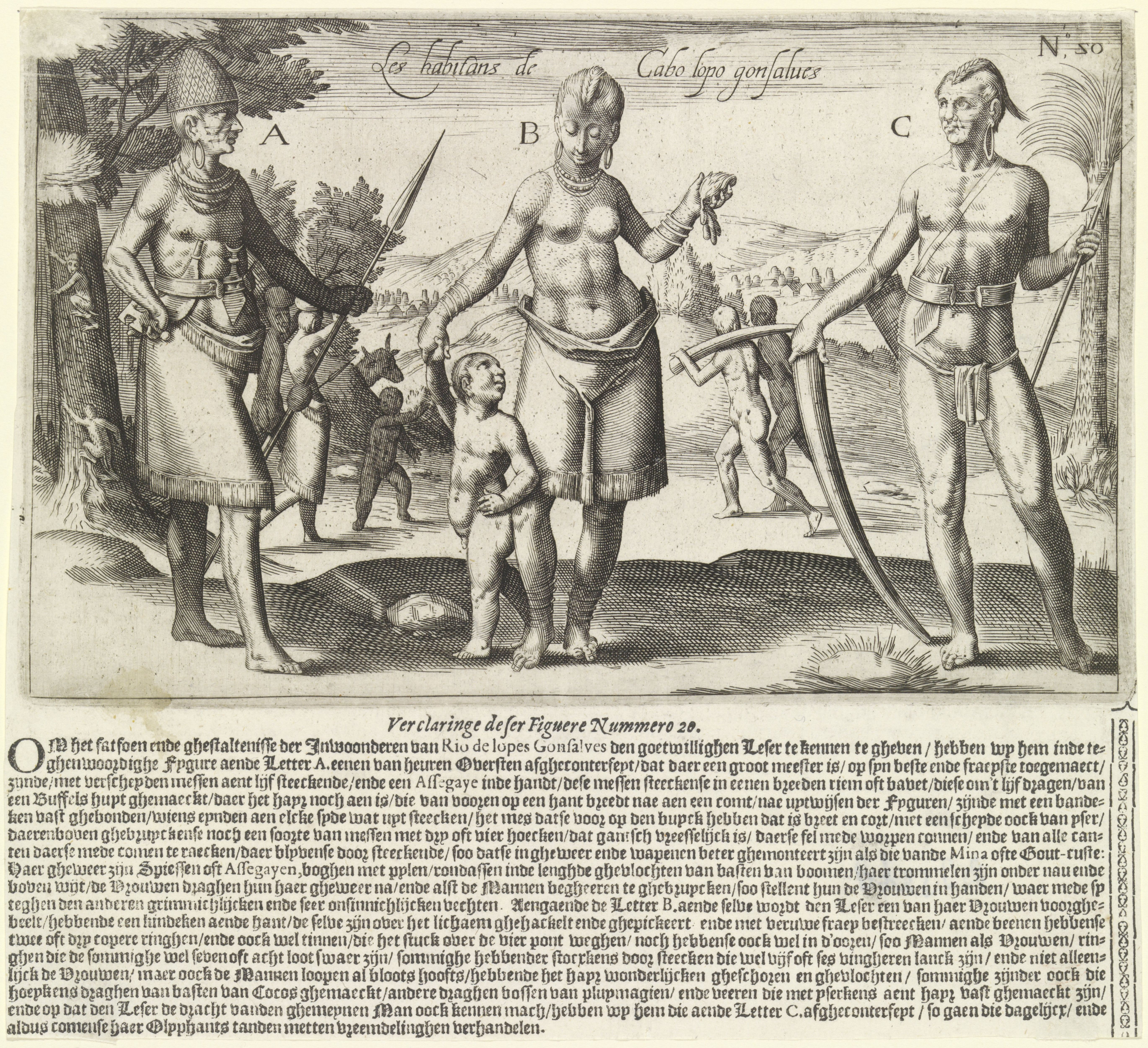
Inhabitants of Cape Lopez, illustration by Johann Theodor de Bry for Pieter de Marees, 1602
