= Portrait of Dom Miguel de Castro, Emissary of Congo =

1643 oil painting

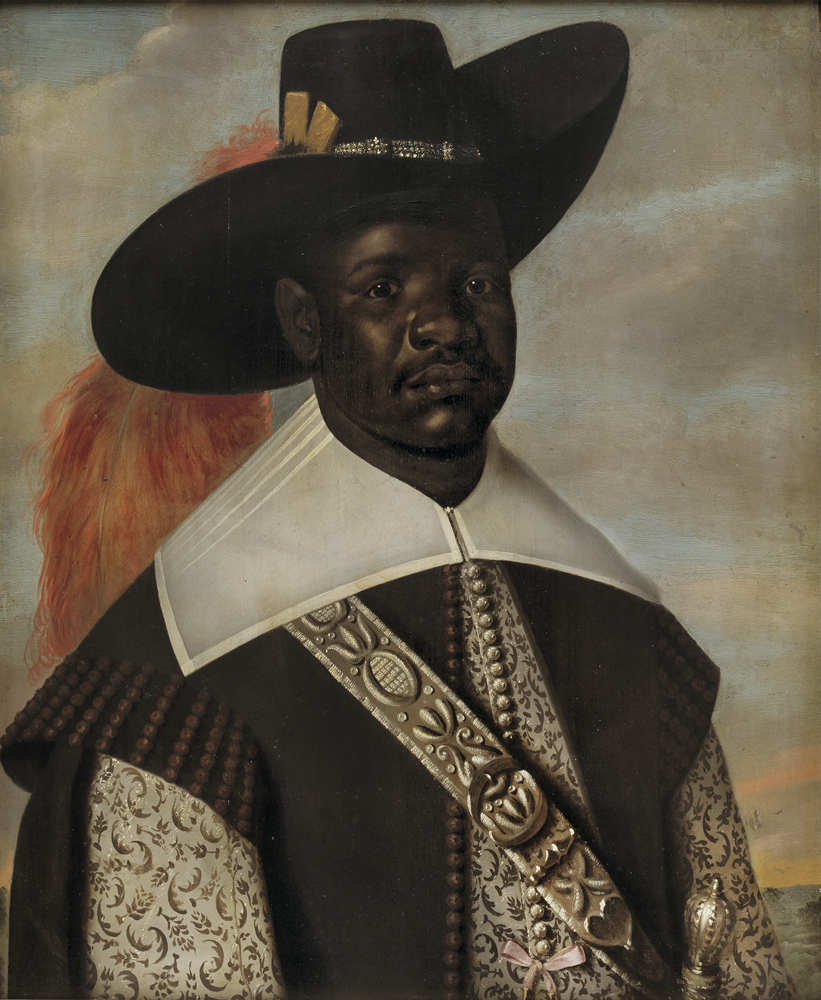
- Portrait of Dom Miguel de Castro, Emissary of Congo
- Artist: Jasper or Jeronimus Becx
- Year: 1643
- Medium: Oil on canvas
- Dimensions: 75 cm × 62 cm (30 in × 24 in)
- Location: National Gallery of Denmark; Copenhagen

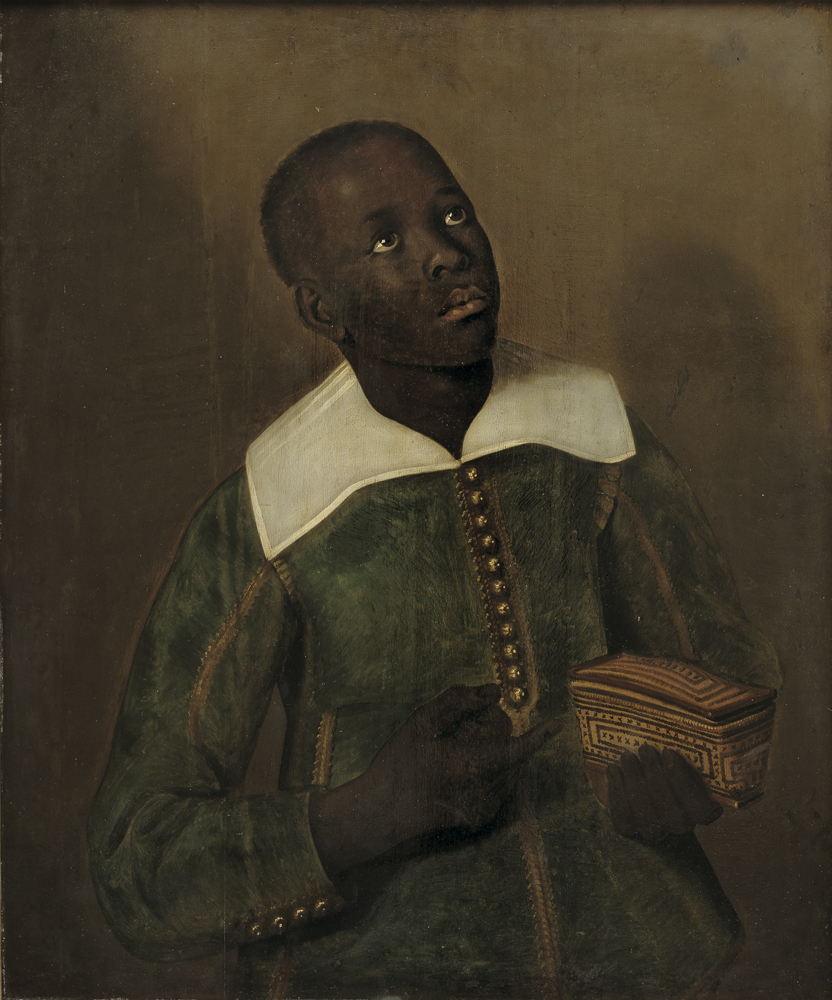
Diogo Bemba, a Servant of Dom Miguel de Castro.

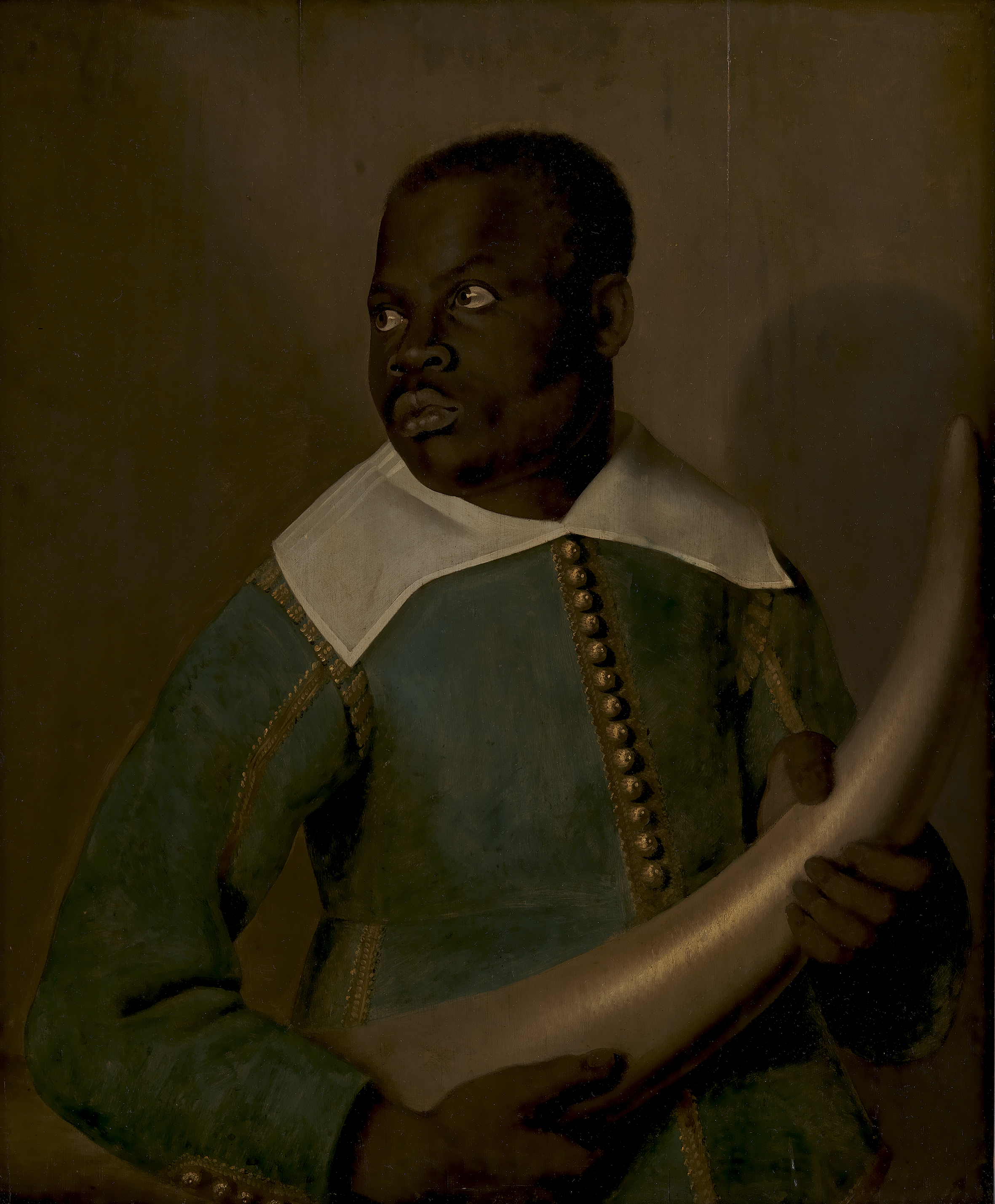
Pedro Sunda, a Servant of Dom Miguel de Castro.

Portrait of Dom Miguel de Castro, Emissary of Congo is a 1643 painting by the Dutch Golden Age painter Jasper or Jeronimus Becx. It was earlier attributed to Albert Eckhout.

== Description ==
The painting is a portrait of Dom Miguel de Castro, a cousin of the Count of Sonho, who was sent as an envoy to the Dutch Republic to ask the Dutch stadtholder for mediation in a conflict the count had with King Garcia II of Kongo. The Dutch West India Company had conquered Loango-Angola in 1641 from the Portuguese, and they had heavily relied on the assistance of the Count of Sonho.

Dom Miguel de Castro travelled with a few servants to the Dutch Republic via Dutch Brazil, where they had been received by Governor John Maurice, Prince of Nassau-Siegen. On 19 June 1643, Dom Miguel de Castro arrived in Flushing, where he was received by three directors of the Zealand chamber of the Dutch West India Company, and who provided him with accommodation in Middelburg. Eventually he was sailed by yacht to The Hague on 2 July 1643, where he had an audience with stadtholder Frederick Henry, Prince of Orange.

During his two-week stay in Middelburg, the directors ordered six paintings from Jasper or Jeronimus Becx, comprising two portraits of Dom Miguel de Castro, one portrait each of both his servants, a painting "in Portuguese clothes," and a full-length painting in "Congolese dress." Dom Miguel de Castro requested to take one of his portraits back to Africa. The paintings were paid for in May 1645.

After John Maurice resigned his governorship of Brazil in early 1644, he visited Middelburg in October 1644 to settle his affairs with the Zealand chamber of the Dutch West India Company. At this occasion, he was given the portrait of Dom Miguel de Castro and that of two of his servants.

== Attribution ==
John Maurice donated the three portraits, together with 20 Brazilian paintings by Albert Eckhout, to King Frederick III of Denmark, which is why the portraits eventually ended up in the collection of the National Gallery of Denmark. Because the portraits were donated together with the Brazilian paintings of Eckhout, the three portraits have been mistakenly attributed to him as well. Documentary evidence clearly suggests the paintings were painted during Dom Miguel de Castro's stay in Middelburg. Furthermore, the fact that the paintings were painted on oak wood, which at the time was not readily available in Brazil, clearly suggests that the portraits were painted in Europe.

It is still unclear whether Jasper or his brother Jeronimus Becx painted the portraits. Both worked and lived in Middelburg in 1643.

== Influence ==
The Senegalese photographer Omar Victor Diop made a self-portrait in reference to Dom Miguel de Castro' portrait for his 2015 exhibition Diaspora. In 2008, Portrait of a Black Man with a Sword was shown in Amsterdam that had previously been associated with this portrait. It has since been shown to be by a different hand but dated to the same period.
