= Albert Eckhout =

Dutch painter

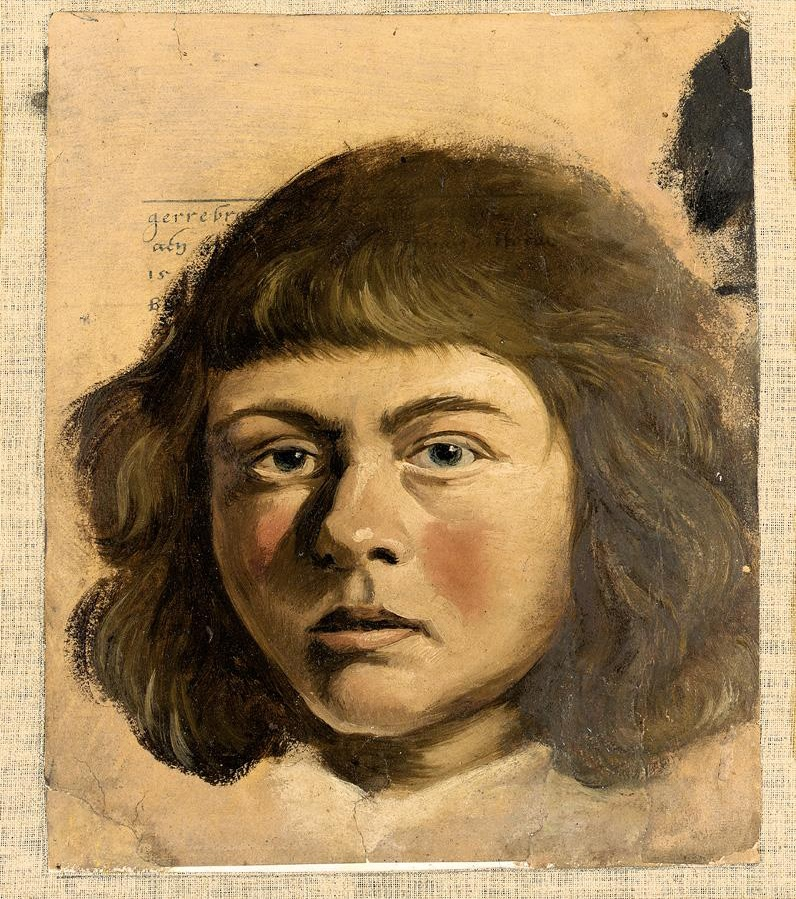
Albert Eckhout

Albert Eckhout (c.1610–1665) was a Dutch portrait and still life painter. Eckhout, the son of Albert Eckhourt and Marryen Roeleffs, was born in Groningen, but his training as an artist and early career are unknown. A majority of the works attributed to him are unsigned. He was among the first European artists to paint scenes from the New World. He was in the entourage of the Dutch governor-general of Brazil, Johan Maurits, Prince of Nassau-Siegen, who took him and fellow painter Frans Post to Dutch Brazil to have them record the country's landscape, inhabitants, flora and fauna. Eckhout is also famous for his still-life paintings of Brazilian fruits and vegetables. His paintings were intended for decoration in a domestic context.

== Work ==
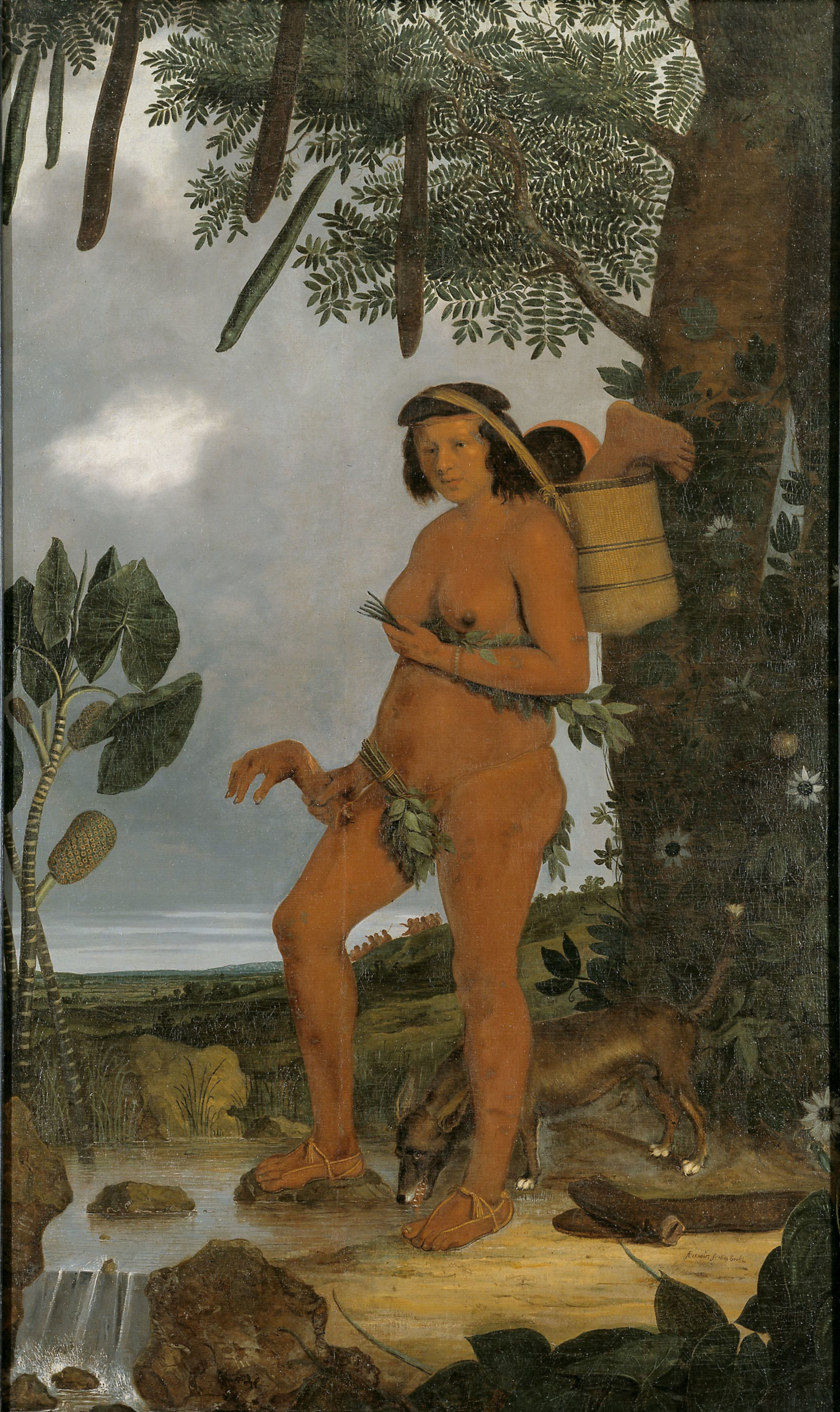
Tapuyan cannibal woman with a human hand in her hand and foot in her basket, standing under a tree that is likely Cassia grandis, 1641.

Eckhout focused on the people, plants and animals of the region when arriving in Dutch Brazil. He painted eight life-size ethnographic representations of Brazil's inhabitants, twelve still lifes, and a large piece of dancing indigenous people. These ethnographic works, done between 1641 and 1643 for Maurits, were subsequently gifted to Maurits's cousin, King Frederick III of Denmark, and they remain in Copenhagen to this day. His work is said to be the first realistic images of the Tupi and Tapuya tribes of the native population of Brazil. Alexander von Humboldt saw the paintings in 1827, as did Brazilian Emperor Dom Pedro II in 1876, both of whom praised the works enthusiastically.

=== Tapuyas ===
When painting the Tapuya, his goal was to be as accurate as possible by including various plants in the background, as well as indigenous animals and reptiles in the foreground. One of his ethnographic works is a calmly composed Tupuyan woman, who holds a human hand and has a human leg in her basket, which reflects the European stereotype that indigenous Americans practiced cannibalism. Eckhout's image of the Tapuya woman echoes another of his paintings, The Tapuya Dance, representing a dance performed by eight Tapuya Indians with their characteristic mushroom hair style, spear-throwers (atlatls) and war-clubs, depicting a spectacular war dance ceremony. These pictures were accordance with the stereotypical mental image Europeans had of indigenous Brazilians.

=== Africans ===
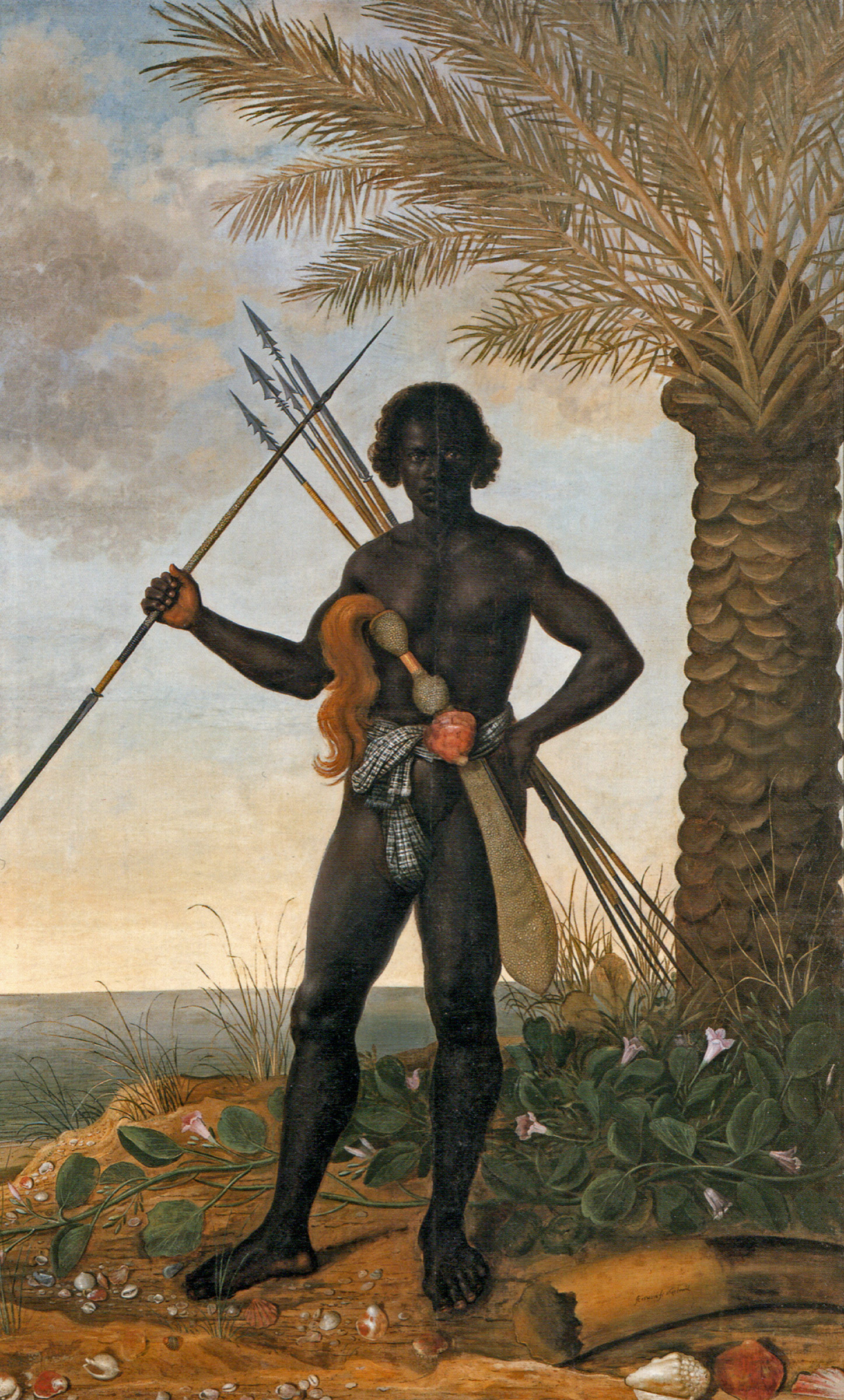
Albert Eckhout, African Man

Eckhout's paintings of the African man and women speak a multi-layered language of trade, gift giving, and political alliance to their contemporary audiences, Maurits and his court. These paintings are related to the area of Africa where the Dutch had conquered the greatest number of commercial contacts during the seventeenth century, Guinea and Angola. During this time, Dutch West India Company troops had established forts in these two areas of the West African Coast because the Dutch needed a reliable source of black Africans for enslaved labor on their Brazilian sugar plantations.

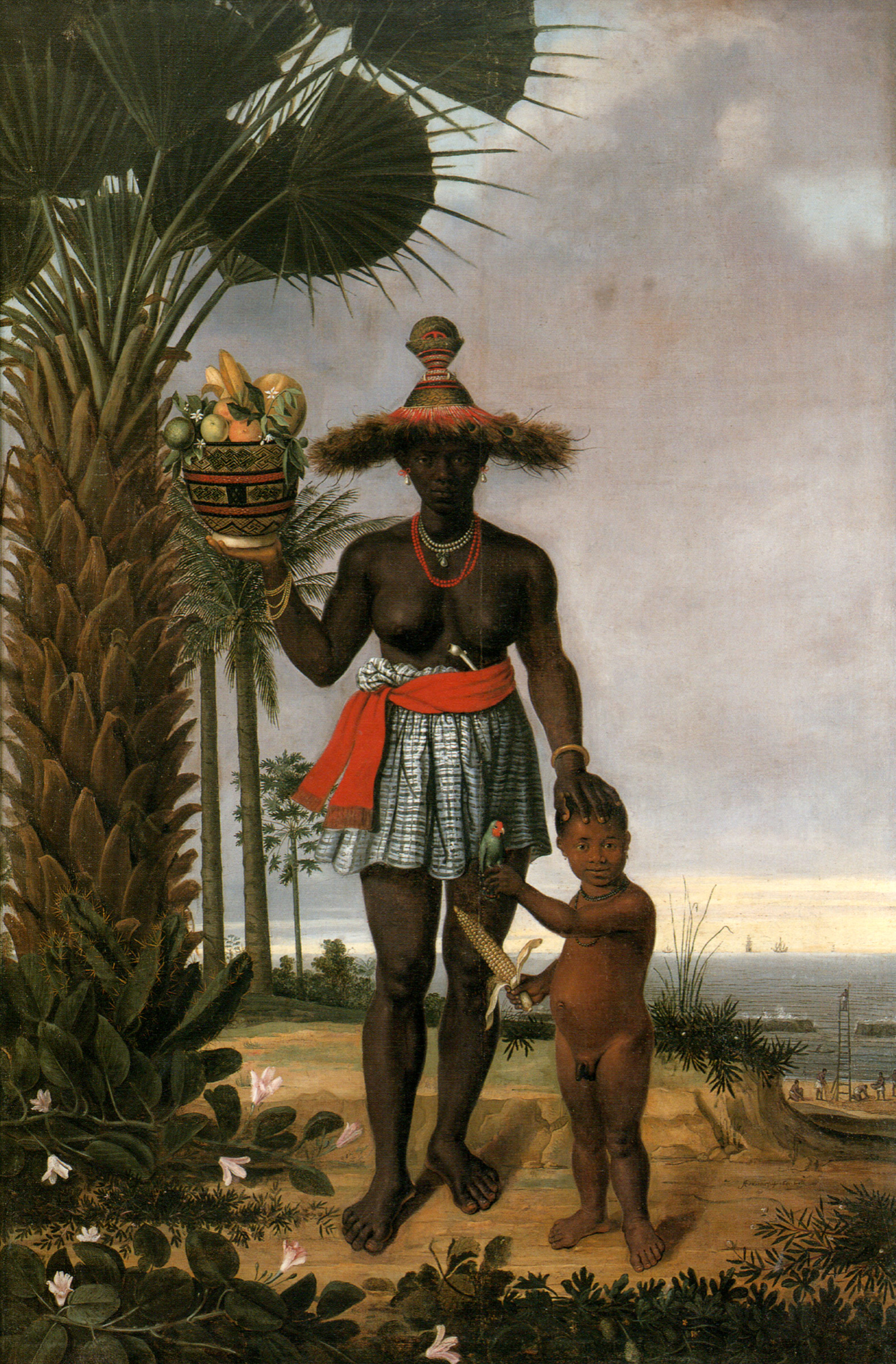
Black Woman with Child

His painting of the black woman has the figure standing against the coast with palms, and a papaya tree. Amerindians are depicted fishing along the shoreline, and ships are on the horizon. In the image, the woman wears a hat with peacock feathers and a small white clay pipe that is tucked into the sash at her waist. The nude boy on her side is most likely her son, though the child's skin tone is several shades lighter than the woman's skin color. The white pearl double ropes and red coral beads that curve around her neck expose her breasts. This image's emphasis on sexuality, fecundity, and prosperity is reinforced by her cornucopia-like basket, which overflows with tropical fruit. When looking at Eckhout's image of the black man, the man's strength and virility are highlighted by his muscular appearance and the phallic form of the palm tree at his left. The man holds a ceremonial sword that is decorated with a large pink shell. At the bottom of his feet are shells laid out with an elephant's tusk on the ground, curving out of the picture plane to the right. This man's only piece of clothing, similar to the image of the African woman, is a piece of a blue and white striped cloth wrapped around his waist.

=== Mulattos/Mulacken ===
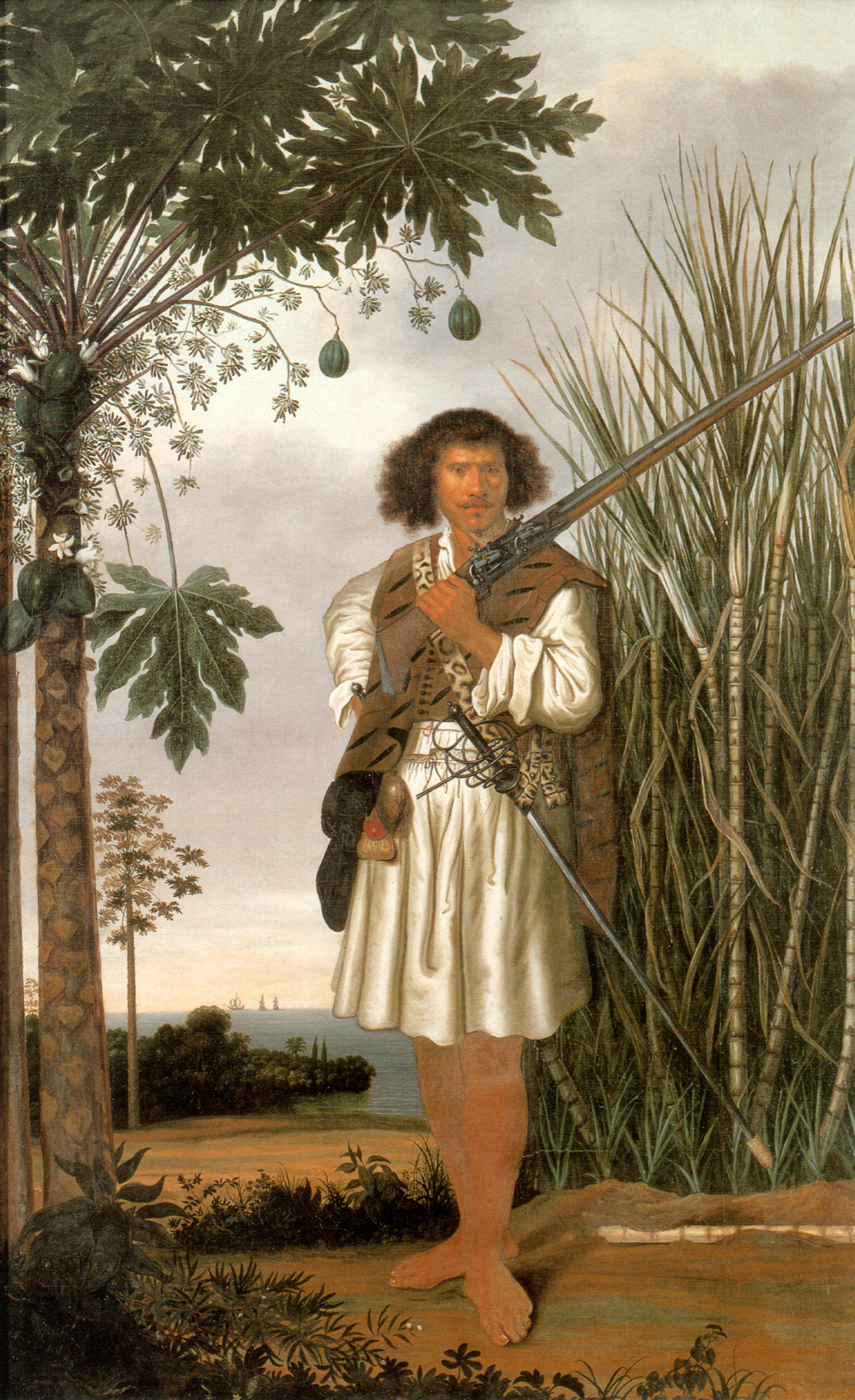
Mulatto Man

By the sixteenth century, the term mulatto, also referred as mulacken, was used in Portugal, Spain, and their colonial possessions to classify various people, often slaves and those of mixed racial background, on the basis of the color of their skin.

In Eckhout's image of the mulatto man, his weapons are visible as he stands in a three-quarter pose facing the viewer. Eckhout placed the man in a coastal setting against a cloudy grey sky with three European ships that are visible on the horizon. The man stands on the sandy ground, framed by a tall sugar cane field to the right and a large papaya tree to the left. His skin is a light brown color and much lighter than Eckhout's paintings of Amerindians and Africans. The uncontrollable halo of frizzy, dark-brown hair grows out of his head with his light brown eyes staring out to the viewer in a confident manner.

=== Mameluca ===
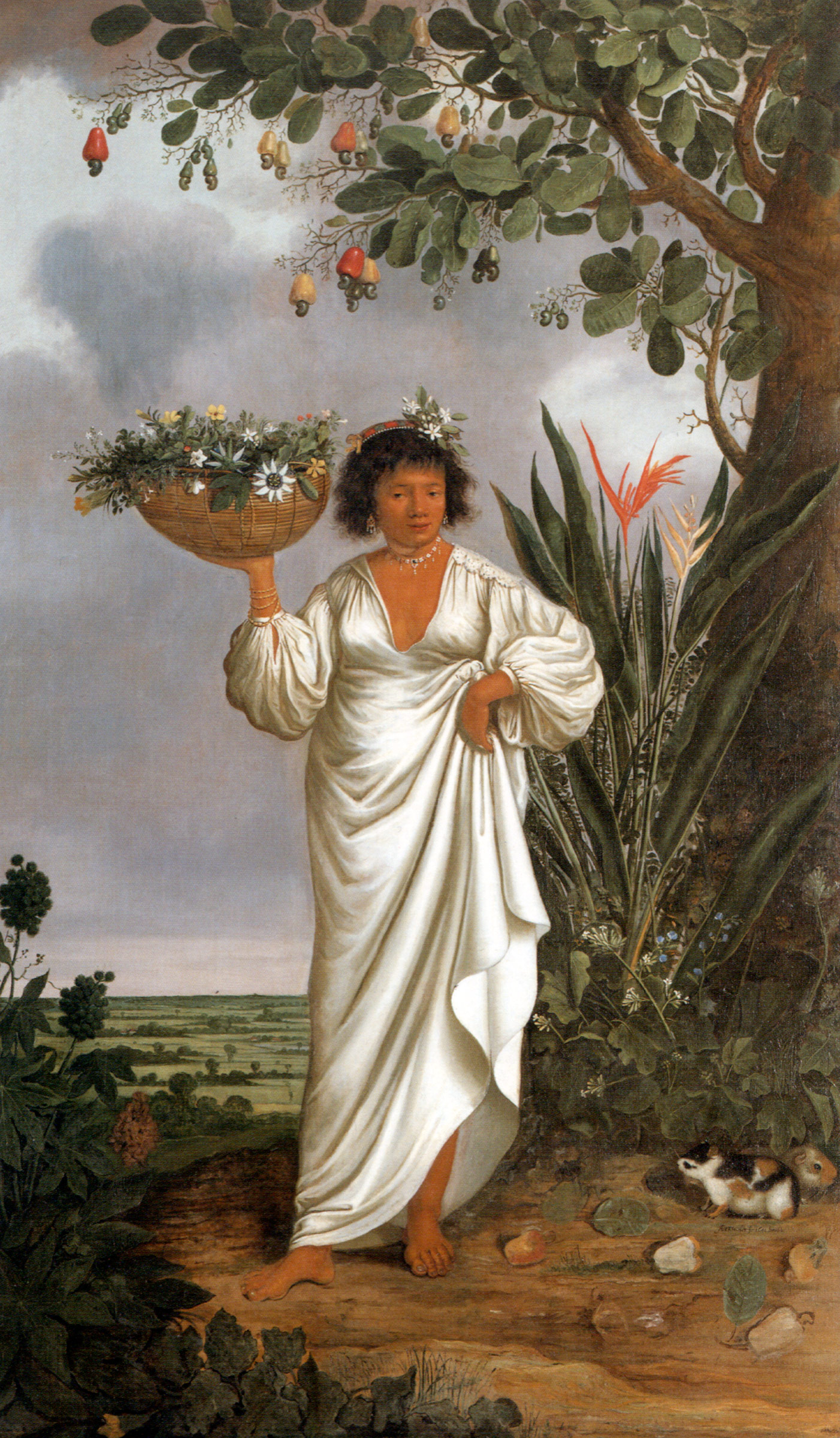
Mameluca woman under a fruiting cashew tree (1641-44)

The term mameluco is one that is used very little in Brazil, but like mulatto, mameluco can be traced back to Portuguese sources in the sixteenth century, following their establishment of a colonial outpost in Brazil. The first representation of a mameluco is in de Bry's version of Hans Staden's description of Brazil.

In Eckhout's painting of the mameluca woman, he presents a half-Brazilian and half-European woman holding a basket. Eckhout's depiction shows a woman in a flowing white dress balancing a basket of flowers in one hand. Her other hand is lifting her dress to reveal a small portion of her leg. This painting has many aspects that were characteristics of Eckhout's other paintings from his time in Brazil. The two guinea pigs at the woman's feet show his interest in the natural life of Brazil. In addition, the flowers she is carrying and the plant life around her were Eckhout's way of representing the fertility of Brazil, drawing attention to the successful production of crops there.

In the painting, the woman stands with a direct glance and a playful expression as she engages the viewer's eyes. The lips are slightly turned up at the ends assuming that she will soon break into a more fuller inviting smile. She wears jewels in her necklace and matching earrings. These are complemented by her small green hat, which is decorated with pearls and a sprig of orange tree blossoms. Her simple white dress is accompanies this finery, although its plainness is relieved on the shoulders by epaulettes of embroidery. This image of the mameluca refers to the fertility of the colony and even to the highly intoxicating cashew fruit wine that is made every year by the ethnic group of the mameluca mother, Tupinamba.

== Exhibition ==
In 2002, through a major restoration campaign, all of the well known paintings by Eckhout, have been allowed to travel back to Brazil. This is the first time they were exhibited in the country where they were made since the early 1640s. The title of the exhibition was Albert Eckhourt volta ao Brasil 1644-2002 (Albert Eckhout Returns to Brazil). The show was presented at the Instituto Ricardo Brennand in Recife, a building that had been newly erected in the city where Maurits lived during the height of his career. Eight of the still life's in this exhibition were meant to be seen from a low viewpoint and were intended to be hung above the men and women. Though at this time no exhibition curator has ever thought of hanging the paintings as a decorative ensemble.

== Gallery ==
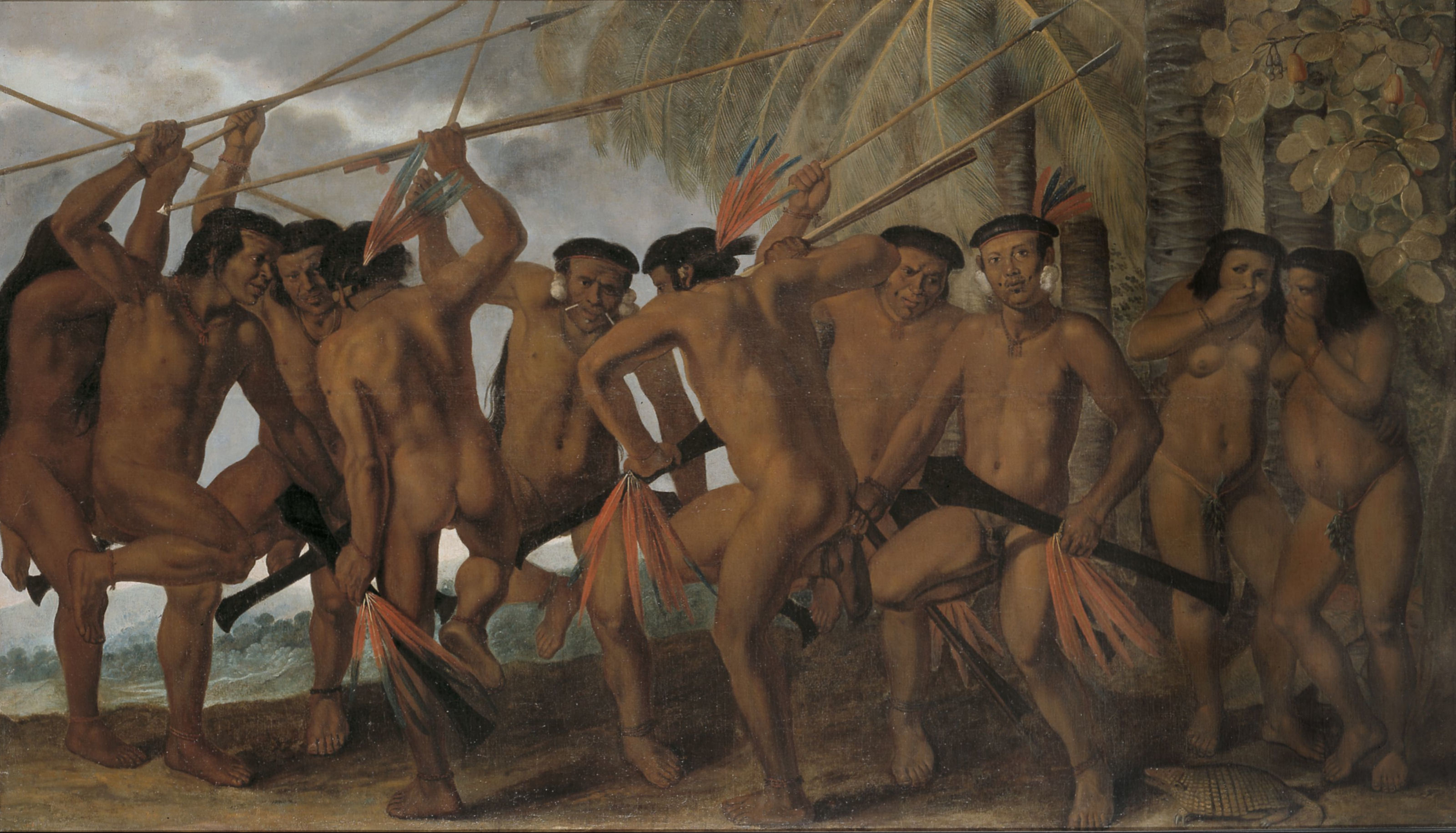
Tapuias dancing

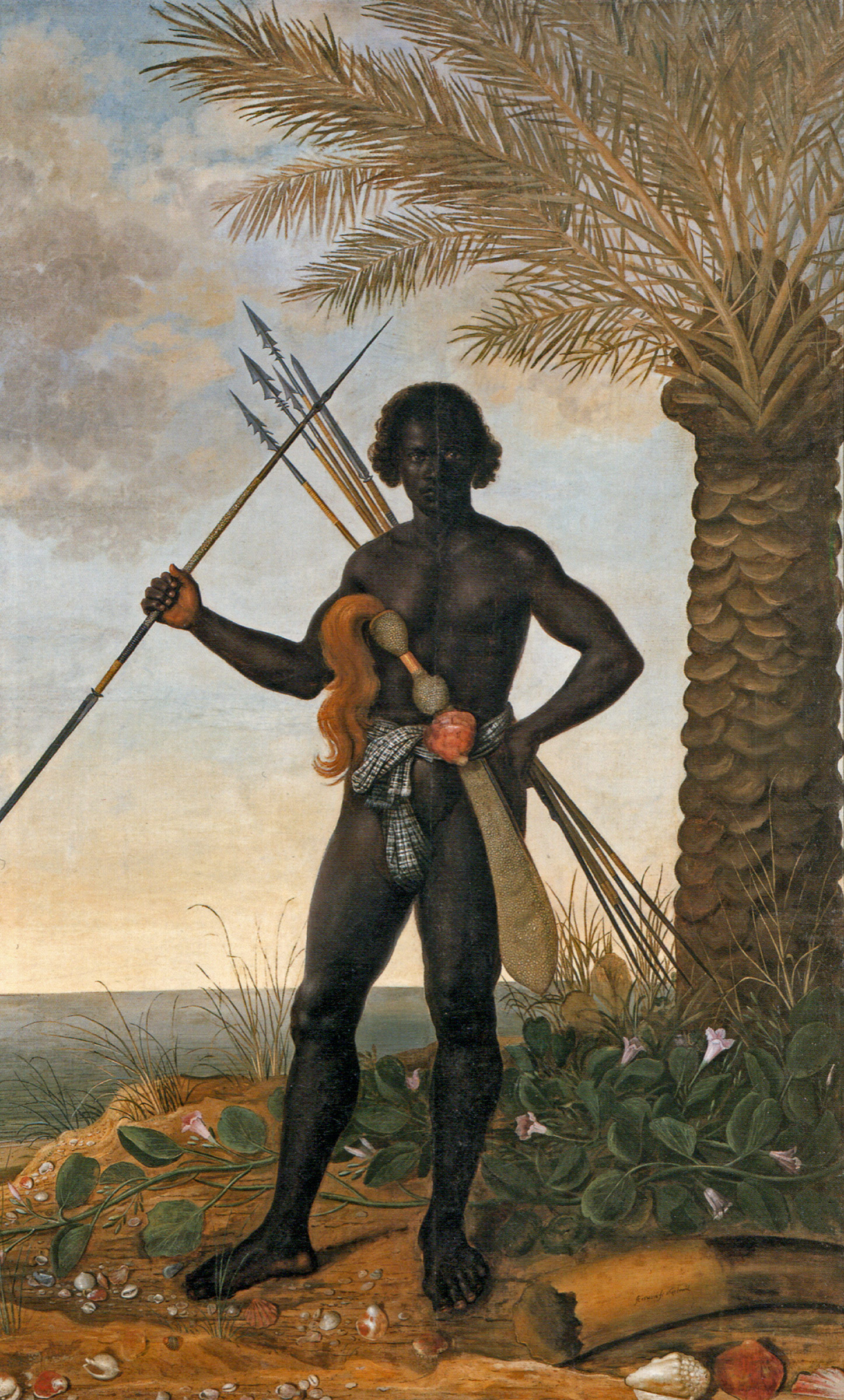
African warrior at the time of Ganga Zumba, leader of the Quilombo of Palmares

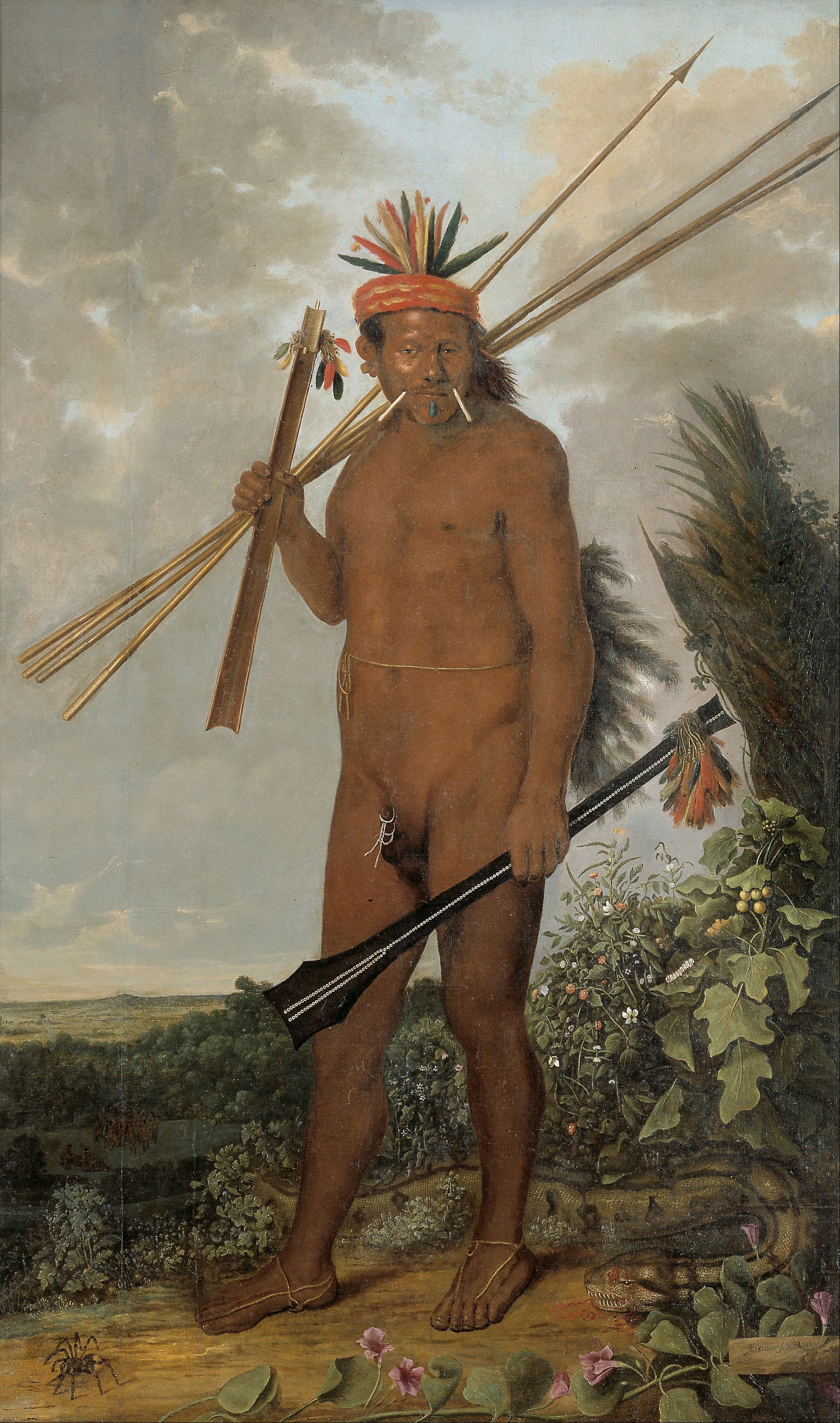
Brazilian Indian (Tarairiu) warrior

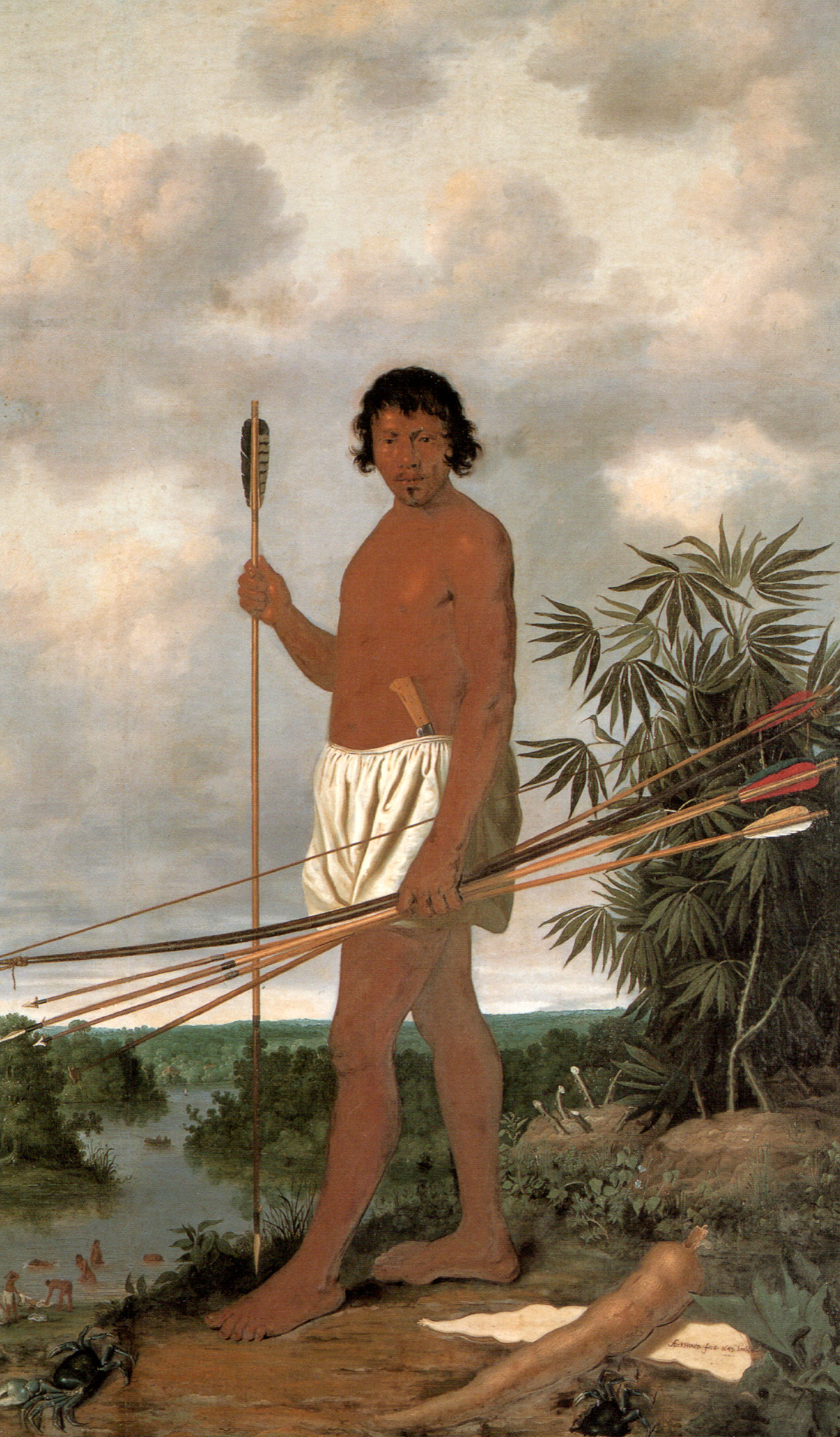
Brazilian warrior with traditional bow and arrows and a European knife

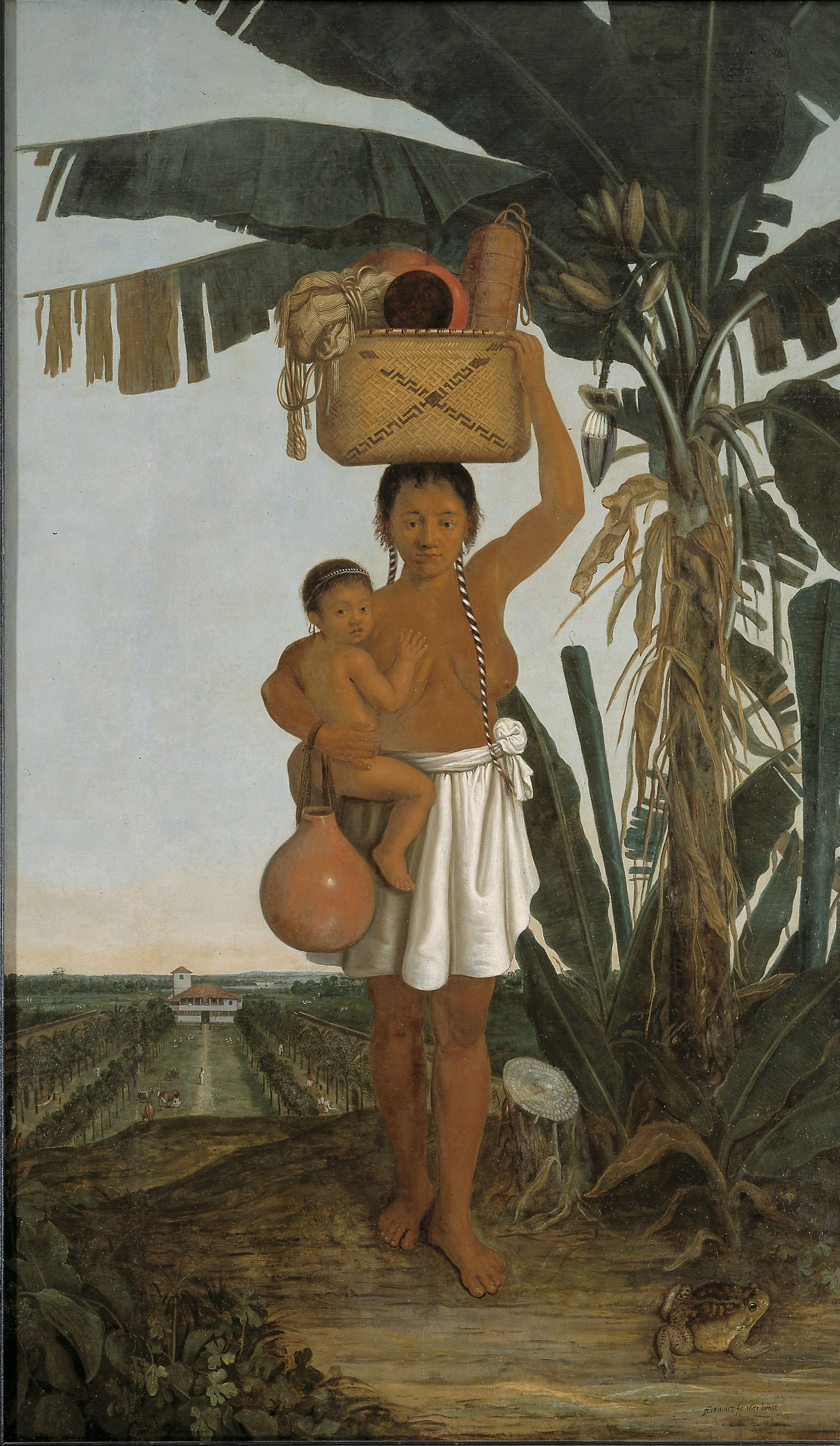
Tupian woman with baby, fruiting banana tree, and European plantation in background

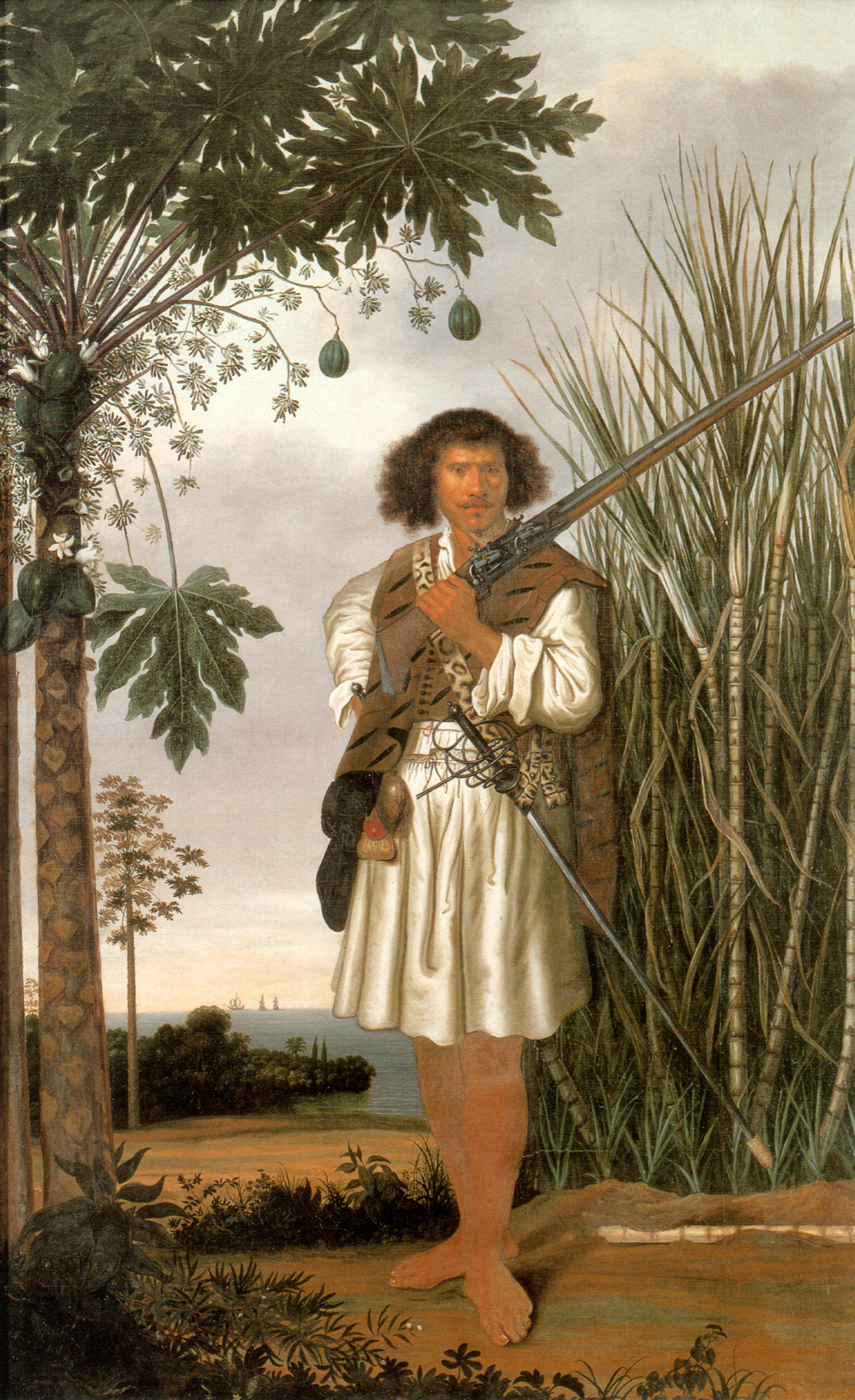
Mulatto man with gun and sword under a fruiting papaya tree

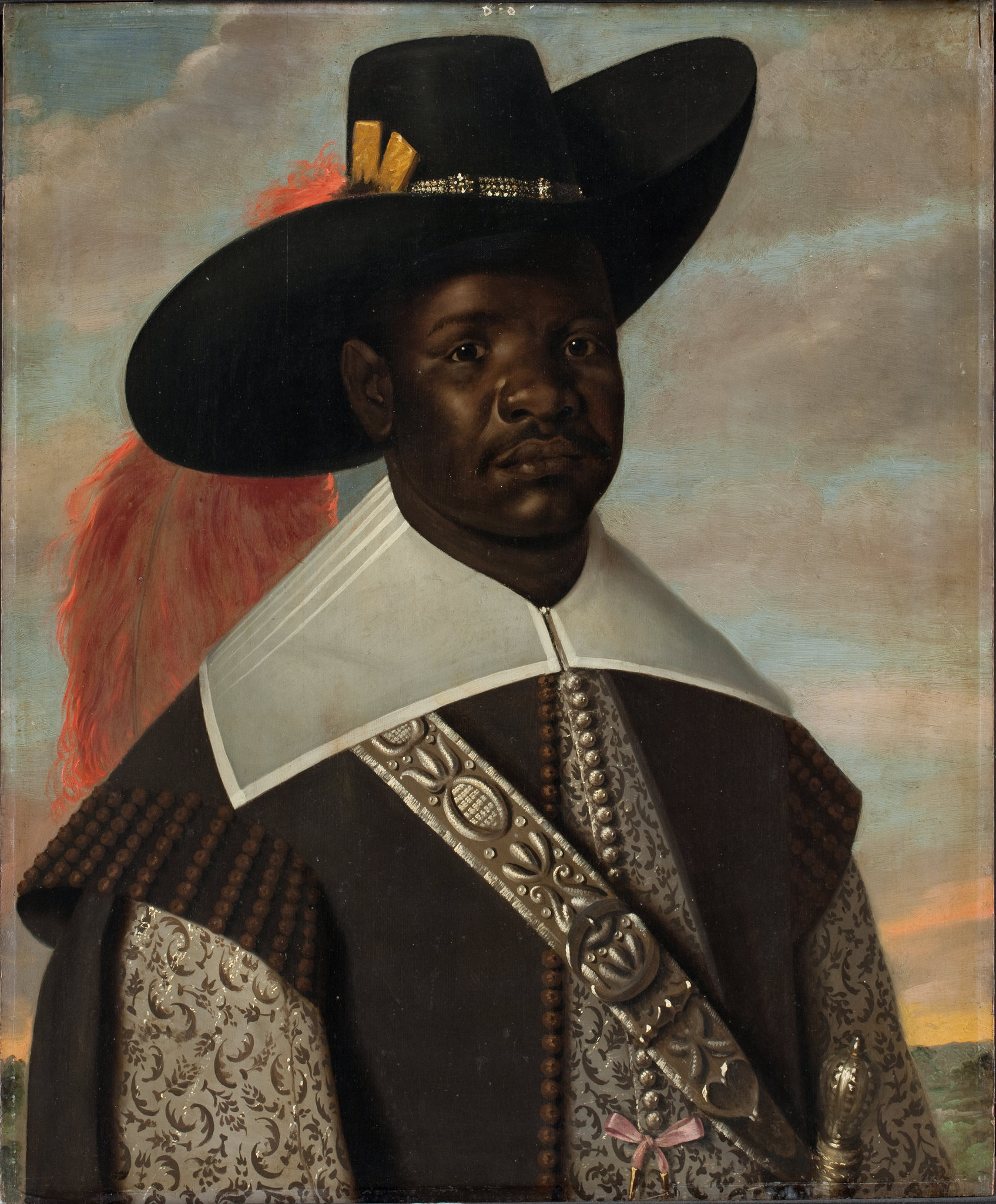
Portrait of Don Miguel de Castro, Emissary of Congo, originally attributed to Eckhout, but currently believed to be produced by one of the brothers Jasper or Jeronimus Becx

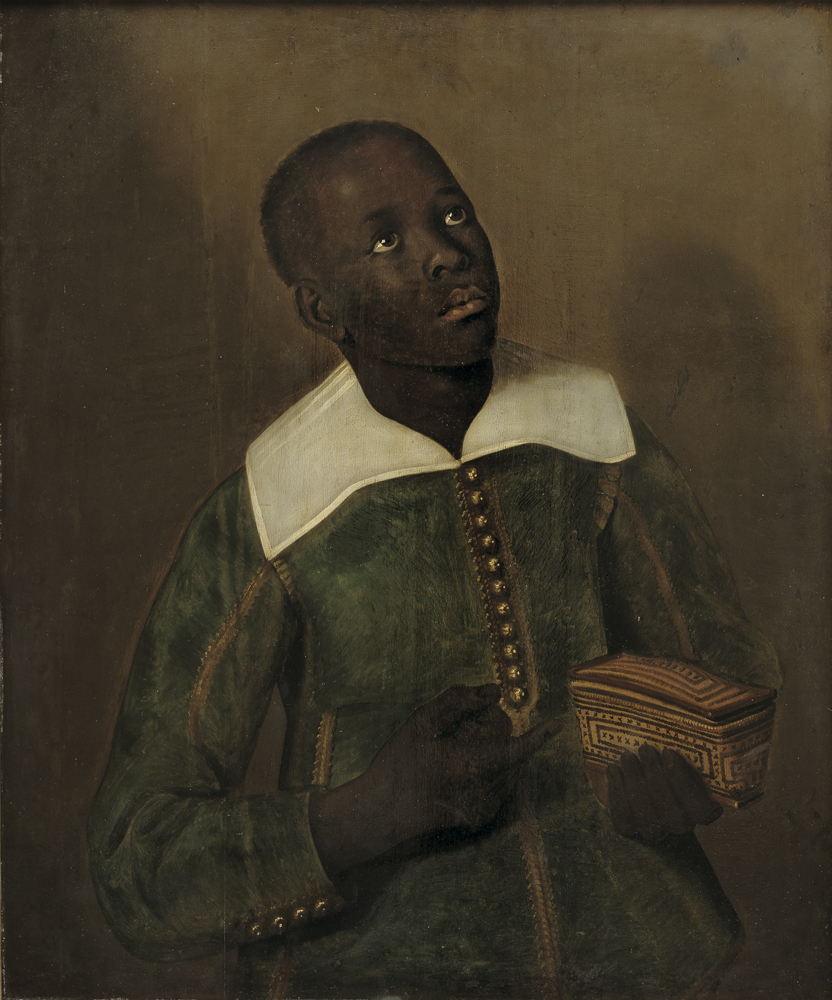
Servant of Dom Miguel de Castro with a decorated box, originally attributed to Eckhout, but currently believed to be produced by one of the brothers Jasper or Jeronimus Becx

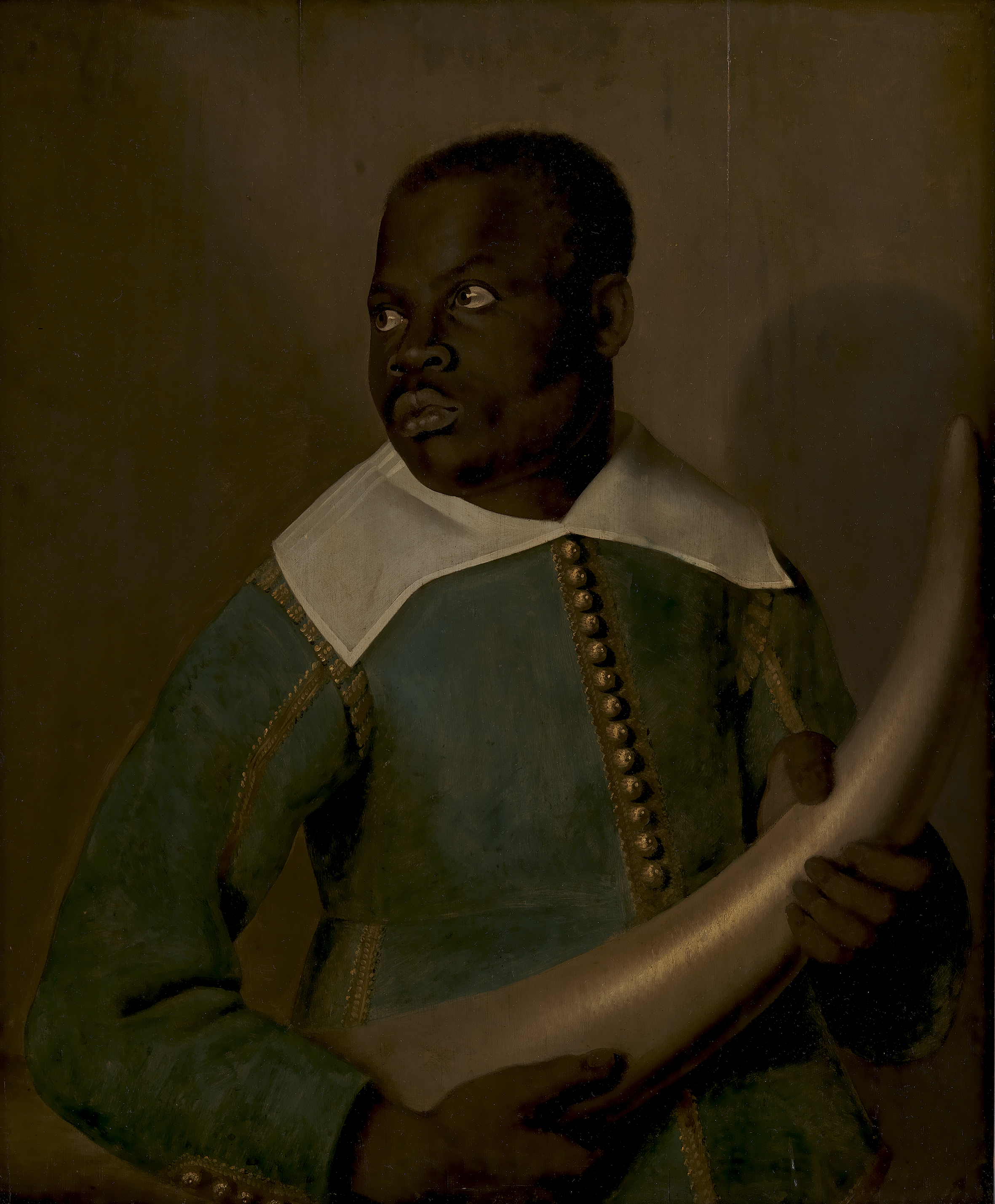
Servant of Dom Miguel de Castro with elephant tusk, originally attributed to Eckhout, but currently believed to be produced by one of the brothers Jasper or Jeronimus Becx

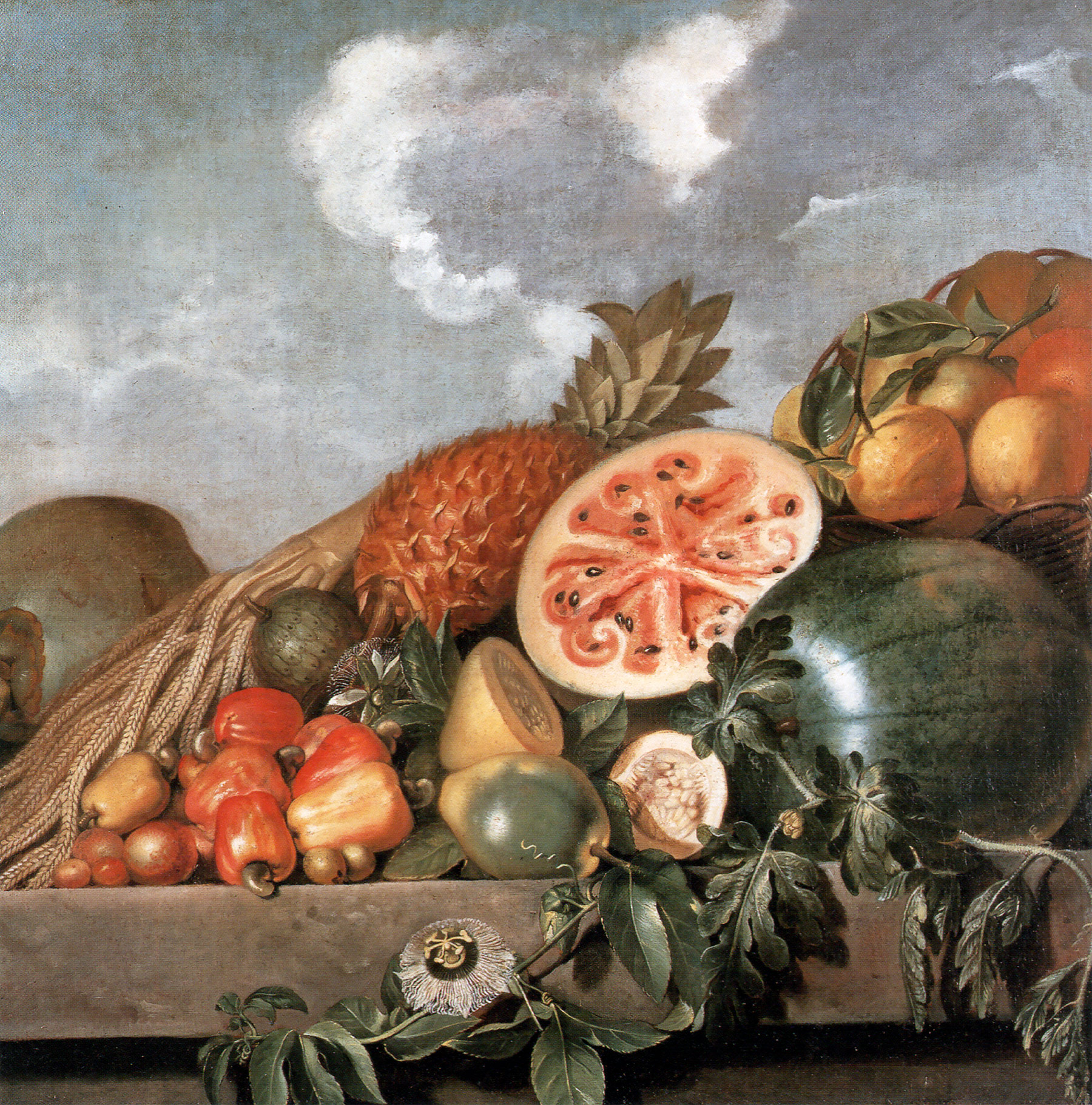
Still Life with Watermelons, Pineapple and Other Fruit

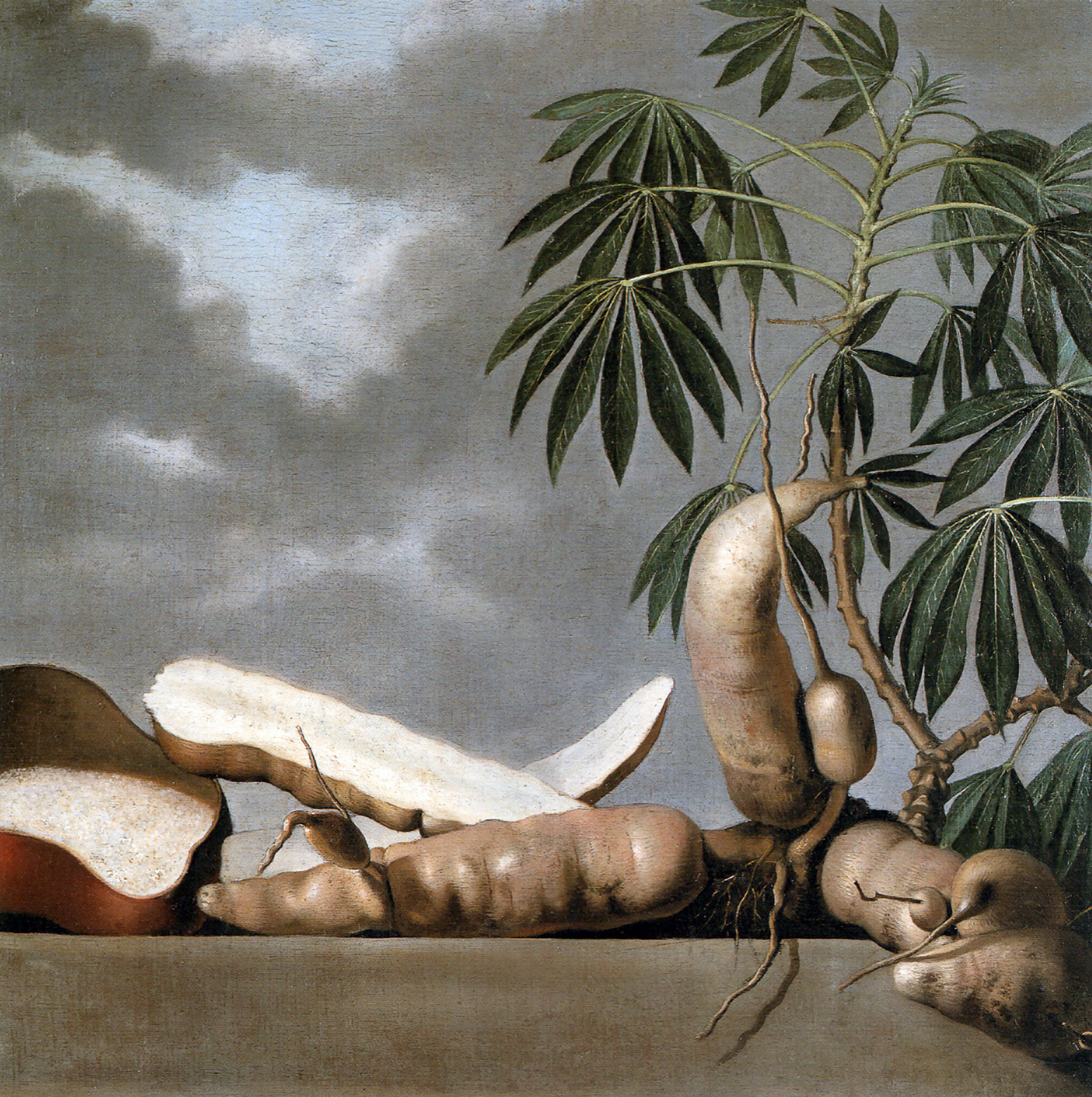
Still Life with Manioc

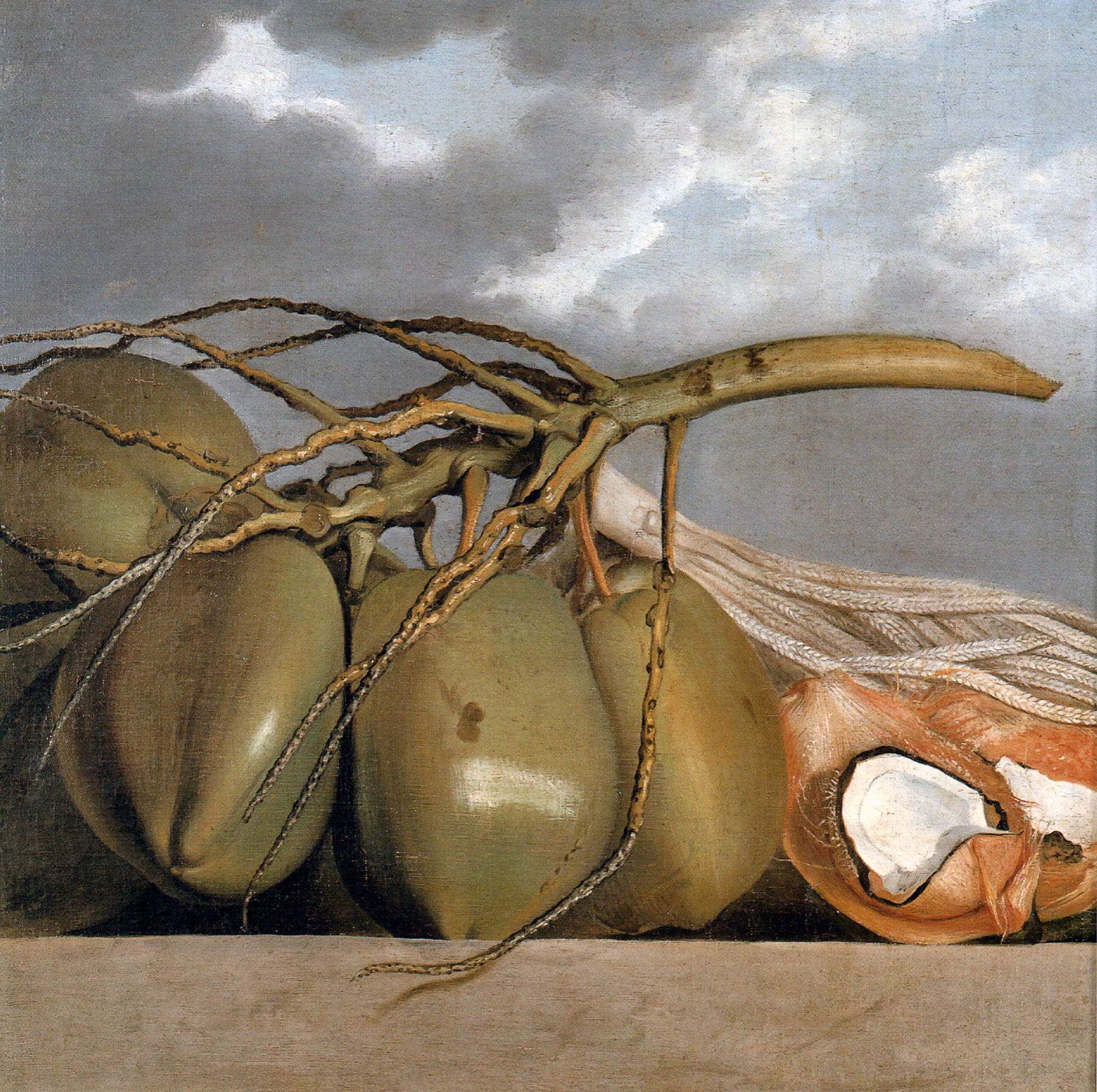
Still Life with coconuts

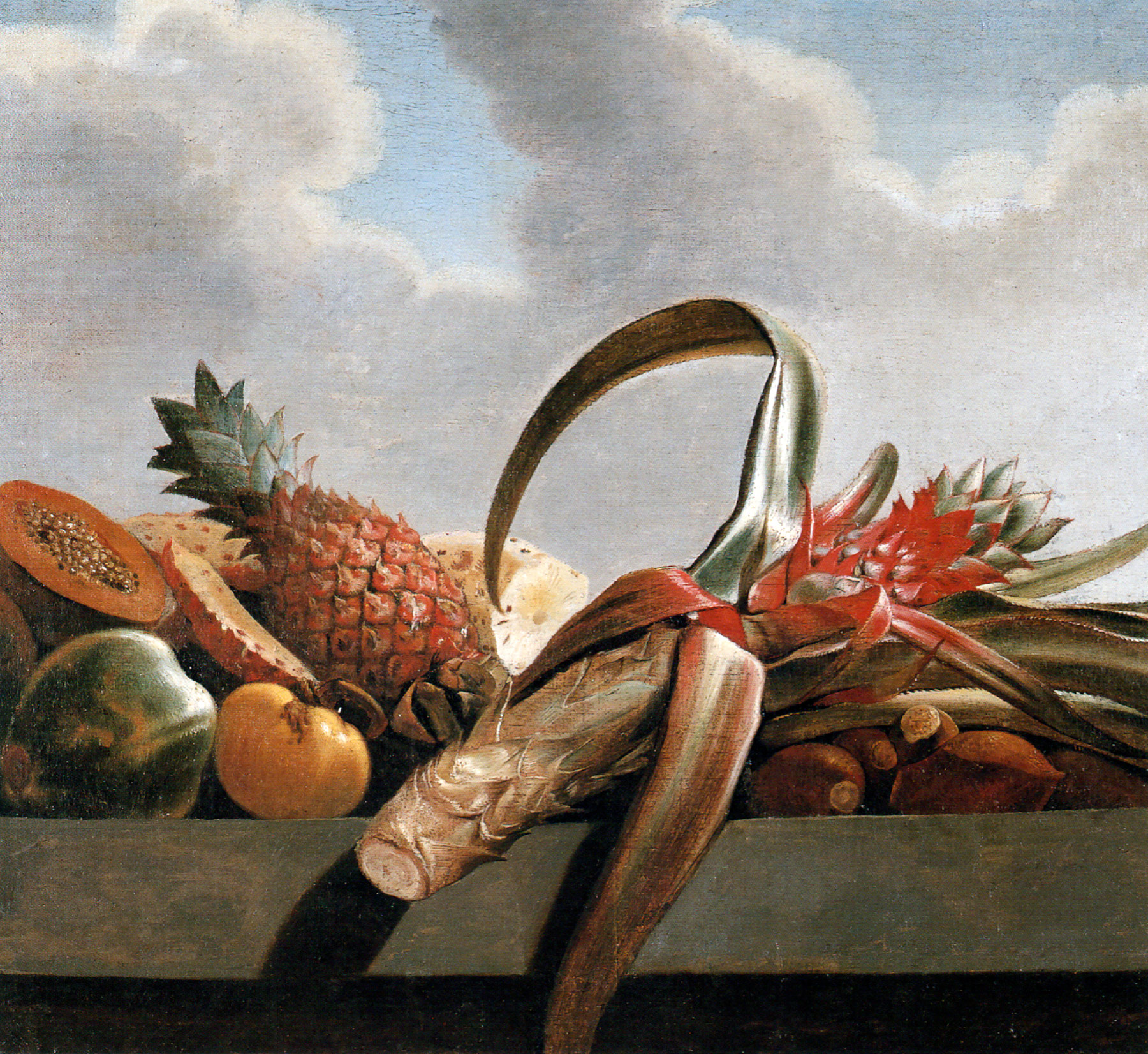
Pineapple, papaya, and other fruits

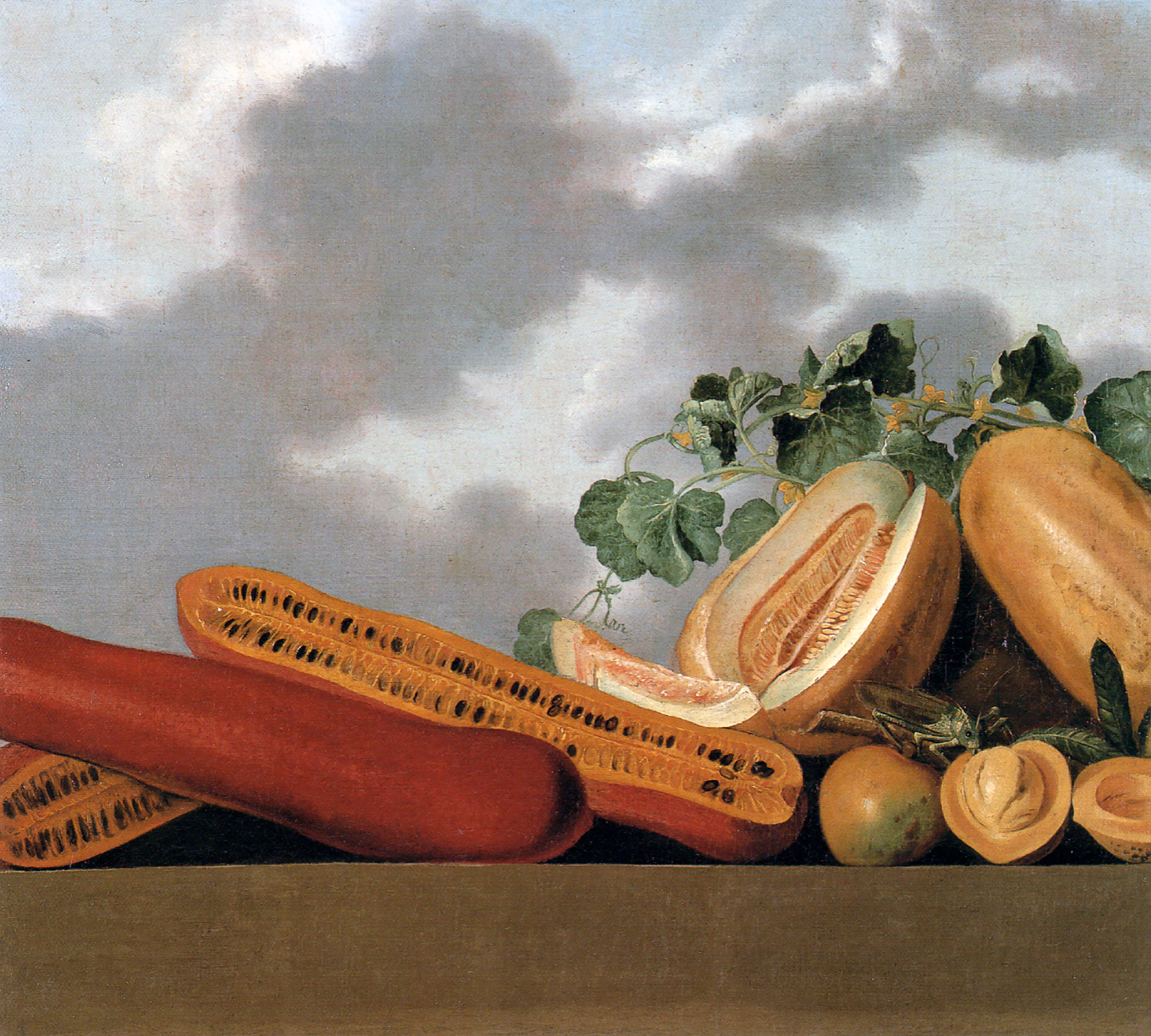
Pumpkins and melons

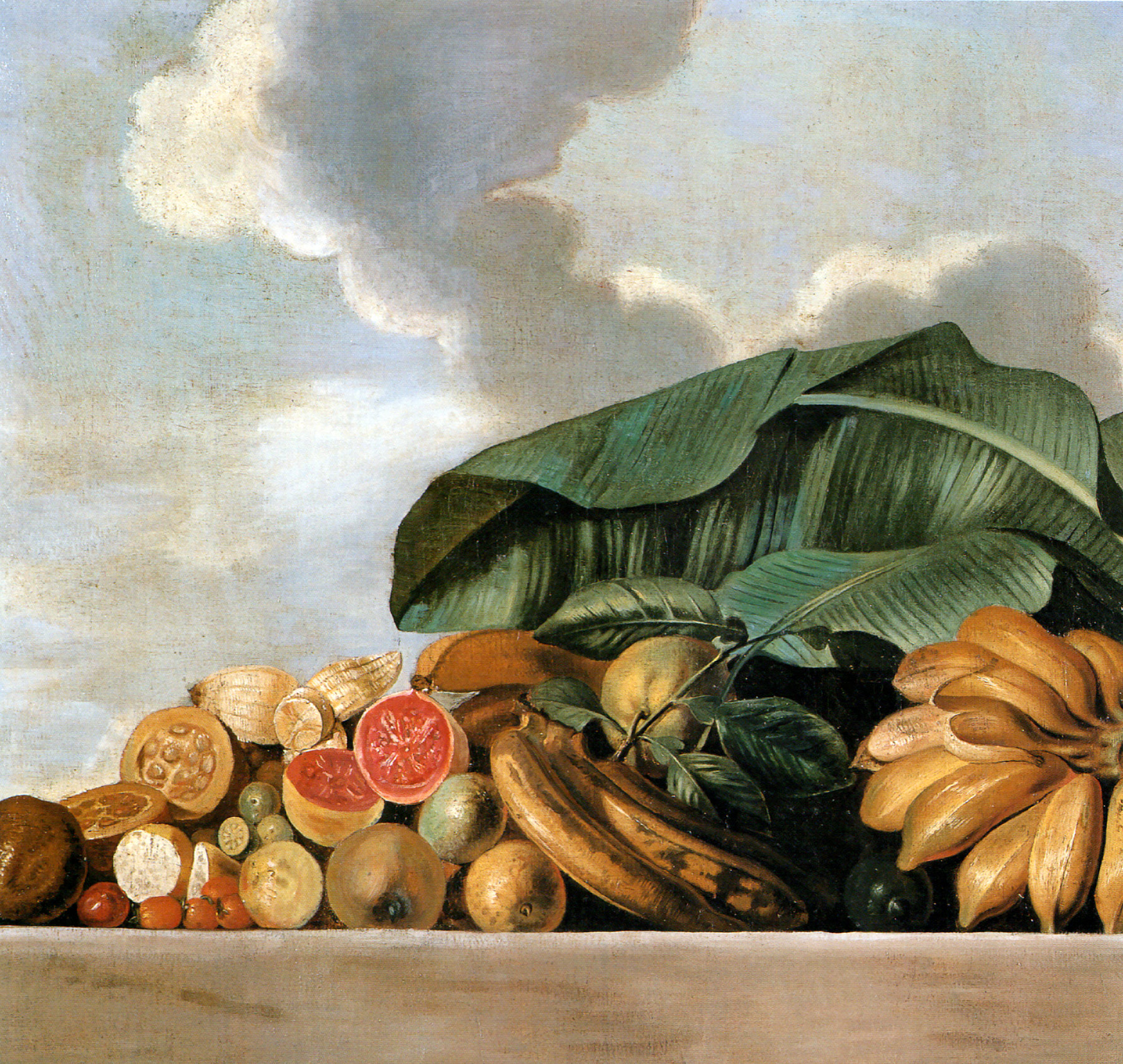
Bananas, guava, and other fruits

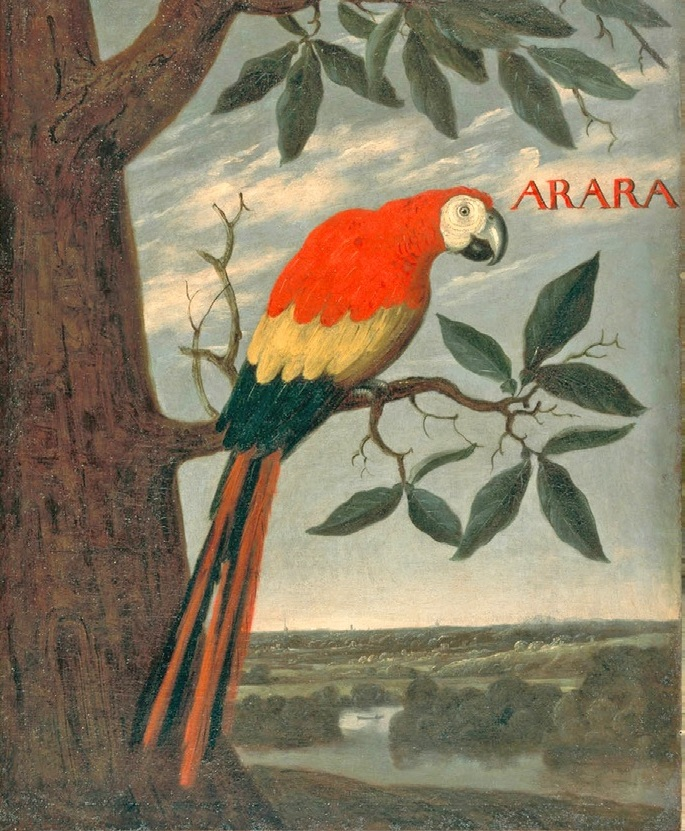

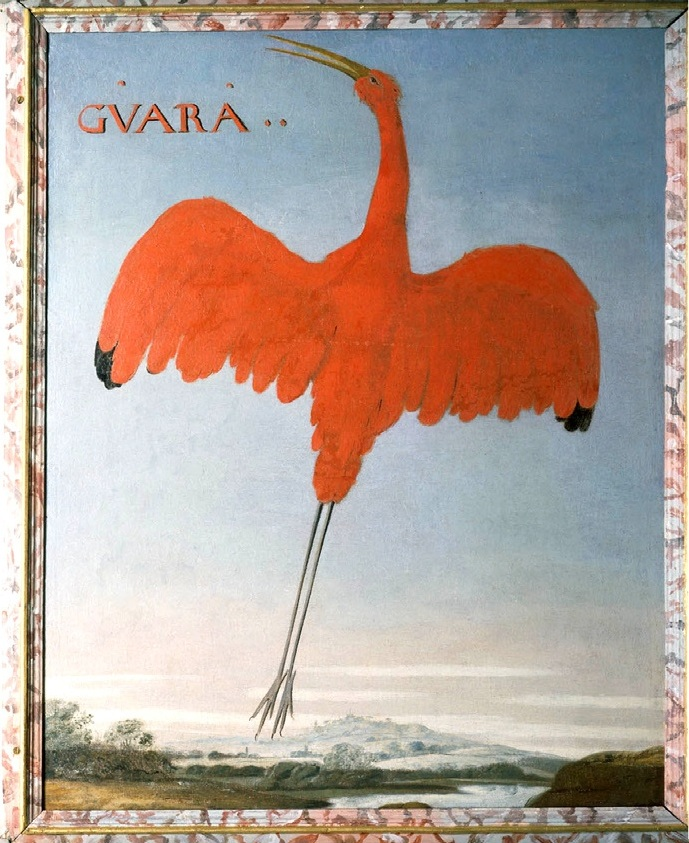

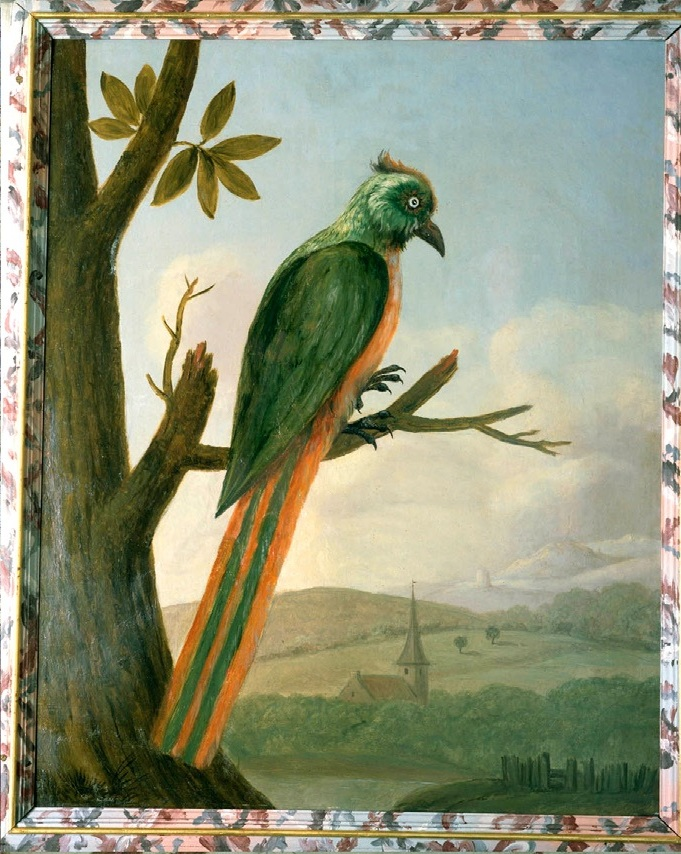

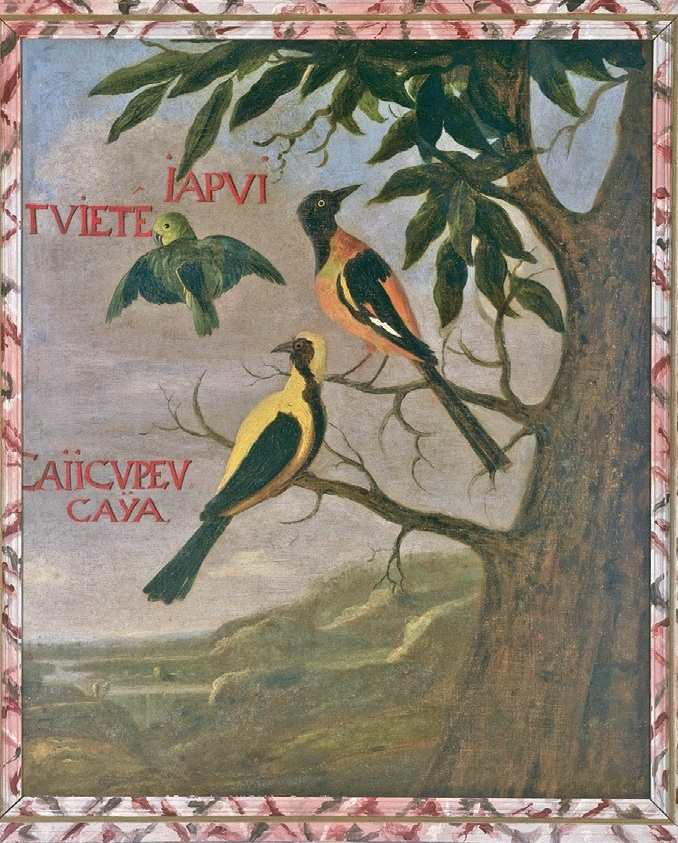

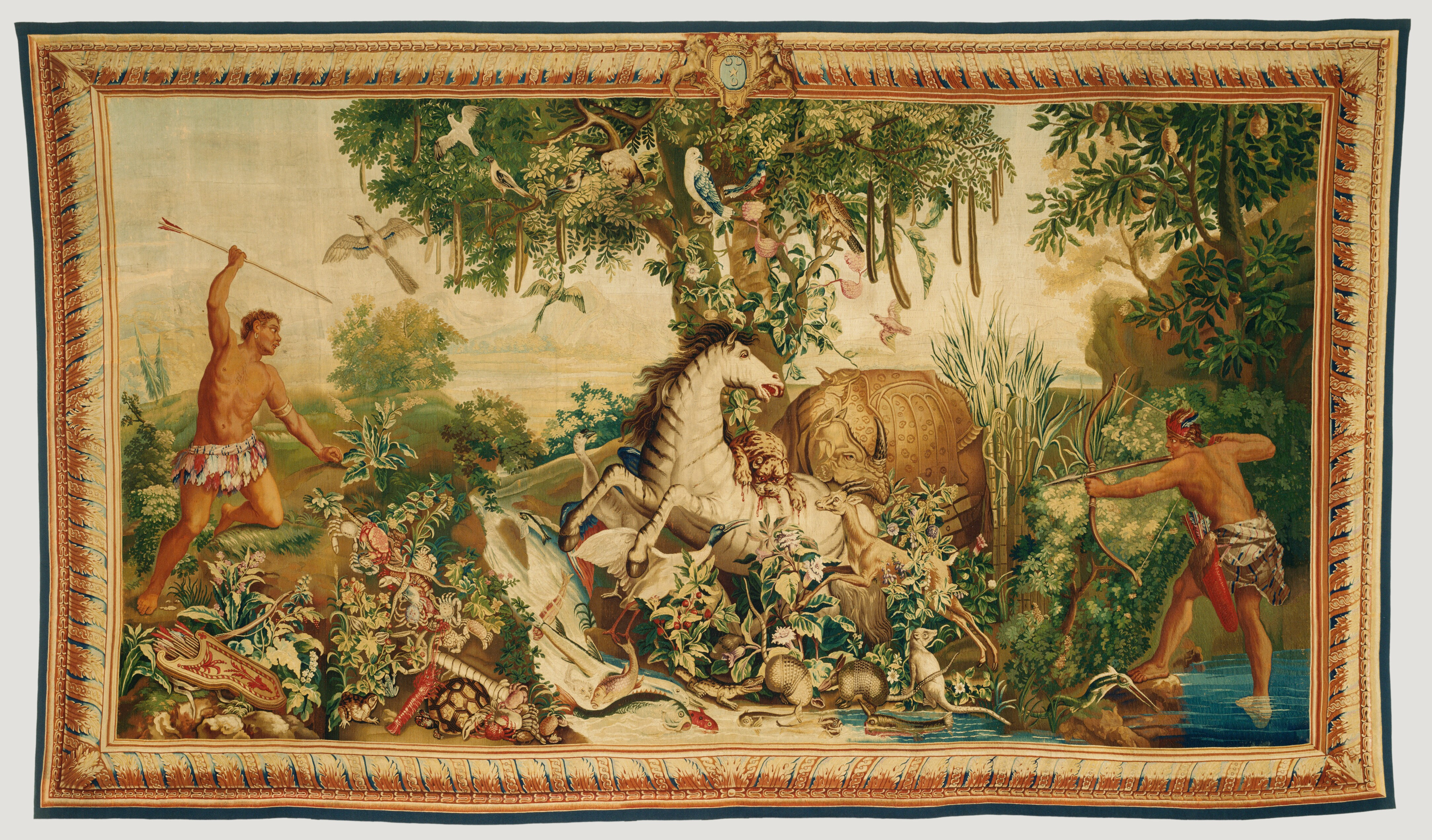
The Striped Horse from The Old Indies Series ca. 1690

== See also ==
- Colonial Brazil
- Dutch Brazil
- Dutch Golden Age painting
- Frans Post
- Johan Maurits van Nassau-Siegen
