= Demographics of the Southern Cone =

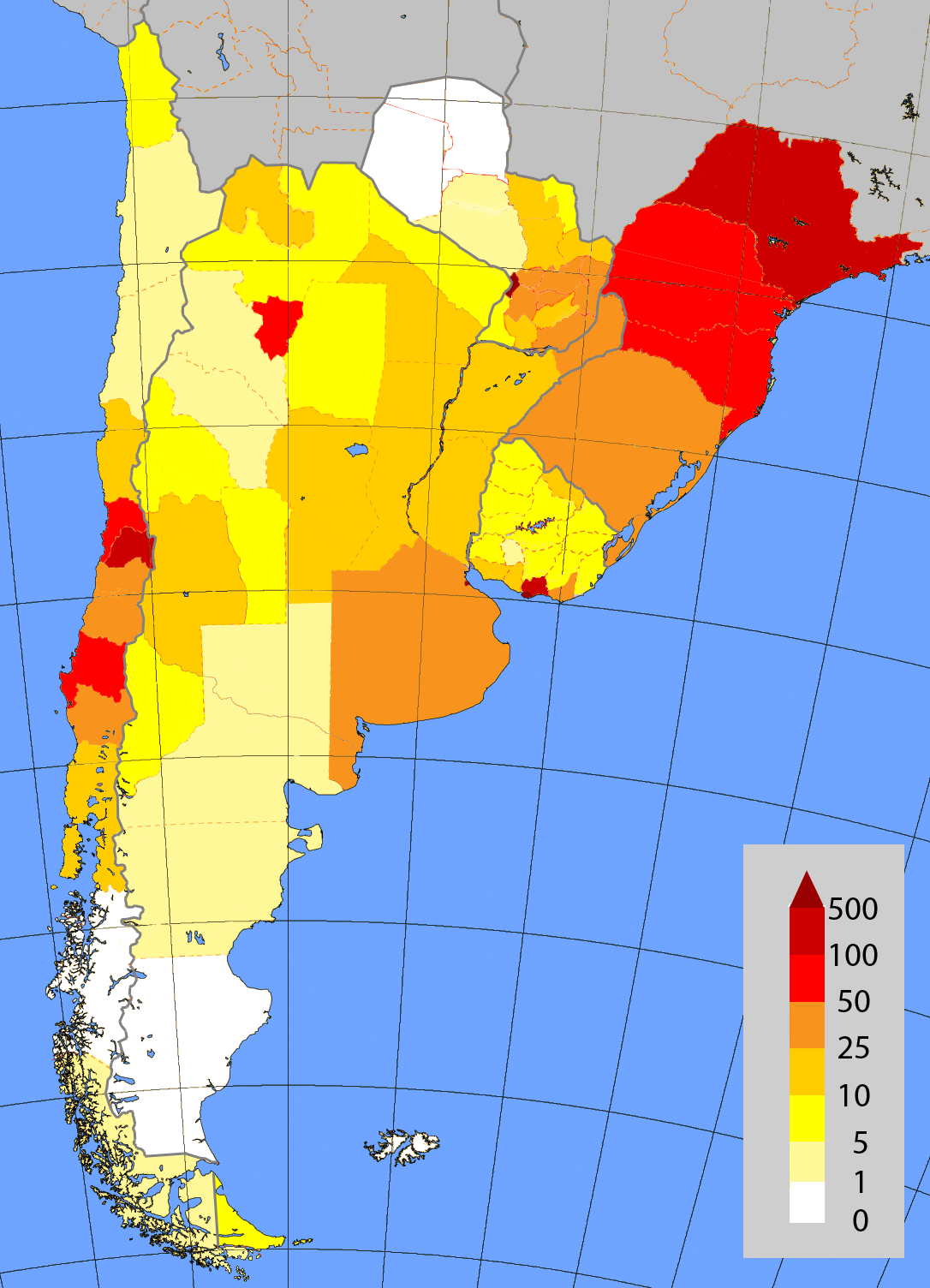
Population density of the Southern Cone by first level national administrative divisions. Population/km^{2}

The Southern Cone (Spanish: Cono Sur, Portuguese: Cone Sul) is a geographic region composed of the southernmost areas of South America, mostly south of the Tropic of Capricorn. Although geographically this includes parts of Southern and Southeastern (São Paulo), Brazil, and Paraguay, in terms of political geography the Southern Cone has traditionally comprised Argentina, Chile, and Uruguay.

The population of Argentina, Chile and Uruguay is 40, 17.5 and 3.6 million respectively. Buenos Aires is the largest metropolitan area at 13.1 million and Santiago, Chile has 6.4 million. When part of Southeastern Brazil is included, São Paulo is the largest city, with 19.8 million; in the Southern Brazil, the largest metropolitan area is Porto Alegre, with more than 4 million. Uruguay's capital and largest city, Montevideo, has 1.8 million, and it receives many visitors on ferry boats across the Río de la Plata from Buenos Aires, 50 km (31 mi) away. Asunción, Paraguay's capital city, has a population of 2.1 million.

== Ethnicity ==
Ethno-racial groups in Argentina (2022 census)
1. No data (mainly Whites and Mestizos) (96.5%)
2. Natives (2.80%)
3. Blacks (0.70%)
Ethno-racial groups in Chile (2024 census)
1. No data (mainly Whites and Mestizos) (87.7%)
2. Natives (12.4%)
3. Blacks (0.94%)
Ethno-racial groups in Uruguay (2011 census)
1. Whites (87.7%)
2. No data (mainly Mestizos and Mulattos) (5.00%)
3. Blacks (4.60%)
4. Natives (2.40%)
5. East Asians (0.20%)
6. Other (0.10%)
Ethno-racial groups in Paraguay (2022 census)
1. No data (mainly Mestizos and Whites) (97.6%)
2. Natives (2.30%)
3. Blacks (0.10%)
Ethno-racial groups in the South Region (2022 census)
1. Whites (72.6%)
2. Pardos (Mixed) (21.7%)
3. Blacks (5.00%)
4. East Asians (0.40%)
5. Natives (0.30%)
Ethno-racial groups in São Paulo (2022 census)
1. Whites (57.8%)
2. Pardos (Mixed) (33.0%)
3. Blacks (8.00%)
4. East Asians (1.10%)
5. Natives (0.10%)

As far as ethnicity is concerned, the population of the Southern Cone was largely influenced by immigration from Europe. Whites and mestizo make up 97% of the total population of Argentina, Chile, Uruguay and Southern Brazil. Mestizos make up 15.8% of the population, being a majority in Paraguay. Native Americans make up 3% of the population and mulattoes (0.2%) and Asians (1.0%), mostly in Southern Brazil and Uruguay, the remaining 1.2%.

Argentina, along with other areas of new settlement like Canada, Australia, Brazil or the United States is considered a country of immigrants and a melting pot of different peoples, both autochthonous and immigrants. Most Argentines are descendants of colonial-era settlers and of the 19th and 20th century immigrants from Europe, with 97% of the population being of European and mestizo descent for generations, the majority of these immigrants came from Italy and Spain, as well as other European countries. The last national census, based on self-identification, counted about 600,000 Argentines (1.6%) of Amerindian heritage. A further 3–4% of Argentines were of Arabic or East Asian extraction. A study conducted on 218 individuals in 2010 by the Argentine geneticist Daniel Corach, has established that the genetic map of Argentina is composed by 79% from different European ethnicities (mainly Spanish and Italian ethnicities), 18% of different indigenous ethnicities, and 4.3% of African ethnic groups, in which 63.6% of the tested group had at least one ancestor who was Indigenous. Genetics studies:

- Homburguer et al., 2015, PLOS One Genetics: 67% European, 28% Amerindian, 4% African and 1,4% Asian.
- Avena et al., 2012, PLOS One Genetics: 65% European, 31% Amerindian, and 4% African.
  - Buenos Aires Province: 76% European and 24% others.
  - South Zone (Chubut Province): 54% European and 46% others.
  - Northeast Zone (Misiones, Corrientes, Chaco & Formosa provinces): 54% European and 46% others.
  - Northwest Zone (Salta Province): 33% European and 67% others.
- Oliveira, 2008, on Universidade de Brasília: 60% European, 31% Amerindian and 9% African.
- National Geographic: 52% European, 27% Amerindian ancestry, 9% African and 9% others.

Recent censuses in Brazil are conducted on the basis of self-identification. In the 2000 census, 53% of Brazilians (approximately 93 million people in 2000; around 100 million as of 2006) were white and 39% pardo or multiracial Brazilians. White is applied as a term to people of European descent (including European Jews), and Middle Easterners of all faiths. According to IBGE (Brazilian Institute of Geography and Statistics), Pardo is a broad classification that encompasses Brazilians of mixed race ancestry, mulattoes, and assimilated indigenous people ("caboclos"). The geneticist Sérgio Pena criticised foreign scholar Edward Telles for lumping "blacks" and "pardos" in the same category, given the predominant European ancestry of the "pardos" throughout Brazil. According to him, "the autosomal genetic analysis that we have performed in non related individuals from Rio de Janeiro shows that it does not make any sense to put "blacks" and "pardos" in the same category".

An autosomal DNA study from 2014 found out Chile to be 44.34% (± 3.9%) Native American, 57.85% (± 5.44%) European and 1.28% (± 0.45%) African.

In 2009, Chile had an estimated population of 16,970,000, of which approximately 8.8 million or 52,7% are European, with mestizos estimated at 44%. Other studies found a white majority of 64% to 90% of the Chilean population. From Chile's various waves of immigrants Spanish, Italians, Irish, French, Greeks, Germans, English, Scots and Croats communities. The largest ethnic group in Chile arrived from Spain and the Basque regions in the south of France. Estimates of the number of descendants from Basques in Chile range from 10% (1,600,000) to as high as 27% (4,500,000). Furthermore, Chile is the country with the highest number of people of British origin in Latin America, which is reflected in certain costumes, habits and the historical good relation between Chile and Great Britain. In 1848 an important and substantial German immigration took place, laying the foundation for the German-Chilean community. The German Embassy in Chile estimated 500,000 to 600,000 Chileans are of German origin. Although if we count the total number of immigrants of Germanic origin, like Austrians and especially German Bohemians the number would rise up to 1,000,000 people. Other historically significant immigrant groups include: Croatia whose number of descendants today is estimated to be 800.000 persons, the equivalent of 7% of the population. Other authors claim, on the other hand, that close to 9.6% of the Chilean population must have some Croatian ancestry. Over 700,000 Chileans may have British (English, Scottish and Welsh) origin. 4,5% of Chile's population., Chileans of Greek descent are estimated 90,000 to 120,000. Most of them live either in the Santiago area or in the Antofagasta area. Chile is one of the 5 countries with the most descendants of Greeks in the world. The descendants of Swiss add 90,000, an estimated that about 5% of the Chilean population has some French ancestry. and 600,000 to 800,000 Italians.

In the case of Uruguay, the majority of the population is of Spanish and Italian descent. The indigenous populations are now extinct, yet retains a visible minority with mestizos and blacks making up 12% of the population.

A 2009 DNA study in the American Journal of Human Biology showed the genetic composition of Uruguay as primarily European, with Native American ancestry ranging from one to 20 percent and sub-Saharan African from seven to 15 percent (depending on region).

Meanwhile, although the majority of the population of Paraguay is composed of mestizos (mixed European & Amerindian), the European contribution has impacted significantly. It is not uncommon for the admixture in their mestizos to lean more towards the European element, as opposed to a relatively equal amount of both in the rest of Latin America, and in some cases it is the only discernible element. This situation has led to the often contentious question on the proportion of white people. Paraguay has an undetermined number of unmixed Europeans, as well as a visible Amerindian minority. The number of people of European descent in Paraguay is not greater than 20% and the vast majority of Paraguay is not inhabited by peoples of European descent.

== Racial demography ==
Since interethnic marriages are widespread in Latin America, complex ethnic classifications emerged, including 16 racial categories created in 18th century Hispanic America, including terms like castizo, morisco, cambujo and ahí te estás. In Brazil, about 190 "racial" categories were detected by the Census of 1976.

Chile does not ask its citizens about race, but some studies concluded that Whites make up the majority would exceed 52,7% to 64% of the Chilean population. Other study conducted by the University of Chile found that within the Chilean population 60% are white, the mestizos predominantly white ancestry is estimated at 35% while the CIA World Factbook describes 95.4% of the population as white and mestizo.

Different ethnic groups contributed for the composition of the population of the Southern Cone. The original population, the Amerindians, was in large part exterminated. As in the rest of Latin America, in the first centuries of colonization the region was settled by Spanish and Portuguese colonizers and most of them were men. Soon after their arrival, an intensive mixture between those European men and the local Amerindian women began, producing a new population named Mestizo in Hispanophone countries and Caboclo or Mameluco in Brazil. Amerindian ancestry is widespread in the region, mostly through the maternal line, while European ancestry is mostly found on the paternal line. African ancestry is mostly found in Brazil.

A genetic study concluded that the dominant female ancestry found in Argentina is of Amerindian origin (60% of Amerindian lineages found among Northern and Southern Argentines, and 50% among Central Argentines). A different study concluded that 56% of the European descent population in Buenos Aires have some degree of DNA indicating Amerindian ancestry, while 42% have European DNA in both parental lineages. Another study found that 2 million Argentines have a small variation of African ancestry and that 10% of the population of Buenos Aires have some degree in African DNA. In a sample from Montevideo, capital of Uruguay, Amerindian DNA was found in 20.4% of the population. The Chilean population low genetic studies "the use of mitochondrial DNA and Y chromosome test results show the following: The European component is predominant in the Chilean upper class, the middle classes, 72.3%–76.8% European component and 27.7%–23.2 of mixed aboriginal and lower classes at 62.9%–65% European component and 37.1%–35% mix of Aboriginal.

A autosomal DNA study from 2011, with nearly 1000 samples from all over Brazil ("whites", "pardos" and "blacks"), found out a major European contribution, followed by a high African contribution and an important Native American component. "In all regions studied, the European ancestry was predominant, with proportions ranging from 60.6% in the Northeast to 77.7% in the South". The 2011 autosomal study samples came from blood donors (the lowest classes constitute the great majority of blood donors in Brazil), and also public health institutions personnel and health students. The study showed that Brazilians from different regions are more homogenous than previously thought by some based on the census alone. "Brazilian homogeneity is, therefore, a lot greater between Brazilian regions than within Brazilians region".

Region	European	African	Native American
Northern Brazil	68,80%	10,50%	18,50%
Northeast of Brazil	60,10%	29,30%	8,90%
Southeast Brazil	74,20%	17,30%	7,30%
Southern Brazil	79,50%	10,30%	9,40%

Similar to the rest of Latin America, the genetic ancestry of the population of the Southern Cone reflects the History of the continent: the Iberian colonizers were mostly men who arrived without women. In consequence, they had children with the local Amerindian women or with African female slaves. The intense European immigration to this part of the World in the late 19th and early 20th centuries (particularly to Argentina, Uruguay, Chile and Southern Brazil) brought more European components to the local population (mainly Spaniards in Chile, Italians and Spanish in Argentina and Uruguay, while Italians and Germans in southern Brazil and Patagonia). European immigration was encouraged by local governments, among other reasons, to "whiten" the local population, which reflected the scientific racism that considered the Amerindian and African elements "inferior", while the European element was seen as "superior". As a consequence, Whites came to dominate these areas that received larger numbers of European immigrants. But the predominantly non-White majority before the mass European immigration did not disappear, and was largely assimilated into the White population.
