= Pardo Brazilians =

Ethnicity in South America

Brasileiros pardos (Portuguese)
- Proportion of Pardo Brazilians in each municipality as of the 2022 Brazilian census

Total population
- Mixed ancestry predominates ▲92,083,286 (2022 census) ▲45.34% of the Brazilian population

Regions with significant populations
- Entire country; highest percentages found in the North and Northeast regions
- (São Paulo (state)) São Paulo: 12,122,836
- Minas Gerais: 8,736,860
- Bahia: 8,335,917
- (Rio de Janeiro (state)) Rio de Janeiro: 6,332,408
- Ceará: 5,268,305
- Pernambuco: 4,886,026
- Maranhão: 4,470,000

Languages
- Portuguese

Religion
- 74% Roman Catholic · 18.2% Protestant · 5.6% irreligious · 2% other denominations (Kardecist, Umbanda, Candomblé)

Related ethnic groups
- Brazilians: White Brazilians; Black Brazilians; Native Brazilians; East Asian Brazilians

In Brazil, Pardo (Portuguese pronunciation: [ˈpaʁdu]) is an ethno-racial and skin color category used by the Brazilian Institute of Geography and Statistics (IBGE) in the Brazilian censuses. The term "pardo" is a complex one, more commonly used to refer to Brazilians of mixed ethnic ancestries.

Pardo Brazilians represent a diverse range of skin colors and ethnic backgrounds. The other recognized census categories are branco ("white"), preto ("black"), amarelo ("yellow", meaning ethnic East Asians), and indígena ("indigene" or "indigenous person", meaning Indigenous Americans). The term was and is still commonly used, in popular culture and the media, to refer to Brazilians of multi-ethnic backgrounds.

== Definitions ==
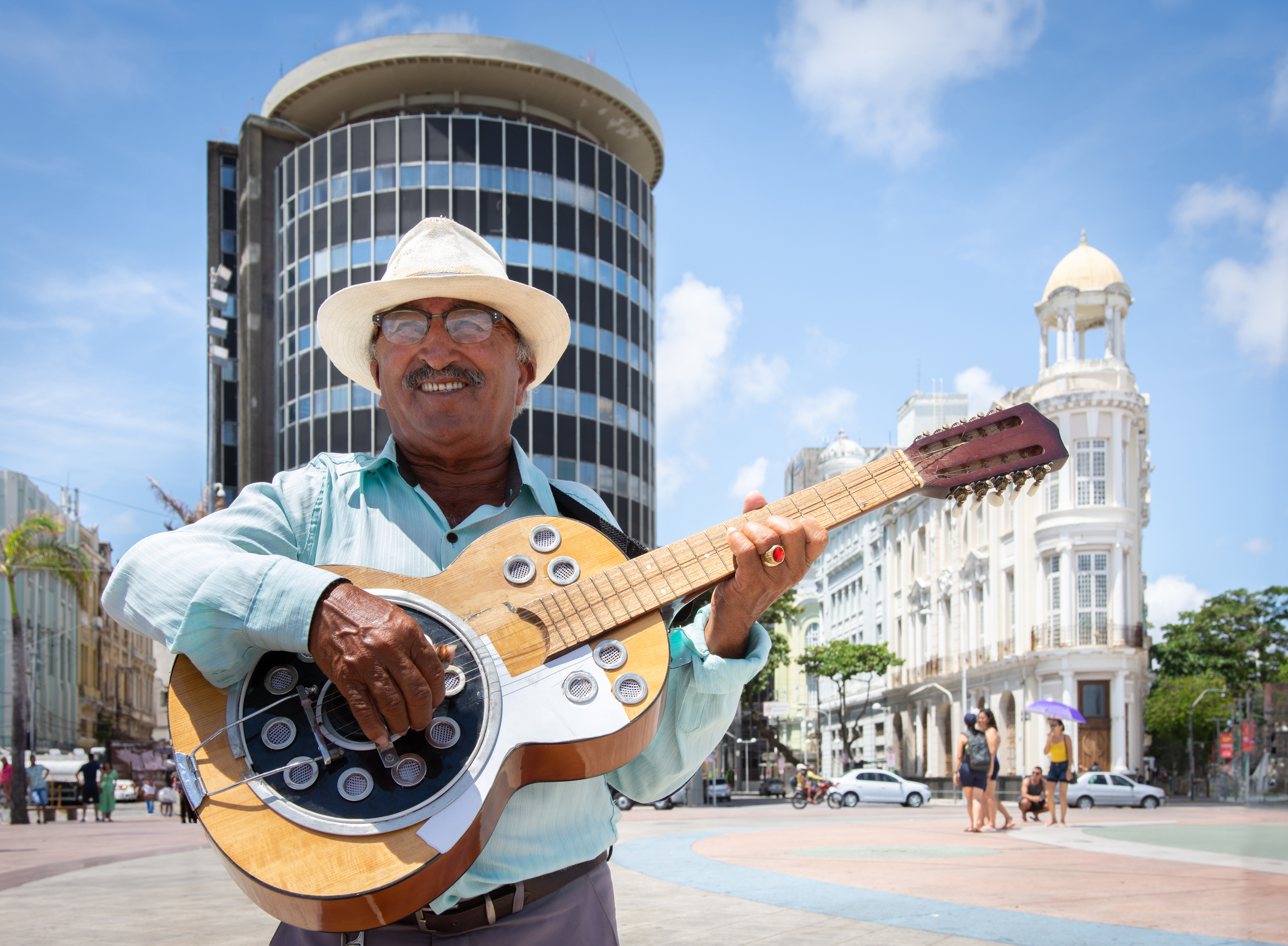
Man playing a Brazilian guitar (Violão) in Recife, Pernambuco.

According to IBGE (Brazilian Institute of Geography and Statistics), pardo is a broad classification that encompasses multiracial Brazilians such as mulatos and cafuzos, as well as assimilated Amerindians known as caboclos, mixed with Southern Europeans or not. The term "pardo" was first used in a Brazilian census in 1872. The following census, in 1890, replaced the word pardo by mestiço (that of mixed origins). The censuses of 1900 and 1920 did not ask about race, arguing that "the answers largely hide the truth".

In Brazil, the term pardo has had a general meaning since the beginning of the Portuguese colonization. In the famous letter by Pero Vaz de Caminha, for example, in which Brazil was first described by the Portuguese, the Native Americans were called "pardo": "Pardo, naked, without clothing".

A reading of colonial wills and testaments also shows it. Diogo de Vasconcelos, a widely known historian from Minas Gerais, mentions, for example, the story of Andresa de Castilhos. According to the information from the 18th century, Andresa de Castilhos was thus described: "I declare that Andresa de Castilhos, pardo woman ... has been freed ... is a descendant of the natives of the land ... I declare that Andresa de Castilhos is the daughter of a white man and a native woman".

The historian Maria Leônia Chaves de Resende also explains that the word pardo was employed to name people with native ancestry or even Native Americans themselves: a Manoel, natural son of Ana carijó, was baptized as a 'pardo'; in Campanha several Native Americans were classified as 'pardo'; the natives João Ferreira, Joana Rodriges and Andreza Pedrosa, for example, were named 'freed pardo'; a Damaso called himself 'freed pardo' of the 'native of the land'; etc.

According to Maria Leônia Chaves de Resende, the growth of the pardo population in Brazil includes the descendants of natives and not only those of African descent: "the growth of the 'pardo' segment had not only to do with the descendants of Africans, but also with the descendants of the natives, in particular the carijós and bastards, included in the condition of 'pardo'".

The American historian Muriel Nazzari specifically pointed out the "pardo" category absorbed those of Native American descent in São Paulo: "This paper seeks to demonstrate that, though many Indians and mestizos did migrate, those who remained in São Paulo came to be classified as pardos".

The question about race reappeared in the 1940 census. In this census, "pardo" was not given as an option, but if the answer was different from the options "white", "black" and "yellow", a horizontal line would be drawn into the "color" box. When the census data was tabulated, all responses with horizontal lines were collected into the single category of "pardo". The term "pardo" was not used as an option as an assurance to the public that census data would not be used for discriminatory purposes due to rising South European racist sentiment at the time. In the 1950 census, "pardo" was actually added as a choice of answer. This trend remains, with the exception of the 1970 census, which also did not ask about race.

The 20th century saw a large growth of the pardo population. In 1940, 21.2% of Brazilians were classified as pardos. In 2000, they had increased to 38.5% of the population. This came only partially due to the continuous process of miscegenation. In the 20th century, a growing number of Brazilians who used to self-report as Black in earlier censuses chose to move to the Pardo category. Also a significant part of the population that used to self-report as white also moved to the Pardo category. This indicates not so much a changing of demographics but an evolution of perceptions and ideologies prevalent at each historical moment, and a growing racial and social awareness. Magnoli describes this phenomenon as the pardização ("pardoization") of Brazil.

== Ancestry ==
According to an autosomal DNA study (the autosomal study is about the sum of the ancestors of a person, unlike mtDNA or yDNA haplogroup studies, which cover only one single line), the "pardos" in Rio de Janeiro were found to be predominantly European, at roughly 70% (see table). The geneticist Sérgio Pena criticized foreign scholar Edward Telles for lumping "blacks" and "pardos" in the same category, given the predominantly European ancestry of the "pardos" throughout Brazil. According to him, "the autosomal genetic analysis that we have performed in non-related individuals from Rio de Janeiro shows that it does not make any sense to put "blacks" and "pardos" in the same category".

Genomic ancestry of non-related individuals in Rio de Janeiro
Color	Number of individuals	Amerindian	African	European
White	107	6.7%	6.9%	86.4%
Pardo	119	8.3%	23.6%	68.1%
Black	109	7.3%	50.9%	41.8%

Another autosomal DNA study has confirmed that the European ancestry is dominant throughout in the Brazilian population, regardless of complexion, "pardos" included. "A new portrayal of each ethnic contribution to the DNA of Brazilians, obtained with samples from the five regions of the country, has indicated that, on average, European ancestors are responsible for nearly 80% of the genetic heritage of the population. The variation between the regions is small, with the possible exception of the South, where the European contribution reaches nearly 90%. The results, published by the scientific magazine 'American Journal of Human Biology' by a team from the Catholic University of Brasília, show that, in Brazil, physical indicators such as skin, eye, and hair color have little to do with the genetic ancestry of each person, as has been shown in previous studies". "Ancestry informative SNPs can be useful to estimate individual and population biogeographical ancestry. The Brazilian population is characterized by a genetic background of three parental populations (European, African, and Brazilian Native Amerindians) with a wide degree and diverse patterns of admixture. In this work we analyzed the information content of 28 ancestry-informative SNPs into multiplexed panels using three parental population sources (African, Amerindian, and European) to infer the genetic admixture in an urban sample of the five Brazilian geopolitical regions. The SNPs assigned apart the parental populations from each other and thus can be applied for ancestry estimation in a three hybrid admixed population. Data was used to infer genetic ancestry in Brazilians with an admixture model. Pairwise estimates of F(st) among the five Brazilian geopolitical regions suggested little genetic differentiation only between the South and the remaining regions. Estimates of ancestry results are consistent with the heterogeneous genetic profile of Brazilian population, with a major contribution of European ancestry (0.771) followed by African (0.143) and Amerindian contributions (0.085). The described multiplexed SNP panels can be useful tool for bio-anthropological studies but it can be mainly valuable to control for spurious results in genetic association studies in admixed populations." The same source also states, "the samples came from free of charge paternity test takers, thus as the researchers made it explicit: "the paternity tests were free of charge, the population samples involved people of variable socioeconomic strata, although likely to be leaning slightly towards the pardo group".

According to another autosomal DNA study conducted on a school in the poor periphery of Rio de Janeiro the "pardos" there were found to be on average over 80% European, and the "whites" (who thought of themselves as "very mixed") were found out to carry very little Amerindian and/or African admixtures. "The results of the tests of genomic ancestry are quite different from the self-made estimates of European ancestry", say the researchers. In general, the test results showed that European ancestry is far more important than the students thought it would be. The "pardos" for example thought of themselves as 1/3 European, 1/3 African and 1/3 Amerindian before the tests, and yet their ancestry was determined to be at over 80% European.

An autosomal study from 2011 (with nearly almost 1,000 samples from all over the country, "whites", "pardos" and "blacks") has also concluded that European ancestry is the predominant ancestry in Brazil, accounting for nearly 70% of the ancestry of the population. "In all regions studied, the European ancestry was predominant, with proportions ranging from 60.6% in the Northeast to 77.7% in the South". The "pardos" included were found to be predominantly European in ancestry on average. The 2011 autosomal study samples came from blood donors (the lowest classes constitute the great majority of blood donors in Brazil), and also public health institutions personnel and health students.

Genomic ancestry of individuals in Porto Alegre Sérgio Pena et al. 2011 .
Color	Amerindian	African	European
White	9.3%	5.3%	85.5%
Pardo	15.4%	42.4%	42.2%
Black	11%	45.9%	43.1%
Total	9.6%	12.7%	77.7%

Genomic ancestry of individuals in Ilhéus Sérgio Pena et al. 2011 .
Color	Amerindian	African	European
White	8.8%	24.4%	66.8%
Pardo	11.9%	28.8%	59.3%
Black	10.1%	35.9%	53.9%
Total	9.1%	30.3%	60.6%

Genomic ancestry of individuals in Belém Sérgio Pena et al. 2011 .
Color	Amerindian	African	European
White	14.1%	7.7%	78.2%
Pardo	20.9%	10.6%	68.6%
Black	20.1%	27.5%	52.4%
Total	19.4%	10.9%	69.7%

Genomic ancestry of individuals in Fortaleza Sérgio Pena et al. 2011 .
Color	Amerindian	African	European
White	10.9%	13.3%	75.8%
Pardo	12.8%	14.4%	72.8%
Black	N.S.	N.S.	N.S

== History ==
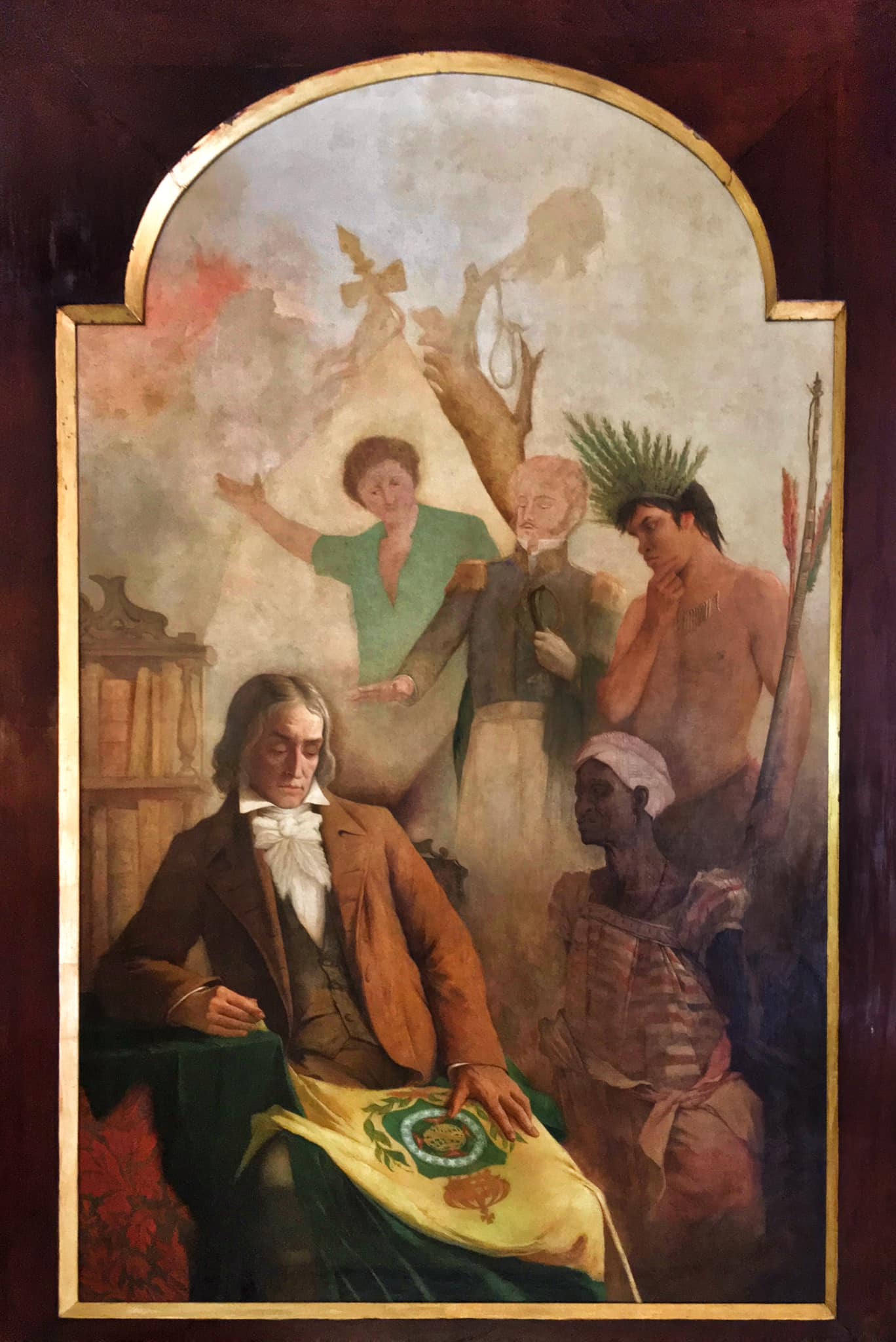
The Founding of the Brazilian Fatherland, a 1899 allegorical painting depicting statesman José Bonifácio de Andrada e Silva, one of the founding fathers of the country, with the Brazilian imperial flag and three major ethnic groups in Brazil

The formation of the Brazilian people is characterized by the mixing of whites, blacks and Indians. According to geneticist Sérgio Pena, "with the exception of immigrants of first or second generation, there is no Brazilian who does not carry a bit of African and Amerindian genetic". "The correlation between color and genomic ancestry is imperfect: at the individual level one cannot safely predict the skin color of a person from his/her level of European, African and Amerindian ancestry nor the opposite. Regardless of their skin color, the overwhelming majority of Brazilians have a high degree of European ancestry. Also, regardless of their skin color, the overwhelming majority of Brazilians have a significant degree of African ancestry. Finally, most Brazilians have a significant and very uniform degree of Amerindian ancestry.

The high ancestral variability observed in whites and blacks suggests that each Brazilian has a singular and quite individual proportion of European, African and Amerindian ancestry in his/her mosaic genomes" (geneticist Sérgio Pena). The colonization of Brazil was characterized by a small proportion of women among the initial settlers. As there was a male predominance in the European contingent present in Brazil, most sexual partners of those settlers were, initially, Amerindian or African women, and, later, mixed-race women. This sexual asymmetry is marked on the genetics of the Brazilian people, regardless of skin color: there is a predominance of European Y chromosomes, and of Amerindian and African mtDNA. Haplogroup frequencies do not determine phenotype nor admixture. They are very general genetic snapshots, primarily useful in examining past population group migratory patterns. Only autosomal DNA testing can reveal admixture structures, since it analyzes millions of alleles from both maternal and paternal sides. Contrary to yDNA or mtDNA, which are focused on one single lineage (paternal or maternal) the autosomal DNA studies profile the whole ancestry of a given individual, being more accurate in describing the complex patterns of ancestry in a given place. In the Brazilian "white" and "pardos" the autosomal ancestry (the sum of the ancestors of a given individual) tends to be largely European, with often a non-European mtDNA (which points to a non-European ancestor somewhere up the maternal line), which is explained by the women marrying newly arrived colonists, during the formation of the Brazilian people.

In the first century of colonization, there was interbreeding between Portuguese males and Amerindian females in Brazil. However, the Amerindian population was decimated by epidemics, wars and slavery. Since 1550, African slaves began to be brought to Brazil in large numbers. Miscegenation between Portuguese males and African females was common. European and Asiatic immigrants who came to Brazil in the 19th and 20th centuries (Portuguese, Italians, Spaniards, Germans, Arab, Japanese, etc.) also participated in the process. Among many of the immigrant groups in Brazil, there was a large predominance of men.

In all Brazilian regions, European, African and Amerindian genetic markers are found in the local populations, even though the proportion of each varies from region to region and from individual to individual. However, most regions showed basically the same structure, a greater European contribution to the population, followed by African and Native American contributions: "Some people had the vision Brazil was a heterogeneous mosaic. ... Our study proves Brazil is a lot more integrated than some expected". Brazilian homogeneity is, therefore, greater within regions than between them:

Region	European	African	Native American
Northern Brazil	68.80%	10.50%	18.50%
Northeast of Brazil	60.10%	29.30%	8.90%
Southeast Brazil	74.20%	17.30%	7.30%
Southern Brazil	79.50%	10.30%	9.40%

An autosomal study from 2013, with nearly 1,300 samples from all of the Brazilian regions, found a pred. degree of European ancestry combined with African and Native American contributions, in varying degrees. 'Following an increasing North to South gradient, European ancestry was the most prevalent in all urban populations (with values up to 74%). The populations in the North consisted of a significant proportion of Native American ancestry that was about two times higher than the African contribution. Conversely, in the Northeast, Center-West and Southeast, African ancestry was the second most prevalent. At an intrapopulation level, all urban populations were highly admixed, and most of the variation in ancestry proportions was observed between individuals within each population rather than among population'.

Region	European	African	Native American
North Region	51%	17%	32%
Northeast Region	56%	28%	16%
Central-West Region	58%	26%	16%
Southeast Region	61%	27%	12%
South Region	74%	15%	11%

A 2015 autosomal genetic study, which analyzed data of 25 studies of 38 different Brazilian populations concluded that European ancestry accounts for 62% of the heritage of the population, followed by the African (21%) and the Native American (17%). The European contribution is highest in Southern Brazil (77%), the African highest in Northeast Brazil (27%) and the Native American is the highest in Northern Brazil (32%).

Region	European	African	Native American
North Region	51%	16%	32%
Northeast Region	58%	27%	15%
Central-West Region	64%	24%	12%
Southeast Region	67%	23%	10%
South Region	77%	12%	11%

Not all descendants of this mixture of peoples are included in the "pardo" category. Since racial classifications in Brazil are based on phenotype, rather than ancestry, a large part of the self-reported white population has African and Amerindian ancestors, as well as a great part of the Black population has large European and Native American contributions. Besides skin color, there are social factors that influence the racial classifications in Brazil, such as social class, wealth, racial prejudice and stigma of being Black, Mulatto or Amerindian.

The following are the results for the different Brazilian censuses, since 1872:

Brazilian Population, by Race, from 1872 to 2022^{1} (Census Data)
Race or Color	Brancos ("whites")	Pardos ("mixed")	Pretos ("blacks")	Caboclos ("indigenous"/"mestizo")	Amarelos ("yellow"/"East Asian")	Indigenous	Undeclared	Total
1872^{2}	3,787,289	3,801,782	1,954,452	386,955	-	-	-	9,930,478
1890	6,302,198	4,638,496^{3}	2,097,426	1,295,795^{3}	-	-	-	14,333,915
1940	26,171,778	8,744,365^{4}	6,035,869	-	242,320	-	41,983	41,236,315
1950	32,027,661	13,786,742	5,692,657	-	329,082	-^{5}	108,255	51,944,397
1960	42,838,639	20,706,431	6,116,848	-	482,848	-^{6}	46,604	70,191,370
1980	64,540,467	46,233,531	7,046,906	-	672,251	-	517,897	119,011,052
1991	75,704,927	62,316,064	7,335,136	-	630,656	294,135	534,878	146,815,796
2000	91,298,042	65,318,092	10,554,336	-	761,583	734,127	1,206,675	169,872,856
2010	91,051,646	82,277,333	14,517,961	-	2,084,288	817,963	6,608	190,755,799
2022	88,252,121	92,083,286	20,656,458	-	850,130	1,227,642		203,080,756
Race or Color	Brancos	Pardos	Pretos	Caboclos	Amarelos	Indigenous	Undeclared	Total
1872	38.14%	38.28%	19.68%	3.90%	-	-	-	100%
1890	43.97%	32.36%	14.63%	9.04%	-	-	-	100%
1940	63.47%	21.21%	14.64%	-	0.59%	-	0.10%	100%
1950	61.66%	26.54%	10.96%	-	0.63%	-	0.21%	100%
1960	61.03%	29.50%	8.71%	-	0.69%	-	0.07%	100%
1980	54.23%	38.85%	5.92%	-	0.56%	-	0.44%	100%
1991	51.56%	42.45%	5.00%	-	0.43%	0.20%	0.36%	100%
2000	53.74%	38.45%	6.21%	-	0.45%	0.43%	0.71%	100%
2010	47.73%	43.13%	7.61%	-	1.09%	0.43%	0.00%	100%
2022	43.46%	45.34%	10.17%	-	0.42%	0.60%		100%

^1The 1900, 1920, and 1970 censuses did not count people for "race".

^2In the 1872 census, people were counted based on self-declaration, except for slaves, who were classified by their owners.

^3The 1872 and 1890 censuses counted "caboclos" (White-Amerindian mixed race people) apart. In the 1890 census, the category "pardo" was replaced with "mestiço". Figures for 1890 are available at the IBGE site.

^4In the 1940 census, people were asked for their "color or race"; if the answer was not "White", "Black", or "Yellow", interviewers were instructed to fill the "color or race" box with a slash. These slashes were later totaled in the category "pardo". In practice this means answers such as "pardo", "moreno", "mulato", "caboclo", etc.

^5In the 1950 census, the category "pardo" was included on its own. Amerindians were counted as "pardos".

^6The 1960 census adopted a similar system, again explicitly including Amerindians as "pardos".

== Important or famous Pardo Brazilians ==
=== Politics ===
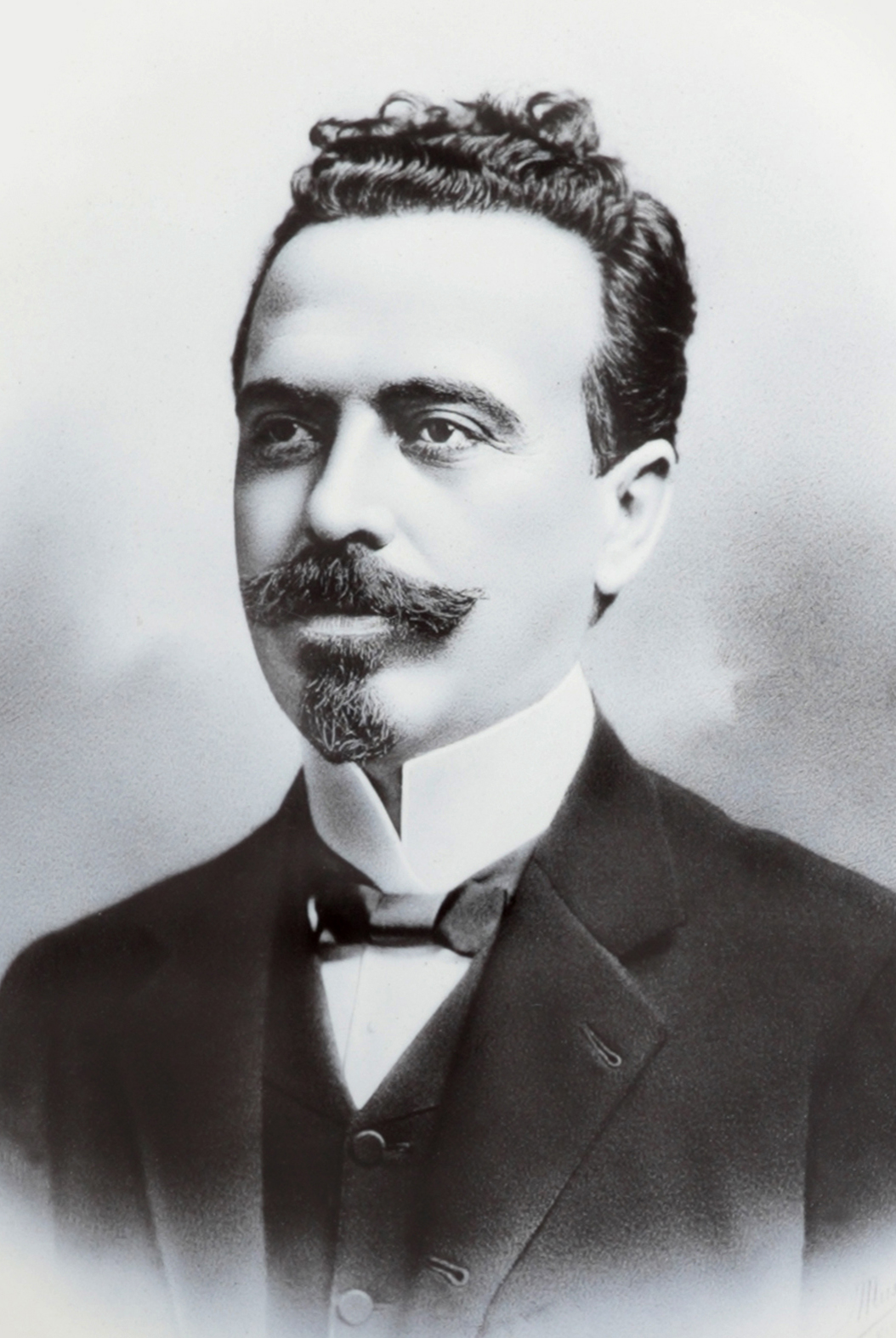
Nilo Peçanha is considered Brazil's first pardo president, assuming the presidency in 1909.

According to africanologist Alberto da Costa e Silva, many mixed-race politicians were perceived as white due to being part of the elite, including presidents Nilo Peçanha, Rodrigues Alves, and Washington Luís. Another president, Fernando Henrique Cardoso, also had some African ancestry and described himself as "slightly mulatto". He allegedly once said that he had "a foot in the kitchen" (a nod to 19th century Brazilian domestic slavery).

Since the end of the military dictatorship, the political participation of pardos has increased. Minister Marina Silva is a descendant of Portuguese and black African ancestors in both her maternal and paternal lines.

=== Arts, entertainment and sports ===
Many important names of Brazilian literature are or have been pardos. Machado de Assis, generally considered the most important Brazilian writer of fiction, was himself "pardo". Other remarkable writer includes Lima Barreto (a novelist, master of satire and sarcasm, and pioneer of social criticism).

Other remarkable artists include Father José Maurício Nunes Garcia (a baroque conductor and composer), and Aleijadinho (an outstanding sculptor and architect) attained high prestige as artists.

Examples of pardos in popular music include Chiquinha Gonzaga and Lupicínio Rodrigues.

Pardos in football include Ronaldo, popularly dubbed "the phenomenon", is considered by experts and fans to be one of the greatest football players of all time.

== Moreno ==
In daily usage, Brazilians use the ambiguous term moreno, a word that means "dark-skinned", "dark-haired", "tawny", "swarthy", "Brown" (when referring to people), "suntanned". Moreno is often used as an intermediate color category, similar to pardo, but its meaning is significantly broader, including people who self-identify as black, white, yellow or Amerindian in the IBGE classification system. In a 1995 survey, 32% of the population self-identified as "moreno", with a further 6% self-identifying as "moreno claro" ("light brown"), and 7% self-identified as "pardo". Telles describes both classifications as "biologically invalid", but sociologically significant.

== Demographics ==
Pardo Brazilians 1872-2022
Year	Population	% of Brazil
1872	3,801,782	38.28%
1890	4,638,496	▼32.36%
1940	8,744,365	▼21.21%
1950	13,786,742	▲26.54%
1960	20,706,431	▲29.50%
1980	46,233,531	▲38.85%
1991	62,316,064	▲42.45%
2000	65,318,092	▼38.45%
2010	82,277,333	▲43.13%
2022	92,083,286	▲45.34%
Source: Brazilian census

=== By region ===
The Brazilian regions by percent of pardo people.

2022 data:

- 1) North – 67.2% of pardos
- 2) Northeast – 59.6%
- 3) Central-West – 52.4%
- 4) Southeast – 38.7%
- 5) South – 21.7%

=== By state ===
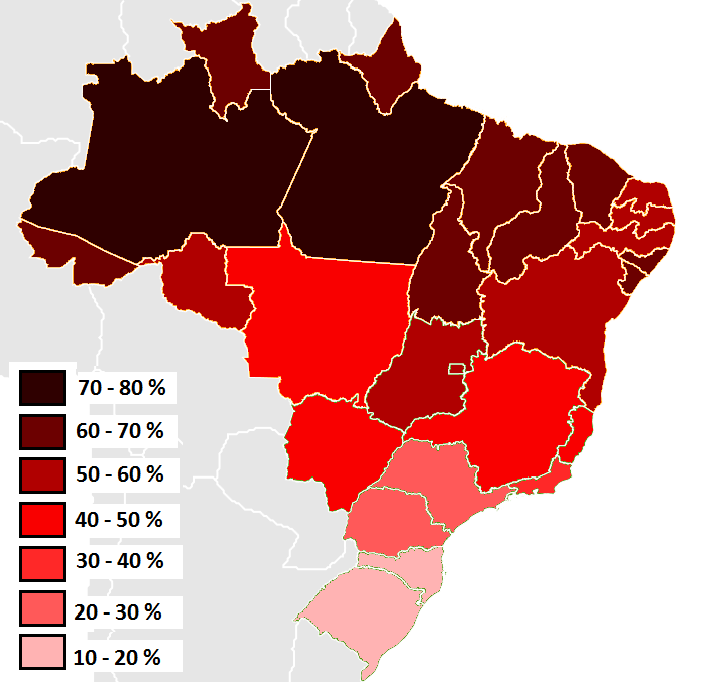
Brazilian States according to percentage of Pardos in 2009.

According to IBGE's data for 2022, of the ten states with greatest percentual pardo population, five were in the North and five in the Northeast.

- 1) Pará – 69.9%
- 2) Amazonas – 68.8%
- 3) Maranhão – 66.4%
- 4) Acre – 66.3%
- 5) Amapá – 65.3%
- 6) Piauí – 64.8%
- 7) Ceará – 64.7%
- 8) Tocantins – 62.1%
- 9) Sergipe – 61.6%
- 10) Alagoas – 60.4%

Between 2000 and 2010, the states of Goiás, Minas Gerais and Espírito Santo, together with the Federal District moved to the group of majority nonwhite states, of which pardos are very likely to be the new majority if trends continue as they perform the greatest nonwhite group in all Brazilian states. The next to be minority-majority is probably Mato Grosso do Sul (51.78% white), followed by Rio de Janeiro (54.25% white). The four southernmost states were all >70% white in the 20th century, nevertheless in the last 2010 census São Paulo turned to be almost exactly 70.0% white, and according to the contemporary demographic trends it is likely to be less than 70% now.

It should be pointed out that self-identification and ancestry do not correlate well in Brazil. A predominantly self-identified "pardo" state like Goiás turned out to be mostly European in ancestry according to an autosomal study from the UnB undertaken in 2008. According to that study, the ancestral composition of Goiás is 83,70% European, 13,30% African and 3,0% Native American.

In Fortaleza, for example, both "whites" and "pardos" displayed a similar ancestral composition, according to a 2011 autosomal study: a predominant degree of European ancestry (>70%) was found out, with minor but important African and Native American contributions.

=== By municipality ===
IBGE's data for 2000. Of the ten municipalities with the greatest percentual pardo population, eight were in the Northeast and two in the North.

- 1) Nossa Senhora das Dores (Sergipe) – 98.16% of pardos
- 2) Santo Inácio do Piauí (Piauí) – 96.90%
- 3) Boa Vista do Ramos (Amazonas) – 92.40%
- 4) Belágua (Maranhão) – 90.85%
- 5) Itacuruba (Pernambuco) – 90.05%
- 6) Monte Alegre de Sergipe (Sergipe) – 90.03%
- 7) Pracuuba (Amapá) – 89.99%
- 8) Ipubi (Pernambuco) – 89.93%
- 9) Floresta do Piauí (Piauí) – 89.37%
- 10) Pinhão (Sergipe) – 87.51%

== See also ==
- Amazonian Jews
- Brown (racial classification)
- Caboclos
- Cafuzos
- Caiçaras
- Coloureds
- Mamelucos
- Mestiços
- Kalungas
- Pardo
