= Magnoli =

Magnoli is a surname. Notable people with the surname include:

- Albert Magnoli (born c. 1954), American film director, screenwriter, and editor
- Demétrio Magnoli (born 1958), Brazilian sociologist, writer, and journalist
