= 1872 Brazilian census =

1872 census of the population of Brazil

First census of Brazil
- 1 August 1872
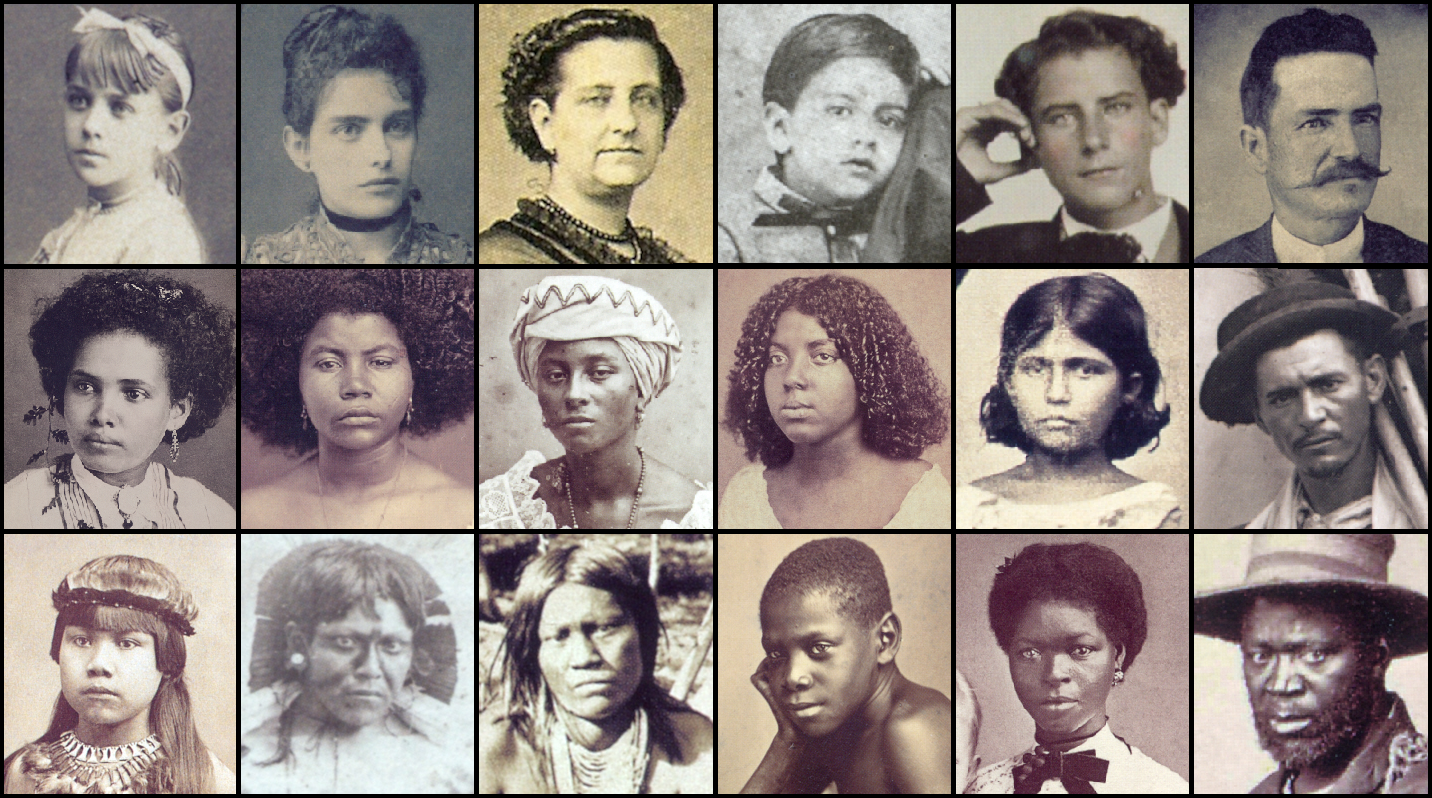
- 19th century Brazilians

General information
- Country: Empire of Brazil

Results
- Total population: 9,930,478
- Most populous province: Minas Gerais (2,039,735)
- Least populous province: Amazonas (57,610)

The 1872 Brazilian census was the first census carried out in Brazilian territory, during the imperial period. All residents in private and collective households (called "fogos") who were in it on the reference date of the census, which was 1 August 1872, were censused. The population was distributed according to color, sex, free or slave status, marital status, nationality, occupation and religion.

== General Directorate of Statistics ==
During the imperial period, the Brazilian government felt the need to obtain statistical data to better understand the country. Because of this, in 1871, by Decree No. 4,676, in compliance with Law No. 1,829, the General Directorate of Statistics (Diretoria Geral de Estatística, DGE) was created to organize national statistical activities and carry out, in the following year, the first census made in Brazil. With the establishment of the Republic, the new government reorganized the DGE and expanded its activities, implementing the civil registry of births, marriages and deaths. From 1890 onwards, carried out by the then General Directorate of Statistics, censuses took place every ten years, with the exception of 1910 and 1930, in which the political situation in Brazil prevented them from being carried out. The DGE was dissolved in 1931, and only in 1936 would an equivalent body be created, the Brazilian Institute of Geography and Statistics (IBGE).

== Population profile ==
The largest race in various parts of Brazil in 1872. Blue = Whites, Green = Brown/Multiracial, Red = Blacks, Brown = Mixed White and Native American.

The percentage of slaves out of the total population by Brazilian municipality in 1872.

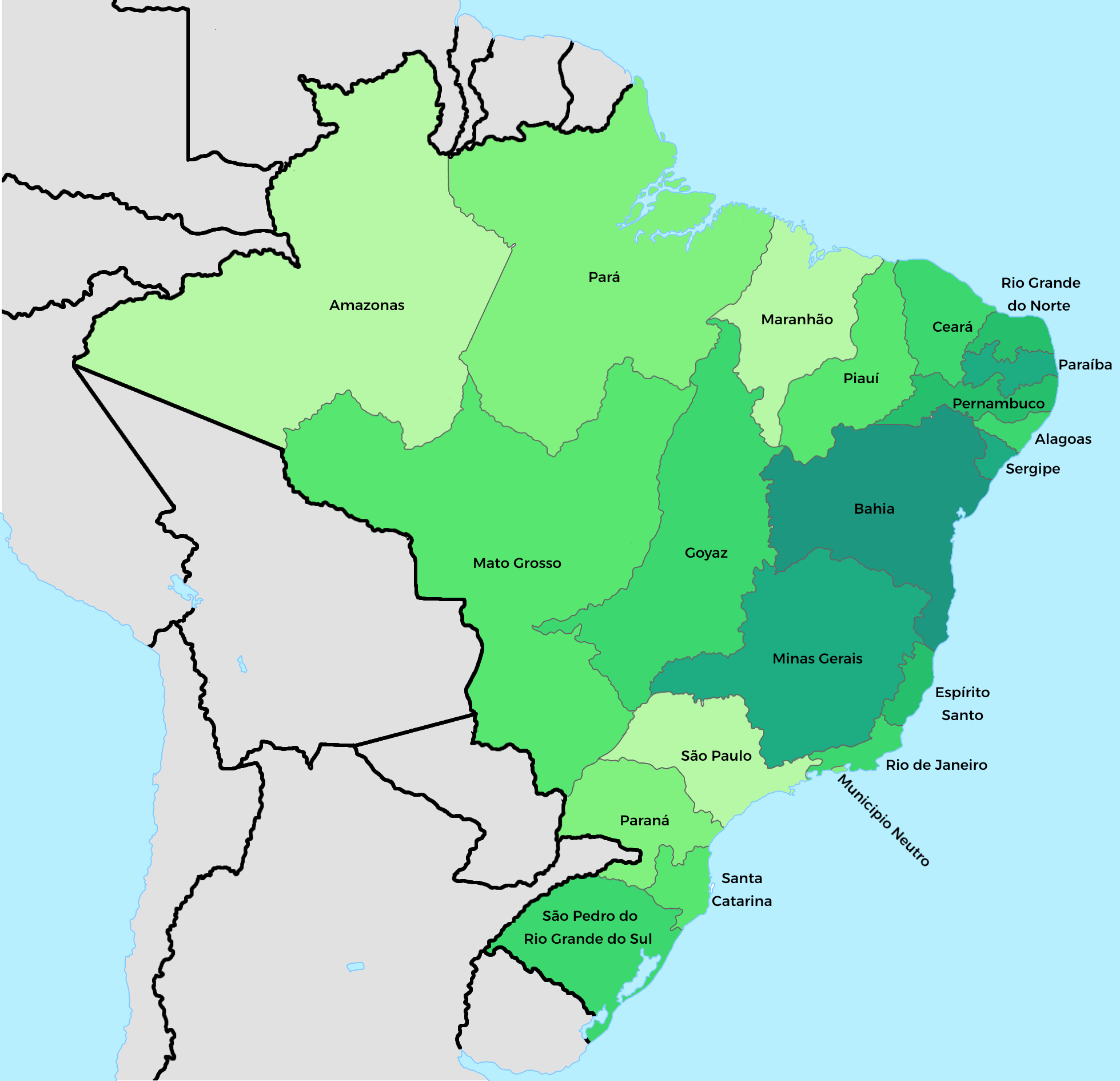
The Neutral Municipality and the provinces of the Empire of Brazil in 1872

The final results revealed that Brazil had 9,930,478 inhabitants, 5,123,869 men and 4,806,609 women. Men represented 51.6% and women 48.4% of the total population. Regarding the number of inhabitants, the results did not include 181,583 inhabitants, estimated for 32 parishes, in which the census was not carried out on the given date.

According to the census, 38.3% were pardo, 38.1% white and 19.7% black. The indigenous population, named in the census as "caboclos", made up 3.9% of the total. After the 1872 census indigenous people remained for 101 years without appearing as a separate category in the population surveys, only returning in 1991. In the case of the indigenous, some due to the tone of skin, may have been classified as pardo, in addition, the vast majority of native peoples did not answer the census; several villages were not counted because it was difficult to reach them. Countless indigenous peoples lived in isolated tribes, preserving their primitive lifestyle.

In 1872 slaves represented 15.2% of the Brazilian population, of which 31% were counted as pardos. Some municipalities had more slaves than free people, as in Santa Maria Madalena, São João da Barra, Valença, Piraí and Vassouras, in Rio de Janeiro; Bananal, in São Paulo; Santa Cruz, in Bahia; and São Luiz Gonzaga, in Maranhão.

Foreigners made up 3.8% of Brazil's population. Of the total number of immigrants, 36% were slaves. “Africans”, slaves, free or freed, were the majority of foreigners (46%); followed by Portuguese (33%), Germans (10.5%), Italians (2.1%) and French (1.8%). Despite being included in the census simply as "Africans", most of them came from different ethnic groups from at least eight major regions of the African continent, such as Senegambia, the Gulf of Benin, West Central Africa and the Gulf of Biafra, and others.

Among the free population, 23.4% of men and 13.4% of women were considered literate. Of the population aged between 6 and 15, 17% of men and 11% of women attended schools. Population data by age group showed that 24.6% of the population were children under 10 years of age; 21.1% were adolescents and young people between 11 and 20 years old; 32.9% were adults between 21 and 40 years old; 8.4% were between 41 and 50 years old; 12.8% were between 51 and 70 years old; and, finally, only 3.4% were over 71 years of age.

99.7% of the population was classified as Catholic (9.900.888 people) and 0.29% (29.590) as non-Catholic. 80% of the "non-Catholics" were German immigrants. However, there were, at that time, about 383 thousand amerindians, who followed their own religious conceptions. Furthermore, all slaves were classified as Catholics, but many of them maintained the original African religions that, after the abolition of slavery, would give rise to Afro-Brazilian religions.

The census presents, in addition to the population count, specific information about people with disabilities, access to school and professions exercised, among others. At the time, farming was the profession with the most people, followed by domestic services. Of the liberal professions, artists were the most numerous, even among the slave population. Among women, the predominant professions were domestic service, farmers and seamstresses. From the total population (men and women), about 42% had no profession (55% among free people, 24% among slaves). The DGE itself recognizes that the contingent without a specific profession was “huge”, especially in the provinces of Rio Grande do Norte, Minas Gerais and Pernambuco.

The Census recorded almost 10 million inhabitants distributed in 20 provinces and the Neutral Municipality. Brazil was divided into 641 municipalities, which, in turn, were subdivided into 1,473 parishes, the smallest information units. The collection was carried out in the parishes.

In this Census, the current Northeast region still appeared as the largest in the country. Of the eight most populous provinces in Brazil, half were in the northeast, they were also among the most densely populated, since Pernambuco had a smaller area than São Paulo but with a larger population; and Paraíba, with almost the same population as Rio Grande do Sul, had a much smaller area as well. Residents of the present-day northeast and southeast regions combined made up 87.2% of the country's population.

In Imperial Brazil, contemporaries understood the country as being geographically divided into only two major regions: the north (the provinces located from Amazonas to Bahia) and the south (from Espírito Santo to Rio Grande do Sul). Thus, the northern population, that is, those who lived from Bahia to Amazonas, was 4,971,407 (50.06%) and those who lived in the other provinces, that is, the south, were 4,683,469 (47.16%); therefore, the population of the two regions was roughly equivalent, with a slight advantage to the north.

The Neutral Municipality, located between the southern provinces, had 274,972 inhabitants, about 2.77% of the country's population. Minas Gerais, with 2,039,735 inhabitants, was the most populous province and with the largest number of parishes (370), the better distribution of population in parishes (including urban and rural areas) in Minas Gerais was a remnant of the population emigration that resulted from the gold cycle, which had its heyday in the previous century and led to the move of Brazil's capital from Salvador to Rio de Janeiro in 1763 (the two largest cities in the 1872 census).

In 1872, the weight of the rural population was enormous when compared to the urban population. The population of provincial capitals and the Neutral Municipality represented 10.41% of the total population, that is, 1,083,039 people. To complete the picture, 48% of the urban population was concentrated in the cities of Rio de Janeiro, Salvador and Recife.

== Results ==
=== Population by province ===
Province	Municipalities	Non included parishes	Total parishes	Free population	% Free	Slave population	% Slaves	Total population in 1872
Amazonas	7	-	22	56,631	98.30	979	1.70	57,610
Pará	32	-	70	247,779	90.02	27,458	9.98	275,237
Maranhão	37	1	53	284,101	78.95	74,939	21.05	359,040
Piauí	22	2	27	178,427	88.23	23,795	11.77	202,222
Ceará	46	-	57	689,773	95.58	31,913	4.42	721,686
Rio Grande do Norte	22	-	27	220,959	94.44	13,020	5.56	233,979
Paraíba	24	-	38	354,700	94.28	21,526	5.72	376,226
Pernambuco	39	-	71	752,511	89.42	89,028	10.58	841,539
Alagoas	19	-	28	312,268	89.73	35,741	10.27	348,009
Sergipe	24	5	30	153,620	87.16	22,623	12.84	176,243
Bahia	72	-	169	1,211,792	87.84	167,824	12.16	1,379,616
Espírito Santo	13	-	25	59,478	72.41	22,659	27.59	82,137
Rio de Janeiro	33	6	123	490,087	62.61	292,637	37.39	782,724
São Paulo	89	-	142	680,742	81.29	156,612	18.71	837,354
Paraná	16	-	23	116,162	91.67	10,560	8.33	126,722
Santa Catarina	11	-	38	144,818	90.62	14,984	9.38	159,802
Rio Grande do Sul	28	4	72	367,022	84.41	67,791	15.59	434,183
Minas Gerais	72	14	370	1,669,276	81.84	370,459	18.16	2,039,735
Goiás	26	-	54	149,743	93.36	10,652	6.64	160,395
Mato Grosso	9	-	15	53,750	88.97	6,667	11.03	60,417
Neutral Municipality	-	-	19	226,033	82.20	48,939	17.80	274,972
Empire of Brazil	641	32	1,473	8,419,672	84.78	1,510,806	15.22	9,930,478

=== Population of the provincial capitals ===
Province	Capital	Population	Proportion in relation to the province	Position in the country
Amazonas	Manaus	29,334	50.9%	74th
Pará	Belém	61,997	22.5%	7th
Maranhão	São Luís	31,604	8.8%	62nd
Piauí	Teresina	21,692	10.7%	137th
Ceará	Fortaleza	42,458	5.9%	26th
Rio Grande do Norte	Natal	20,392	8.7%	160th
Paraíba	Paraíba	24,714	6.6%	105th
Pernambuco	Recife	116,671	13.9%	3rd
Alagoas	Maceió	27,703	8%	83rd
Sergipe	Aracaju	9,559	5.4%	366th
Bahia	Salvador	129,109	9.4%	2nd
Espírito Santo	Vitória	16,157	19.7%	211th
Rio de Janeiro	Niterói	47,548	6.1%	20th
São Paulo	São Paulo	31,385	3.8%	64th
Paraná	Curitiba	12.651	10%	280th
Santa Catarina	Desterro	25,709	16.1%	96th
Rio Grande do Sul	Porto Alegre	43,998	10.1%	23rd
Minas Gerais	Ouro Preto	48,214	2.4%	19th
Goiás	Goiás	19,159	11.9%	174th
Mato Grosso	Cuiabá	35,987	59.6%	48th

=== Most populous municipalities in 1872 ===
Largest cities or towns in the Empire of Brazil (1872 census)
Rank		Province	Pop.	Rank		Province	Pop.
1	Rio de Janeiro	Neutral Municipality	274,972	11	Queluz	Minas Gerais	56,902
2	Salvador	Bahia	129,109	12	Sabará	Minas Gerais	55,449
3	Recife	Pernambuco	116,671	13	Minas Novas	Minas Gerais	54,447
4	Campos	Rio de Janeiro	88,832	14	Caruaru	Pernambuco	54,278
5	Cachoeira	Bahia	88,181	15	Grão Mogol	Minas Gerais	53,005
6	Serro	Minas Gerais	67,436	16	Feira de Santana	Bahia	51,696
7	Belém	Grão-Pará	61,997	17	Rio Pardo	Minas Gerais	51,583
8	Minas do Rio das Contas	Bahia	59,893	18	Santa Bárbara	Minas Gerais	48,344
9	Santo Amaro	Bahia	58,252	19	Ouro Preto	Minas Gerais	48,214
10	Ponte Nova	Minas Gerais	57,231	20	Niterói	Rio de Janeiro	47,548

== See also ==
- Demographics of Brazil
