= Preto =

Preto means 'black' in Portuguese and Papiamento. It may refer to:

== Places ==
- Preto River (disambiguation)
- Rio Preto (disambiguation)
- Ouro Preto, a city in the state of Minas Gerais, Brazil
- Pinheiro Preto, a municipality in the state of Santa Catarina, Brazil
- Ribeirão Preto, a municipality in the state of São Paulo, Brazil

== People ==
- Francisco Rolão Preto (1893–1977), Portuguese politician, journalist, and leader of the Movimento Nacional-Sindicalista
- José Ramos Preto (1871–1949), Portuguese jurist and politician
- Preto (footballer, born 1978), Brazilian football defender born Marcos Antônio Costa
- Preto (footballer, born 1981), Brazilian football forward born João Luiz Ferreira da Silva
- Preto (footballer, born January 1986), Brazilian football goalkeeper born Celismar dos Santos Marins
- Preto (footballer, born July 1986), Brazilian football forward born Jonathan Antenor de Moura Almeida

== See also ==
- Alfrocheiro Preto, a red Portuguese wine grape variety
- Pau Preto, a vernacular name for the tree Dalbergia retusa
- Afro-Brazilians, preto ('black') in Portuguese
- Sternarchogiton preto, a weakly electric knifefish species
