= Mameluco =

First generation child of a European and an Amerindian

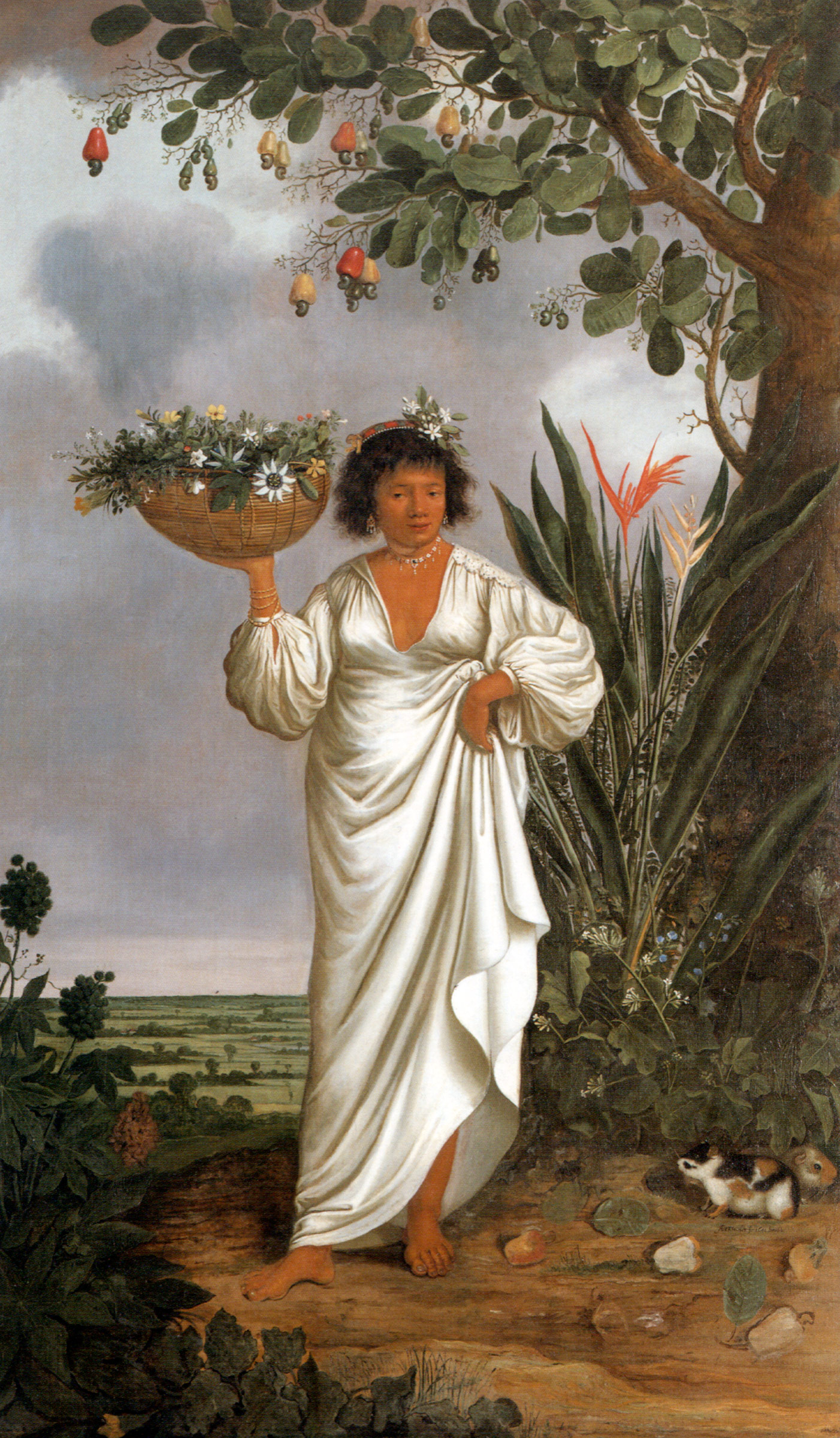
Albert Eckhout: a mameluco woman in Brazil, c. 1641–1644

Mameluco is a Portuguese word that denotes the first generation child of a European and an Amerindian. It corresponds to the Spanish word mestizo.

In the 17th and 18th centuries, mameluco was also used to refer to organized bands of explorers from Colonial Brazil known as bandeirantes, who roamed the interior of South America departing from São Paulo near the Atlantic Ocean to the interior of Brazil and Paraguay, invading Guarani settlements in search of slaves and gold.

The word may have become common in Portugal in the Middle Ages, deriving from the Arabic, "Mamluk", "slave", commonly referring to soldiers and rulers of slave origin, especially in Egypt.

== See also ==
- Amazonian Jews
- Caboclo
- Mestiço
- Mixed-race Brazilian
- Pardo Brazilians
