= Mixed-race Brazilians =

Brazilians of mixed racial origins

Brazilian censuses do not use a "multiracial" category. Instead, the censuses use skin colour categories. Most Brazilians of visibly mixed racial origins self-identify as pardos. According to the 2022 census, "pardos" make up 92.1 million people or 45.3% of Brazil's population.

According to some DNA researches, Brazilians predominantly possess a great degree of mixed-race ancestry, though less than half of the country's population classified themselves as "pardos" in the census. This is not seen as any kind of misclassification, since the census categories are not and do not intend to be, based on ancestry, but rather on skin colour.

== History ==
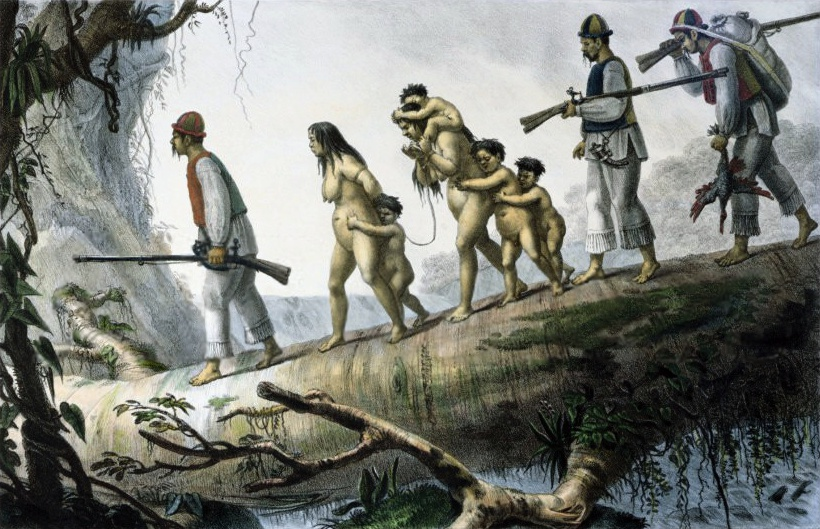
Debret: a Guarani family captured by slave hunters in Brazil.

Before the arrival of the Portuguese in 1500, Brazil was inhabited by nearly five million Amerindians. The Portuguese colonization of Brazil started in the sixteenth century. In the first two centuries of colonization, 100,000 Portuguese arrived in Brazil (around 500 colonists per year). In the eighteenth century, 600,000 Portuguese arrived (6,000 per year). Another race, Blacks, were brought from Africa as slaves, starting around 1550. Many came from Guinea or from West African countries - by the end of the eighteenth century many had been taken from Congo, Angola and Mozambique (or, in Bahia, from Benin). By the time of the end of the slave trade in 1850, around 3.5 million slaves had been brought to Brazil–37% of all slave traffic between Africa and the Americas.

In the late nineteenth and early twentieth centuries, a considerable influx of mainly European immigrants arrived in Brazil. According to the Memorial do Imigrante, Brazil attracted nearly 5 million immigrants between 1870 and 1953. Most of the immigrants were from Italy or Portugal, but also significant numbers of Germans, Spaniards, Japanese and Syrian-Lebanese.

The Portuguese settlers were the ones to start the intensive race-mixing process in Brazil. Miscegenation in Brazil, according to some historians, was not a passive process as some used to believe: it was a form of domination from the Portuguese against the Native Brazilian and African populations.

The White Portuguese population in Brazil never outnumbered the non-White one. The numbers of Indigenous peoples and African slaves were much higher during Colonial Brazil. However, in the 19th century, there were more Brazilians of mixed Portuguese descent than those of pure African or Native descent.

== White/Amerindian ==
Most of the first colonists from Portugal who arrived in Brazil were singles or did not bring their wives. For that reason the first interracial marriages in Brazil occurred between Portuguese males and Amerindian females.

In Brazil, people of White/Indian ancestry are historically known as caboclos or mamelucos. They predominated in multiple regions of Brazil. One example are the Bandeirantes (Brazilian colonial scouts who took part in the Bandeiras, exploration expeditions) who operated out of São Paulo, home base for the most famous bandeirantes.

Indians, mostly free men and mamelucos, predominated in the society of São Paulo in the 16th and early 17th centuries and outnumbered Europeans. The influential families generally bore some Indian blood and provided most of the leaders of the bandeiras, with a few notable exceptions such as Antonio Raposo Tavares (1598–1658), who was European-born.

== White/Black ==
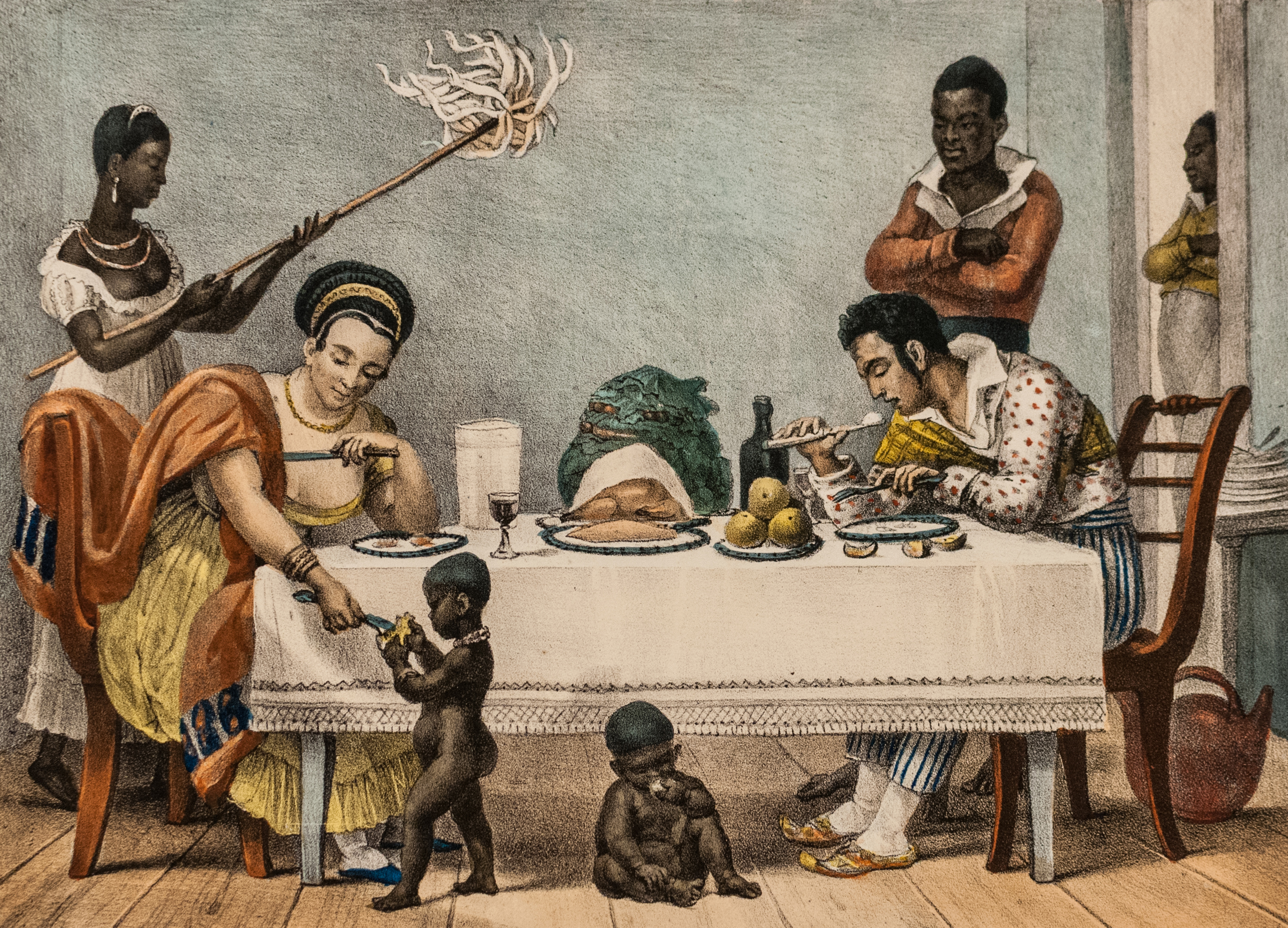
A Brazilian family of the 19th century.

According to some historians, Portuguese settlers in Brazil used to prefer to marry Portuguese-born females. If not possible, the second option were Brazilian-born females of recent Portuguese background. The third option were Brazilian-born women of distant Portuguese ancestry. However, the number of White females in Brazil was very low during the Colonial period, causing a large number of interracial relationships in the country.

White/Black relationships in Brazil started as early as the first Africans were brought as slaves in 1550 where multiple Portuguese men starting marrying black women. The Mulattoes (people of White/Black ancestry) were also enslaved, though some children of rich aristocrats and owners of gold mines were educated and became important people in Colonial Brazil. Probably, the most famous case was Chica da Silva, a mixed-race Brazilian slave who married a rich gold mine owner and became one of the richest people in Brazil.

Demographics of Brazil from 1835 to 1980
Year	White	Brown	Black
1835	24.4%	18.2%	51.4%
1872	38.1%	42.2%	19.7%
1890	44%	41.4%	14.6%
1940	63.5%	21.2%	14.7%
1950	61.7%	26.5%	11%
1960	61%	29.5%	8.7%
1980	54.8%	38.4%	5.9%

Other mulattoes largely contributed to Brazil's culture: Aleijadinho (sculptor and architect), Machado de Assis (writer), Lima Barreto (writer), Chiquinha Gonzaga (composer), etc.

In 1835, Blacks would have made up the majority of Brazil's population, according to a more recent estimate quoted by Thomas Skidmore. In 1872, their number was shown to be much smaller according to the census of that time, outnumbered by pardos and Whites.

According to a genetic study with about 200 limited samples, 86% of Brazilians would have, at least, 10% of Black African genes.

The researchers however were cautious about its conclusions: "Obviously these estimates were made by extrapolation of experimental results with relatively small samples and, therefore, their confidence limits are very ample". A new autosomal study from 2011, also led by Sérgio Pena, but with nearly 1000 samples this time, from all over the country, shows that in most Brazilian regions most Brazilians "whites" are less than 10% African in ancestry and it also shows that the "pardos" are predominantly European in ancestry, the European ancestry being therefore the main component in the Brazilian population, in spite of a very high degree of African ancestry and significant Native American contribution. Other autosomal studies (see some of them below) show a European predominance in the Brazilian population. Some researchers have found that the average European American type has approximately 10% to 12% non-White genetic material.

According to an autosomal DNA genetic study from 2011, both "whites" and "pardos" from Fortaleza have a predominantly degree of European ancestry (>70%), with minor but important African and Native American contributions. "Whites" and "pardos" from Belém and Ilhéus also were found to be predominantly European in ancestry, with minor Native American and African contributions.

Genomic ancestry of individuals in Porto Alegre Sérgio Pena et al. 2011.
Colour	Amerindian	African	European	
White	9.3%	5.3%	85.5%	
Pardo	11.4%	44.4%	44.2%	
Black	11%	45.9%	43.1%	
Total	9.6%	12.7%	77.7%	
Genomic ancestry of individuals in Fortaleza Sérgio Pena et al. 2011.
Colour	Amerindian	African	European	
White	10.9%	13.3%	75.8%	
Pardo	12.8%	14.4%	72.8%	
Black	N.S.	N.S.	N.S	
Genomic ancestry of non-related individuals in Rio de Janeiro Sérgio Pena et al. 2009
Cor	Number of individuals	Amerindian	African	European
White	107	6.7%	6.9%	86.4%
"Parda"	119	8.3%	23.6%	68.1%
"Preta"	109	7.3%	50.9%	41.8%

According to another study, autosomal DNA study (see table), those who identified as Whites in Rio de Janeiro turned out to have 86.4% - and self identified pardos 68.1% - European ancestry on average. Blacks were found out to have on average 41.8% European ancestry.

A 2015 autosomal genetic study, which also analysed data of 25 studies of 38 different Brazilian populations concluded that: European ancestry accounts for 62% of the heritage of the population, followed by the African (21%) and the Native American (17%). The European contribution is highest in Southern Brazil (77%), the African highest in Northeast Brazil (27%) and the Native American is the highest in Northern Brazil (32%).

Region	European	African	Native American
North Region	51%	16%	32%
Northeast Region	58%	27%	15%
Central-West Region	64%	24%	12%
Southeast Region	67%	23%	10%
South Region	77%	12%	11%

An autosomal study from 2013, with nearly 1300 samples from all of the Brazilian regions, found a predominant degree of European ancestry combined with African and Native American contributions, in varying degrees. 'Following an increasing North to South gradient, European ancestry was the most prevalent in all urban populations (with values up to 74%). The populations in the North consisted of a significant proportion of Native American ancestry that was about two times higher than the African contribution. Conversely, in the Northeast, Center-West and Southeast, African ancestry was the second most prevalent. At an intrapopulation level, all urban populations were highly admixed, and most of the variation in ancestry proportions was observed between individuals within each population rather than among population'.

Region	European	African	Native American
North Region	51%	17%	32%
Northeast Region	56%	28%	16%
Central-West Region	58%	26%	16%
Southeast Region	61%	27%	12%
South Region	74%	15%	11%

Another study (autosomal DNA study, from 2010) found out that: "Ancestry informative SNPs can be useful to estimate individual and population biogeographical ancestry. Brazilian population is characterized by a genetic background of three parental populations (European, African, and Brazilian Amerindians) with a wide degree and diverse patterns of admixture. In this work we analyzed the information content of 28 ancestry-informative SNPs into multiplexed panels using three parental population sources (African, Amerindian, and European) to infer the genetic admixture in an urban sample of the five Brazilian geopolitical regions. The SNPs assigned apart the parental populations from each other and thus can be applied for ancestry estimation in a three hybrid admixed population. Data was used to infer genetic ancestry in Brazilians with an admixture model. Pairwise estimates of F(st) among the five Brazilian geopolitical regions suggested little genetic differentiation only between the South and the remaining regions. Estimates of ancestry results are consistent with the heterogeneous genetic profile of Brazilian population, with a major contribution of European ancestry (0.771) followed by African (0.143) and Amerindian contributions (0.085). The described multiplexed SNP panels can be useful tool for bioanthropological studies but it can be mainly valuable to control for spurious results in genetic association studies in admixed populations." "The samples came from free of charge paternity test takers, thus as the researchers made it explicit: "the paternity tests were free of charge, the population samples involved people of variable socioeconomic strata, although likely to be leaning slightly towards the pardo group". According to it the total European, African and Native American contributions to the Brazilian population are:

Region	European	African	Native American
North Region	71,10%	18,20%	10,70%
Northeast Region	77,40%	13,60%	8,90%
Central-West Region	65,90%	18,70%	11,80%
Southeast Region	79,90%	14,10%	6,10%
South Region	87,70%	7,70%	5,20%

In support of the dominant European heritage of Brazil, according to another autosomal DNA study (from 2009) conducted on a school in the poor periphery of Rio de Janeiro the "pardos" there were found to be on average over 80% European, and the "whites" (who thought of themselves as "very mixed") were found out to carry very little Amerindian or African admixtures. "The results of the tests of genomic ancestry are quite different from the self made estimates of European ancestry", say the researchers. In general, the test results showed that European ancestry is far more important than the students thought it would be. The "pardos" for example thought of themselves as 1/3 European, 1/3 African and 1/3 Amerindian before the tests, and yet their ancestry was determined to be at over 80% European. The "blacks" (pretos) of the periphery of Rio de Janeiro, according to this study, thought of themselves as predominantly African before the study and yet they turned out predominantly European (at 52%), the African contribution at 41% and the Native American 7%.

According to another autosomal DNA study from 2009, the Brazilian population, in all regions of the country, was also found out to be predominantly European: "all the Brazilian samples (regions) lie more closely to the European group than to the African populations or to the Mestizos from Mexico". According to it the total European, African and Native American contributions to the Brazilian population are:

Region	European	African	Native American
North Region	60,6%	21,3%	18,1%
Northeast Region	66,7%	23,3%	10,0%
Central-West Region	66,3%	21,7%	12,0%
Southeast Region	60,7%	32,0%	7,3%
South Region	81,5%	9,3%	9,2%

According to another autosomal study from 2008, by the University of Brasília (UnB), European ancestry dominates in the whole of Brazil (in all regions), accounting for 65,90% of heritage of the population, followed by the African contribution (24,80%) and the Native American (9,3%).

An autosomal study from 2011 (with nearly almost 1000 samples from all over the country, "whites", "pardos" and "blacks" included) has also concluded that European ancestry is the predominant ancestry in Brazil, accounting for nearly 70% of the ancestry of the population: "In all regions studied, the European ancestry was predominant, with proportions ranging from 60.6% in the Northeast to 77.7% in the South". The 2011 autosomal study samples came from blood donors (the lowest classes constitute the great majority of blood donors in Brazil), and also public health institutions personnel and health students. In all Brazilian regions European, African and Amerindian genetic markers are found in the local populations, even though the proportion of each varies from region to region and from individual to individual. However most regions showed basically the same structure, a greater European contribution to the population, followed by African and Native American contributions: "Some people had the vision Brazil was a heterogeneous mosaic [...] Our study proves Brazil is a lot more integrated than some expected". Brazilian homogeneity is, therefore, greater within regions than between them:

Region	European	African	Native American
Northern Brazil	68,80%	10,50%	18,50%
Northeast of Brazil	60,10%	29,30%	8,90%
Southeast Brazil	74,20%	17,30%	7,30%
Southern Brazil	79,50%	10,30%	9,40%

According to an autosomal DNA study (from 2003) focused on the composition of the Brazilian population as a whole, "European contribution [...] is highest in the South (81% to 82%), and lowest in the North (68% to 71%). The African component is lowest in the South (11%), while the highest values are found in the Southeast (18%-20%). Extreme values for the Amerindian fraction were found in the South and Southeast (7%-8%) and North (17%-18%)". The researchers were cautious with the results as their samples came from paternity test takers which may have skewed the results partly.

Several other older studies have suggested that European ancestry is the main component in all Brazilian regions. A study from 1965, Methods of Analysis of a Hybrid Population (Human Biology, vol 37, number 1), led by the geneticists D. F. Roberts e R. W. Hiorns, found out the average the Northeastern Brazilian to be predominantly European in ancestry (65%), with minor but important African and Native American contributions (25% and 9%). Parra et al 2002 stated that: "Salzano (28, a study from 1997) calculated for the Northeastern population as a whole, 51% European, 36% African, and 13% Amerindian ancestries whereas in the north, Santos and Guerreiro (29, a study from 1995) obtained 47% European, 12% African, and 41% Amerindian descent, and in the southernmost state of Rio Grande do Sul, Dornelles et al. (30, a study from 1999) calculated 82% European, 7% African, and 11% Amerindian ancestries. Krieger et al. (31, a study from 1965) studied a population of Brazilian northeastern origin living in São Paulo with blood groups and electrophoretic markers and showed that whites presented 18% of African and 12% of Amerindian genetic contribution and that blacks presented 28% of European and 5% of Amerindian genetic contribution (31). Of course, all of these Amerindian admixture estimates are subject to the caveat mentioned in the previous paragraph. At any rate, compared with these previous studies, our estimates showed higher levels of bidirectional admixture between Africans and non-Africans."

== Black/Amerindian ==
People of Black African and Native Brazilian ancestry are known as Cafuzos and are historically the less numerous group. Most of them have origin in black women who escaped slavery and were welcomed by indigenous communities, where they started families with local amerindian men.

== Japanese/non-Japanese ==
Miscegenation in the Japanese-Brazilian community
Generation	Mixed-race (%)
First	0%
Second	6%
Third	42%
Fourth	61%

A more recent phenomenon in Brazil are intermarriages between Japanese Brazilians and non-Japanese. Though people of Japanese descent make up only 0.7% of the country's population, they are the largest Japanese community outside Japan, with over 1.8 million people. In the areas with large numbers of Japanese, such as São Paulo and Paraná, since the 1970s large numbers of Japanese-descendants started marrying people of other "races", especially Whites. Although interracial relationships are not always well accepted in Japan, they might be accepted and even often celebrated in some sectors of Brazilian society.

Nowadays, among the 1.8 million Brazilians of Japanese descent, 28% have some non-Japanese ancestry. The number reaches only 6% among the children of Japanese immigrants, but 61% among the great-grandchildren of Japanese immigrants.

== See also ==
- Amazonian Jews
- Caboclo
- Mameluco
- Mestiço
- Pardo Brazilians
