= Pardo =

Term for multiracial people

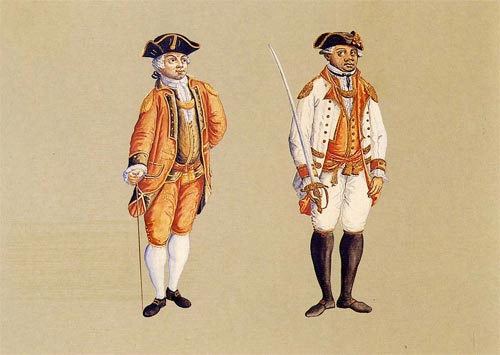
18th-century illustration of a pardo officer (right) in Colonial Brazil

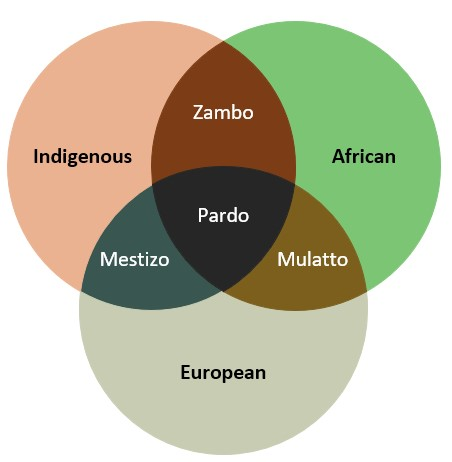
"Pardo" and related terminology in a Venn diagram

In the former Portuguese and Spanish colonies in the Americas, pardos (feminine pardas) are triracial descendants of Europeans, Indigenous Americans and Africans.

== History ==
In some places they were defined as neither exclusively mestizo (Indigenous American-European descent), nor mulatto (African-European descent), nor zambo (Indigenous American-African descent). In colonial Mexico, pardo "became virtually synonymous with mulatto, thereby losing much of its Indigenous referencing". In the eighteenth century, pardo might have been the preferred label for blackness. Unlike negro, pardo had no association with slavery. Casta paintings from eighteenth-century Mexico use the label negro, never pardo, to identify Africans paired with Spaniards.

In Brazil, the word pardo has had a general meaning since the beginning of the colonisation. In the famous letter by Pero Vaz de Caminha, for example, in which Brazil was first described by the Portuguese, the Indigenous Americans were called "pardo": "Pardo, naked, without clothing". The word has ever since been used to cover: African/European mixes, Asian/European mixes, Indigenous American/European/Asian/African mixes and Indigenous Americans themselves.

For example, Diogo de Vasconcelos, a widely known historian from Minas Gerais, mentions the story of Andresa de Castilhos. According to 18th-century accounts, Andresa de Castilhos was described by the following: "I declare that Andresa de Castilhos, parda woman ... has been freed ... is a descendant of the native gentiles of the land ... I declare that Andresa de Castilhos is the daughter of a white man and a (Christian) neophyte (Indigenous) woman".

The historian Maria Leônia Chaves de Resende says that the word pardo was used to classify people with partial or full Indigenous American ancestry. A Manoel, natural son of Ana carijó, was baptised as a 'pardo'; in Campanha, several Indigenous Americans were classified as 'pardo'; the Indigenous American João Ferreira, Joana Rodriges and Andreza Pedrosa, for example, were described as 'freed pardo'; a Damaso identifies as a 'freed pardo' of the ''native of the land''; etc. According to Chaves de Resende, the growth of the pardo population in Brazil includes the descendants of Indigenous American and not only those of African descent: "the growth of the 'pardo' segment had not only to do with the descendants of Africans, but also with the descendants of the Indigenous American, in particular the carijós and bastards, included in the condition of 'pardo'".

The American historian Muriel Nazzari in 2001 noted that the "pardo" category has absorbed those persons of Indigenous American descent in the records of São Paulo: "This paper seeks to demonstrate that, though many Indians and mestizos did migrate, those who remained in São Paulo came to be classified as pardos."

== Pardos in the Caribbean and Northern South America ==
Most pardos within Caribbean and Northern South America historically inhabited the territories where the Spanish conquistadores imported slaves during colonial times, such as the Captaincies of Cuba, Santo Domingo, Puerto Rico, Venezuela, Panama, Colombia, Nicaragua and Ecuador.

Pardos were the children of formerly enslaved black people who were now freed black people in Spanish America. These pardos were able to join the military and had moved up into high political and military roles such as "generals, congressmen, and senators". Pardos also helped win the fight for Latin American independence by fighting on the patriots' side of the cause.

In Peru, pardos are referred to the mixture of Spanish and Indigenous American with a little African contribution, located exclusively along the coast, in greater proportion between the regions of Tumbes to Ica.

== Pardos in Brazil ==
In Brazil, pardo is a race/skin colour category used by the Brazilian Institute of Geography and Statistics (IBGE) in Brazilian censuses, with historic roots in the colonial period. The term "pardo" is more commonly used to refer to mixed-race Brazilians, individuals with varied racial ancestries. The other categories are: branco ("white"), preto ("black"), amarelo ("yellow", meaning East Asians) and indígena ("indigene" or "indigenous person", meaning Indigenous Americans).

The term is still popular in Brazil. According to IBGE (Brazilian Institute of Geography and Statistics), pardo is a broad classification that encompasses multiracial Brazilians such as mulatos and cafuzos, as well as assimilated Indigenous Americans known as caboclos, mixed with Europeans or not. The term pardo was first used in a Brazilian census in 1872. The following census, in 1890, replaced the word pardo by mestiço (that of mixed origins). The censuses of 1900 and 1920 did not ask about race, arguing that "the answers largely hid the truth".

== See also ==
- Afro-Latin Americans
- Cocoa Panyol
- Garifuna people
- Casta
- Melungeon
- Mulatto
- Race and ethnicity in Latin America
- Afro-Indigenous people
