= Caboclo =

Person of mixed Indigenous Brazilian and European ancestry

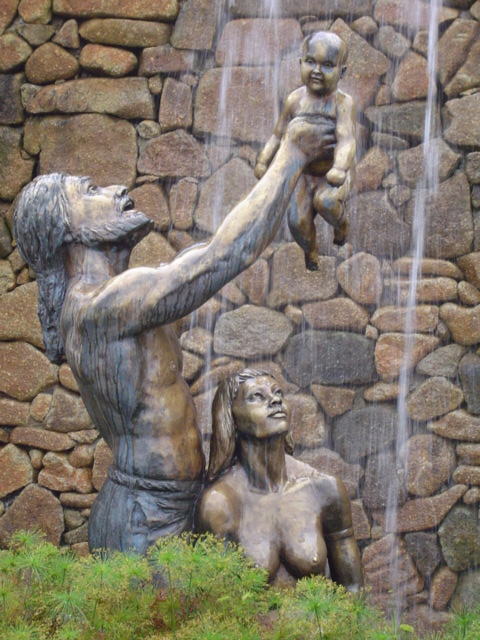
Sculpture showing the birth of a caboclo

A caboclo (Portuguese pronunciation: [kaˈboklu]) is a person of mixed Indigenous Brazilian and European ancestry, or, less commonly, a culturally assimilated or detribalized person of full Amerindian descent. In Brazil, a caboclo generally refers to this specific type of mestiço.

The term, also pronounced "caboco", is from Brazilian Portuguese, and perhaps ultimately from the Tupi kaa'boc, meaning "the one who comes from the forest". A person of mixed Indigenous Brazilian and sub-Saharan black ancestry is known as a "cafuzo."

In the 1872 and 1890 censuses, 3.9% and 9.04% of the population self-identified as caboclos, respectively. Since then, caboclos are counted as pardos, along with mulattoes (mixed Black-White) and cafuzos (mixed Amerindian-Black).

A survey performed in Rio de Janeiro showed that 14% of Whites and 6% of Pardos reported Amerindian and White ancestry.

According to some estimations, caboclos would be around 12% of Brazilian population.

== Etymology ==
The term caboclo (which in the Amazon Basin and in Candomblé is usually pronounced without the l, as caboco) is said to come from the Tupi word kari'boka, meaning "deriving from the white". Its primary meaning is mestizo, "a person of part Amerindian and part European descent." But it may also be used to refer to any Indigenous Brazilian who is assimilated. The term Indian should not be confused with people originating from India in South Asia.

The king of Portugal, Joseph I, encouraged marriages between European colonists and Indians in the 18th century; this enabled the European men to settle into families, and resulted in the birth of the first caboclo children. Similarly, in the 19th century during the time of rubber soldiers, the government kidnapped young, primarily white and mestiço Brazilian men from Northeastern Brazil and transported them into the Amazonian interior to harvest rubber. The men were never granted permission to leave, and married local native women, fathering more generations of mestiços.

The caboclo populations in the Amazon region of Brazil are noted as voracious eaters of the açaí palm fruit, which is basic to the traditional diet of the natives. In one study, açaí palm was described as the most important plant species because the fruit makes up such a major component of diet (up to 42% of the total food intake by weight) and is economically valuable in the region (Murrieta et al., 1999).

The term caboclo is also used as the term for a spirit of Indigenous origin (an ancestor or a spirit of nature) in the Afro-Brazilian religions Candomblé and Umbanda. In these religions, they are considered different from the Orishas but are nonetheless revered.

== Days celebrating racial groups in Brazil ==
- In Brazil, the "Day of the Caboclo" (Dia do Caboclo), observed annually on June 24, in celebration of the contributions and identity of the original caboclos and their descendants. This date is an official public holiday in the State of Amazonas.
- "Mixed Race Day" (Dia do Mestiço) is observed annually on June 27, three days after the Day of the Caboclo, in celebration of all mixed-race Brazilians, including the caboclos. The date is an official public holiday in three Brazilian states.
- "Indigenous Peoples Day" (Dia dos Povos Indígenas), observed annually on April 19, recognizes and honours the indigenous peoples of Brazil.

== See also ==
- Mameluco
- Race and ethnicity in Brazil
