= Demétrio Magnoli =

Brazilian sociologist and writer

Demétrio Martinelli Magnoli
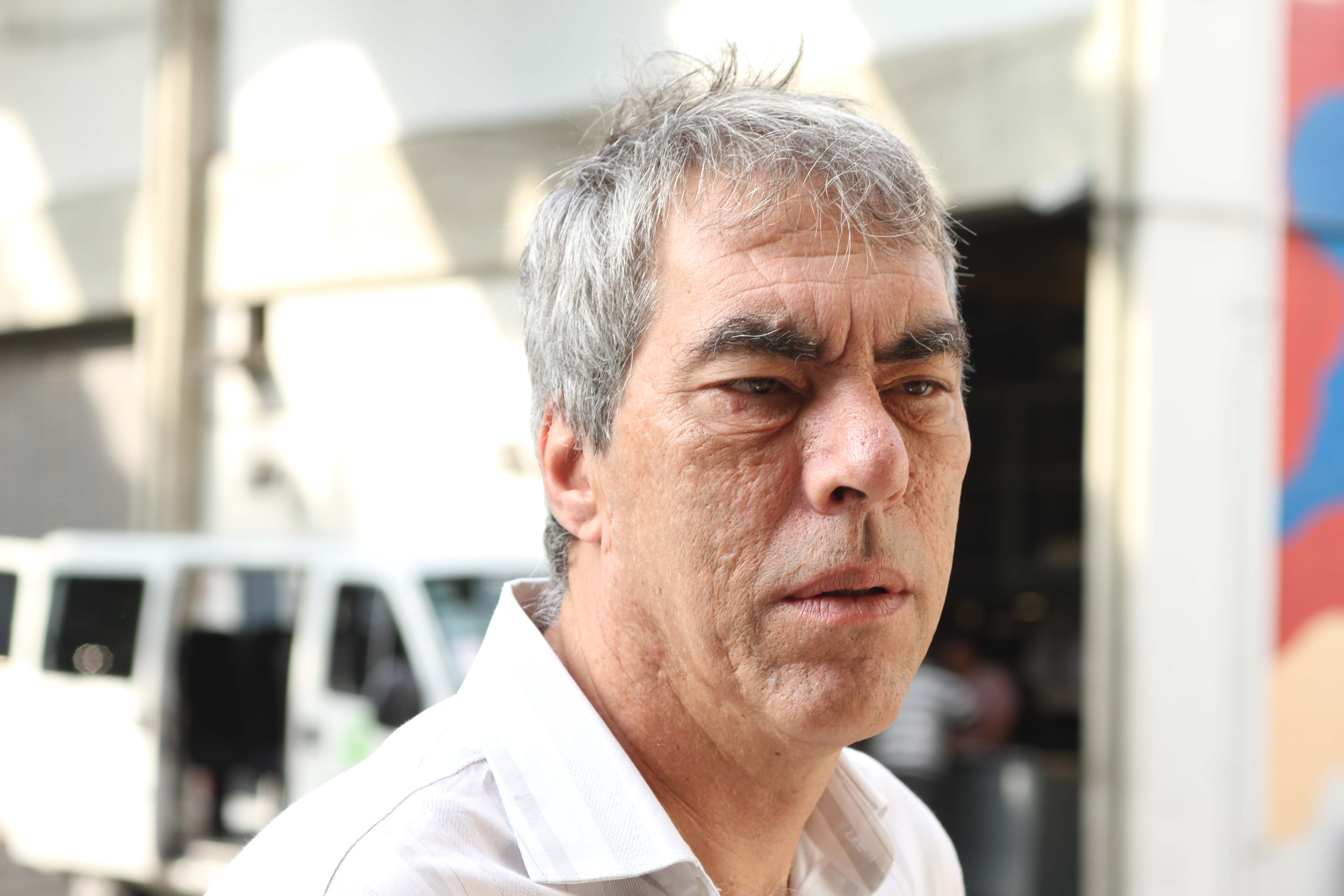
- Demétrio Martinelli Magnoli
- Born: São Paulo, São Paulo state, Brazil
- Education: University of São Paulo
- Occupation: Journalist
- Writing career
- Pen name: 13 December 1958 (age 67)
- Language: Portuguese

Demétrio Martinelli Magnoli is a Brazilian sociologist, PhD in human geography, writer and columnist. While in 2012, he was named by the Época magazine as one of the "New Right's shrill voices.", Magnoli considers himself a centre-left social-democrat.

== Academic life ==
Magnoli has a BA in social sciences and Journalism from the University of São Paulo (USP), an institution from which he also earned a doctorate in Human Geography. He was professor of Political Geography and Urban Geography at the Pontifícia Universidade Católica de São Paulo (PUC-SP).

Since 1993, he is the editorial director of the newsletter Mundo: Geografia e Política Internacional ("World: Geography and International Politics").

== Works ==
Magnoli published his first book, O que é Geopolítica? ("What is Geopolitics?"), in 1986. In 1997 he was a finalist of the Jabuti Prize, competing with the book O Corpo da Pátria: imaginação geográfica e política externa no Brasil, 1808–1912 ("The Body of the Nation: geographical imagination and foreign policy in Brazil, 1808–1912", UNESP).

He was a columnist for the newspaper Folha de S.Paulo (2004–2006), and since then has written for O Estado de S. Paulo and O Globo, besides contributing to the magazine Época and make comments about international politics for the Jornal das Dez at Globo News.

== Political positions ==
During the 1970s while in University, Magnoli took part in a Trotskyist student movement which opposed the Military Rule in Brazil. In the early 1980s Magnoli was close to the recently founded Worker's Party (PT).

In 1983 however, Magnoli abandoned Marxism, claiming it favoured authoritarianism because it made its followers believe that they had secret knowledge of the "End of History", therefore giving intellectuals the function of directing society towards that goal.

In 1989 left the PT, claiming it had abandoned its philosophical and moral principles.

Magnoli currently subscribes to European-style Social-Democracy, and believes economic freedom is not a "sacred" goal. He is nevertheless, a strong critic of many movements inside the Latin American left (Chavism, Kirchnerism, Castroism) considering the, authoritarian and state capitalist.

Magnoli was also a fierce critic of Lula's government, considering it corporatist in the tradition of Getúlio Vargas.

In the 2018 presidential elections nonetheless, Magnoli supported Worker's Party candidate Fernando Haddad, claiming Jair Bolsonaro was a threat to democracy in Brazil. He also claimed Lula had been wrongfully convicted of corruption.

== Controversies ==
Magnoli has actively positioned himself against affirmative action measures and racial quotas. In his 2009 book, Uma Gota de Sangue ("A Drop of Blood"), the central thesis is that "affirmative actions and the Black Movement result from an ideological scam" (multiculturalism), which "works against the principle of equality before the law." His point of view that in Brazil "the racial boundary doesn't exist in the minds of the people" and that by the nineteenth century the History of Brazil was told as a "mixture of races" (whereas in the United States, racial segregation became the norm), was challenged even in vehicles of which he actively participates, as Folha de S.Paulo.

Magnoli, who was an extreme-left militant when he was a university student in the 1980s (of the "Liberdade e Luta" – Libelu, a trotskyist organization), criticized in 2011 USP students who protested violently against interventions of São Paulo's military police in the campus, to suppress marijuana use. At the time, he even objected the choice of the university president by direct vote, saying it only made sense "in the 1960s and 1970s", when "there was a need to preserve the educational institution as an area of freedom of expression."

== Selected publications ==
- — (1986). O que é geopolitica. São Paulo: Brasiliense. p. 74.
- — (1992). África do Sul: capitalismo e apartheid. São Paulo: Contexto. p. 83. ISBN 978-85-7244-021-9.
- — (1993). O novo mapa do mundo. São Paulo: Moderna. p. 64. ISBN 978-85-16-00819-2.
- — (1994). União Européia: história e geopolítica. São Paulo: Moderna. p. 80. ISBN 978-8516010140.
- —; Elaine Senise Barbosa (1996). Formação do Estado Nacional: as capitais e os simbolos do poder politico. São Paulo: Scipione. p. 111. ISBN 978-8526228108.
- — (1997). O corpo da pátria: imaginação geográfica e política externa no Brasil: 1808–1912. São Paulo: UNESP / Moderna. p. 318. ISBN 978-8516017873.
- — (2004). O mundo contemporâneo: os grandes acontecimentos mundiais da guerra fria aos nossos dias. São Paulo: Atual. p. 320. ISBN 978-8535705065.
- — (2004). Relações internacionais: teoria e história. São Paulo: Saraiva. p. 370. ISBN 978-8502046146.
- —; Regina Araujo (2005). O projeto da Alca: hemisfério americano e Mercosul na ótica do Brasil. São Paulo: Moderna. p. 112. ISBN 978-8516037093.
- —; Carlos Serapião Jr. (2006). Comércio exterior e negociações internacionais. São Paulo: Saraiva. p. 377. ISBN 978-8502060098.
- — (2006). O grande jogo: política, cultura e idéias em tempos de barbárie. Rio de Janeiro: Ediouro. p. 271. ISBN 978-8500020698.
- — (2008). Terror global. São Paulo: Publifolha. p. 77. ISBN 9788574029306.
- — (2009). Uma gota de sangue: história do pensamento racial. São Paulo: Contexto. p. 398. ISBN 9788572444446.
- —; Elaine Senise Barbosa (2011). Liberdade versus igualdade, vol. 1: o mundo em desordem: 1914–1945. São Paulo: Record. p. 457. ISBN 9788501092243.
